= Claire Smith (archaeologist) =

Australian archaeologist and academic

Claire Smith AO FSA FAHA
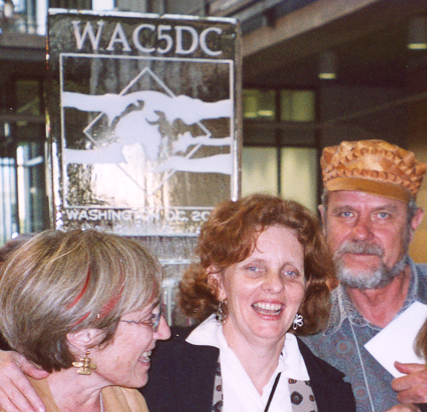
- Claire Smith (centre) with Joan Gero and H. Martin Wobst at WAC-5, Washington D.C., 2005
- Born: 15 July 1957 (age 69); Sydney, Australia
- Education: BA, University of New England, 1990; PhD, University of New England, 1996
- Occupation: Archaeologist
- Employer: Flinders University
- Organization(s): World Archaeological Congress, President from 2003 to 2008 & 2008-2014

Claire Edwina Smith AO, FSA, FAHA (born 15 July 1957) is an Australian archaeologist specialising in Indigenous archaeology, symbolic communication and rock art. She was dean (research) of the College of Humanities, Arts and Social Sciences at Flinders University in 2017-2018 and, before that, head of the Department of Archaeology. She was president of the World Archaeological Congress from 2003 to 2014. Among her many publications is the Encyclopedia of Global Archaeology (Springer 2014, 2020).

== Education and career ==
Smith obtained a bachelor's degree in archaeology from the University of New England in 1990, and a PhD from the same university in 1996. Her doctoral thesis was an ethnoarchaeological study of Australian Aboriginal art. She also wrote a book called, "Decolonizing Indigenous Archaeology." After that she held an Australian Research Council Postdoctoral Fellowship and a Fulbright Postdoctoral Fellowship.

With her husband, Gary Jackson, Smith has conducted long term field research in the Aboriginal community of Barunga. She has brought Aboriginal students to train in Adelaide, created archaeological field schools for Aboriginal students, and has been a major contributor to the development of Indigenous Archaeology, both in Australia and elsewhere in the world.

Her tenure at the helm of World Archaeological Congress included creation of a scholarly journal for the organization, Archaeologies, as well as outreach programs such as Archaeologists without Borders and the Global Libraries Project.

Her scholarly output has largely focused on the relationship between archaeologists and indigenous communities, both in Australia and around the world. She has also given attention to general interests for teaching archaeology, such as her Archaeology to Delight and Instruct, and practicing it, such as Digging It Up Down Under. Her archaeological field methods textbook for introductory students has gone through two editions in Australia and was published in an American edition. Her interest in bringing heritage and community archaeology issues to public attention, particularly the plight of Aboriginal peoples in Australia, has led to a series of articles in the Australian news source The Conversation on these topics.

Smith is a member of the editorial advisory board of the archaeology journal Antiquity.

== Honours and recognition ==
Smith's awards include the Lucy Mair Medal and the Marsh Award of the Royal Anthropological Institute (2018), a Commemorative Medal from the Confederated Tribes of the Umatilla Indian Reservation (2018), and the Lifetime Achievement Award of the World Archaeological Congress (2016). In 2010, she was elected fellow of the Society of Antiquaries of London and in 2019 she was elected fellow of the Australian Academy of the Humanities.

She was appointed Officer of the Order of Australia in the 2025 Australia Day Honours.

== Selected publications ==
Encyclopedia

- C. Smith (ed.) (2020). Encyclopedia of Global Archaeology. 2nd edition. New York: Springer. ISBN 978-3-030-30018-0.
- C. Smith (ed.) (2014). Encyclopedia of Global Archaeology. New York: Springer. ISBN 978-1-4419-0466-9.

Books

- K. Mizoguchi and C. Smith (2019). Global Social Archaeologies. Making a Difference in a World of Strangers. London: Routledge. ISBN 978-1-62958-307-5.
- H. Burke, M. Morrison and C. Smith (2017). The Archaeologist’s Field Handbook. Sydney: Allen & Unwin. 2nd edition. ISBN 9781743318065.
- H. Burke, C. Smith and L. Zimmerman (2008).The Archaeologist's Field Handbook. North American Edition. Walnut Creek, CA: AltaMira Press. ISBN 0-7591-0882-X.
- H. Burke, C. Smith, D. Lippert, J. Watkins and L. Zimmerman (eds) (2008). Kennewick: Perspectives on the Ancient One. Walnut Grove, CA: Left Coast Press. ISBN 978-1-59874-347-0.
- H. Burke and C. Smith (2007). Archaeology to Delight and Instruct. Active Learning in the University Classroom. Walnut Creek, CA: Left Coast Press. ISBN 978-1-59874-256-5.
- I. Domingo, H. Burke and C. Smith (2007). Manual de Campo Para Arqueologos. Barcelona: Ariel Editorial. ISBN 978-84-344-5231-2.
- C. Smith and H. Burke (2007). Digging it up Down Under: A Practical Guide to Doing Archaeology in Australia. New York: Springer. ISBN 0-387-35260-0.
- C. Smith and H.M. Wobst (2005). Indigenous Archaeologies: Decolonising Theory and Practice. London: Routledge. ISBN 0-415-30965-4.
- C. Smith (2004). Country, Kin and Culture. Survival of an Australian Aboriginal Community. Adelaide: Wakefield Press. ISBN 1-86254-575-8.
- H. Burke and C. Smith (2004). The Archaeologist's Field Handbook. Sydney: Allen & Unwin. ISBN 1-86508-862-5.
- C. Smith and G. K. Ward (2000). Indigenous Cultures in an Interconnected World. Sydney: Allen and Unwin & Vancouver: University of British Columbia. ISBN 1-86448-926-X.

Journal Articles

- C. Smith, G. Jackson, J. Ralph, N. Brown and G. Rankin (2020). An engaged archaeology field school with a remote Aboriginal community: Successes, failures, and challenges. Journal of Community Archaeology & Heritage. https://doi.org/10.1080/20518196.2020.1804112.
- I. Domingo Sanz, C. Smith, G. Jackson and Didac Roman Monroig (2020). Hidden sites, hidden images, hidden meanings: Does the location and visibility of motifs and sites correlate to restricted or open access? Journal of Archaeological Theory and Method 27(3):699-722. https://link.springer.com/article/10.1007/s10816-020-09465-8.
- C. Smith, H. Burke, J. Ralph, K. Pollard, A. Gorman, C. Wilson, S. Hemming, D. Rigney, D. Wesley, M. Morrison, D. McNaughton, I. Moffat, A. Roberts, J. Koolmatrie, J. Willika, B. Pamkal and G. Jackson (2019). Pursuing social justice through collaborative archaeologies in Aboriginal Australia. Archaeologies 15(3):536-569.
- C. Smith (2017). The social and political sculpting of archaeology (and Vice Versa). El modelado social y político de la Arqueología (y viceversa). Pyrenae: Revista de Prehistoria i Antiguitat de la Mediterrania Occidental 48(1):7-44. http://www.publicacions.ub.edu/doi/documents/3389.pdf.
- C. Smith, H. Burke, C. de Leiuen and G. Jackson (2016). The Islamic State’s symbolic war: Da'esh's socially mediated terrorism as a threat to cultural heritage. Journal of Social Archaeology 16(2): 164-188.
- C. Smith (2015). Global divides and cultural diversity: Challenges for the World Archaeological Congress. Archaeologies 11(1):4-41.
- C. Smith and G. Jackson (2006) Decolonizing indigenous archaeology: Developments from down under. American Indian Quarterly 30(3/4):311-349.
- C. Smith (2005). Decolonising the museum: the National Museum of the American Indian in Washington, DC. Antiquity 79(304): 424-439.
- A. Rosenfeld and C. Smith (1997). Recent developments in radiocarbon and stylistic methods of dating rock art. Antiquity 72(272):405-11.
- H. Burke, C. Lovell Jones and C. Smith (1994). Beyond the looking-glass: Some thoughts on sociopolitics and reflexivity in Australian archaeology. Australian Archaeology 38(1):13-22.
- C. Smith (1992). Colonising with style: reviewing the nexus between rock art, territoriality and the colonisation and occupation of Sahul. Australian Archaeology 31(1):34-42.

Book Chapters

- G. Nicholas and C. Smith (2020). Considering the denigration and destruction of Indigenous heritage as violence. In V. Apaydin (ed.) Critical Perspectives on Cultural Memory and Heritage: Construction, Transformation and Destruction, pp.131-154. London: University College London.
- C. Smith and J. Ralph (2019). Notre Dame: How a rebuilt cathedral could be just as wonderful. In J. Watson (ed.) The Conversation Yearbook 2019: 50 Standout Articles from Australia's Top Thinkers, pp. 15-18. Melbourne: Melbourne University Press.
- C. Smith, J. Ralph, K. Lower, J. McKinnon, M. Ebbs and V. Copley senior (2019). A new framework for interpreting contact rock art reassessing the rock art at Nackara springs: Reassessing the rock art at Nackara Springs, South Australia. In B. David & I. J. McNiven (eds.) The Oxford Handbook of the Archaeology and Anthropology of Rock Art, pp. 587-610. Oxford: Oxford University Press.
- C. Smith and H. Burke (2007). The skin game: Teaching to redress stereotypes of Indigenous people. In C. Smith and H. Burke (eds) Archaeology to Delight and Instruct : Active Learning in the University Classroom, pp. 80-101. Walnut Creek: Left Coast Press.
- C. Smith and H.M. Wobst (2005). Decolonizing archaeological theory and practice. In C. Smith and H.M. Wobst (eds) Indigenous Archaeologies: Decolonising Theory and Practice, pp. 29-39. London: Routledge.
- C. Smith and H. M. Wobst (2005). The next step: Archaeology for social justice. In C. Smith and H.M. Wobst eEds) Indigenous Archaeologies: Decolonising Theory and Practice, pp. 392-394. London: Routledge.

Online Public Articles

- C. Smith, A. Kearney, A. Kotaba, C. Wilson, J. Grant, K. Pollard and U. Saikia (2020). Friday Essay - Voices from the bush: how lockdown affects remote Indigenous communities differently. The Conversation, 15 May 2020.
- C. Smith (2019). What the termite mound ‘snowmen’ of the NT can tell us about human nature. The Conversation, 19 November 2019.
- C. Smith, G. Jackson and J. Ralph (2019). Budj Bim’s world heritage listing is an Australian first – what other Indigenous cultural sites could be next? The Conversation, 18 July 2019.
- C. Smith and J. Ralph (2019). Notre Dame: how a rebuilt cathedral could be just as wonderful. The Conversation, 16 April 2019.
- C. Smith, G. Jackson, G. Gray, and V. Copley (2018). Who Owns a Family's Story: Why it's Time to Lift the Berndt Field Notes Embargo. The Conversation, 14 September 2018.
- C. Smith, G. Jackson and J. Ralph (2018). A grave omission: the quest to identify the dead in remote NT. The Conversation, 2 August 2018.
- C. Smith (2008). Income management in the NT: Food for taxis. ABC News Opinion, 6 October 2008.

== See also ==
- Heather Burke
