= Archaeological ethics =

Branch of archaeological philosophy

Archaeological ethics refers to the moral issues raised through the study of the material past. It is a branch of the philosophy of archaeology. This article will touch on human remains, the preservation and laws protecting remains and cultural items, issues around the globe, as well as preservation and ethnoarchaeology.

Archaeologists are bound to conduct their investigations to a high standard and observe intellectual property laws, health and safety regulations, and other legal obligations. Archaeologists in the field are required to work towards the preservation and management of archaeological resources, treat human remains with dignity and respect, and encourage outreach activities. Sanctions are in place for those professionals who do not observe these ethical codes. Questions regarding archaeological ethics first began to arise during the 1960s and 1970s in North America and Western Europe. A UNESCO ratification to protect world culture in 1970 was one of the earliest actions to implement ethical standards. Archaeologists conducting ethnoarchaeological research, which involves the study of living people, are required to follow guidelines set by the Nuremberg Code (1947) and the Declaration of Helsinki (1964).

== History of ethics in archaeology ==
The earliest archaeologists were typically amateurs who would excavate a site with the sole purpose of collecting as many objects as they could for display in museums. Curiosity about past humans and the potential for finding lucrative and fascinating objects justified what many professional archaeologists today would consider to be unethical archaeological behavior. A shift toward scientific knowledge prompted many early archaeologists to begin documenting their finds. In 1906, the Antiquities Act created as the first act in America to help regulate archaeological discovery. This act allowed for federal protection of sites from looting but failed to protect native peoples from having their land and ancestral objects seized. The Society for American Archaeology was developed in 1934. This organization helped to bring regulation into the field of archaeology and provided consistent training for professional archaeologists. A series of laws passed in the 1960s and 1970s created the field of cultural resource management which protects archaeological sites from encroaching development. Debates about the rights of native peoples to their ancestral belongings occurred throughout the 1980s culminating in the passing of the Native American Graves Protection and Repatriation Act. The rise of ethics in archaeology was spurred by a shift in archaeological theory towards post-processualism which focuses on critical evaluation of methods and the implications of archaeology on politics.

== Human remains ==
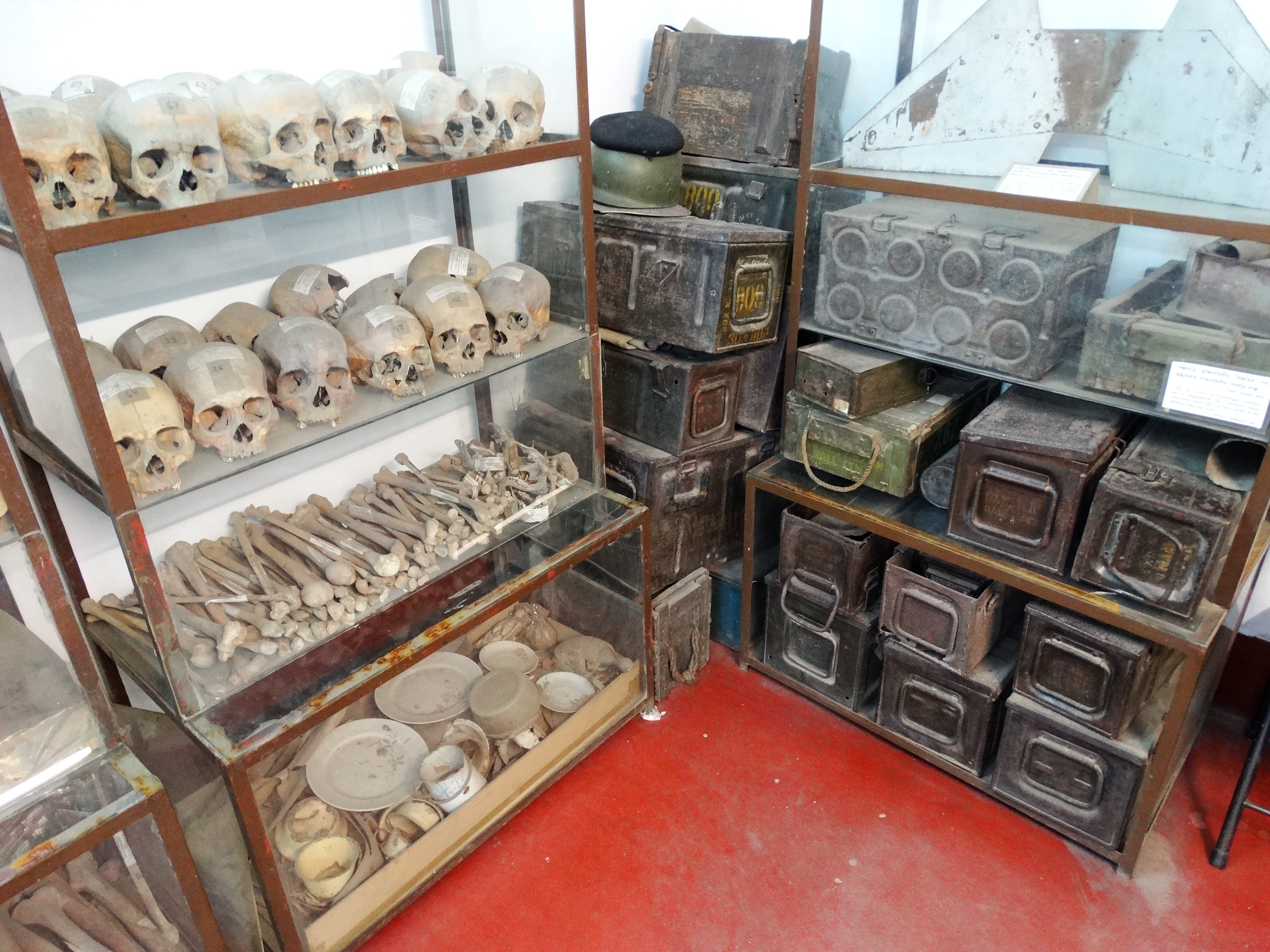
Human remains from the 1971 Bangladesh genocide on display at The Liberation War Museum in Dhaka, Bangladesh.

A common ethical issue in modern archaeology has been the treatment of human remains found during excavations, especially those that represent the ancestors of aboriginal groups in the New World or the remains of other minority races elsewhere. In November 1990 the Native American Graves Protection and Repatriation Act (NAGPRA) was enacted, facilitating the return of certain human remains and sacred objects to lineal descendants and Native American Tribes. Where previously sites of great significance to indigenous peoples could be excavated and burials and artifacts taken to be stored in museums or sold, there is now increasing awareness of taking a more respectful approach. Technical developments in ancient DNA testing have raised more ethical questions in relation to the treatment of these human remains. The issue is not limited to indigenous human remains. Nineteenth and twentieth century burial sites investigated by archaeologists, such as First World War graves disturbed by developments, have seen the remains of people with closely connected living relatives being exhumed and taken away.

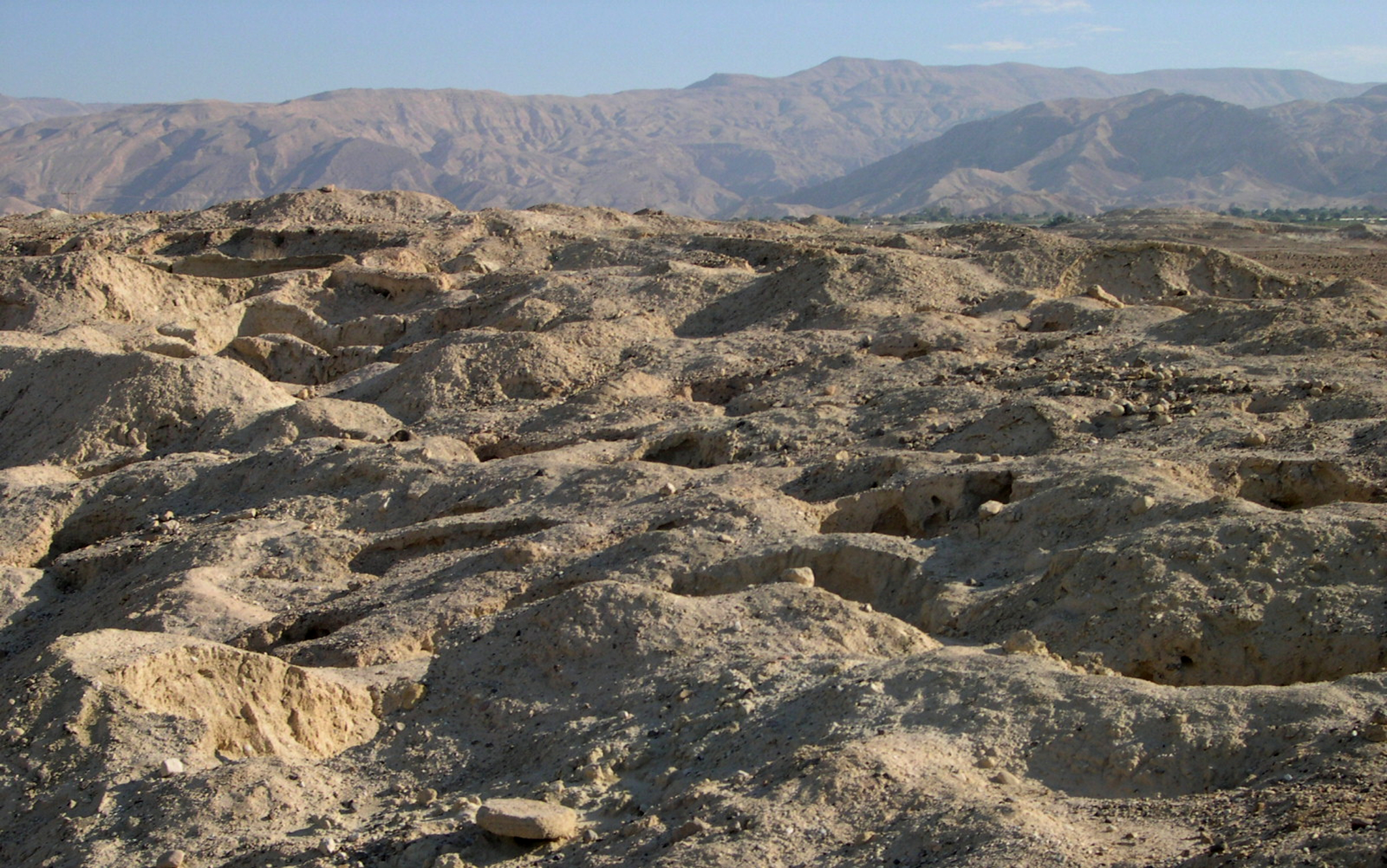
Early Bronze Age IA shaft tombs disturbed by looters, Bab edh-Dhra cemetery.

== Ethics in commercial archaeology ==
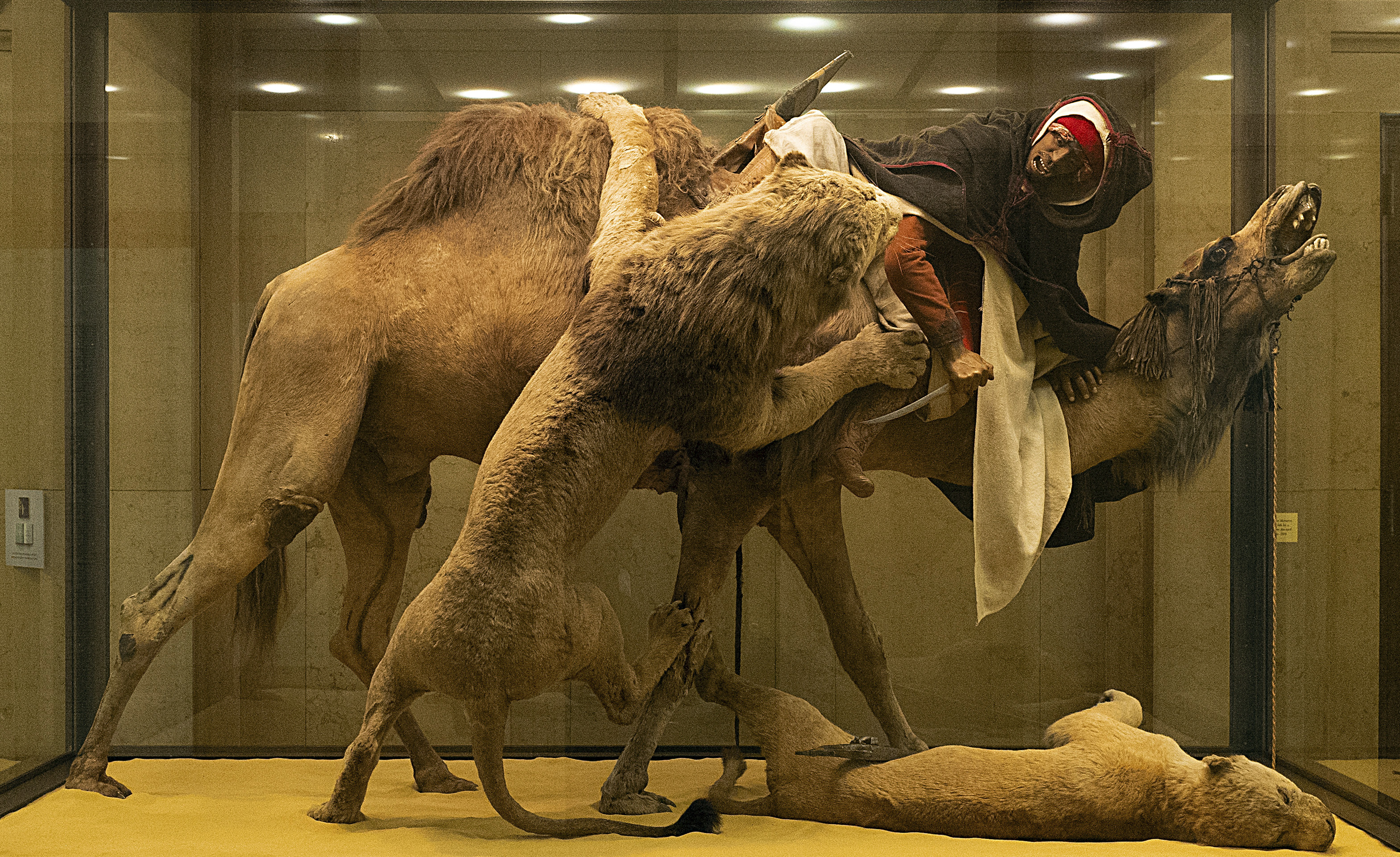
Lion Attacking a Dromedary Diorama, was found to contain unidentified human remains in 2017. This has brought up concerns of whether it is ethical to display these remains. Carnegie Museum of Natural History, Pittsburgh, PA.

In the United States, the bulk of modern archaeological work is done under the auspices of development by cultural resource management archaeologists in compliance with Section 106 of the National Historic Preservation Act. Guidance for compliance with Section 106 is provided by The Advisory Council on Historic Preservation.

=== Impacts of nondisclosure agreements ===
Much of this work is subject to non-disclosure agreements with private entities. A primary ethical criticism levied against commercial archaeological practices is the prevalence of non-disclosure agreements associated with development projects involving a cultural resource management component. Critics claim that NDA's are a barrier to public access to the archaeological record and create an unethical working condition for archaeologists to practice and that archaeology applied to the industry of development is itself a threat to the archaeological record. This practice prohibits information gathered from the archaeological record during such projects from being disseminated to the public or academic institutions for further study and peer review. Scarre writes that "collecting items that are surplus to requirements…is academically pointless and morally irresponsible" and it has been interpreted that data collected as a result of cultural resource management fieldwork unavailable to the public through NDA access restrictions creates such a surplus and therefore is ethically problematic.

=== Private property and development ===
The issue of ownership is paramount in the ethical discussion regarding commercial archaeology. In most circumstances, with the exception of human remains and artifacts associated with burials, ownership of artifacts and other material recovered from archaeological investigations performed within the scope of development projects falls to the owner of the property on which the excavation is performed. Many archaeologists consider this to be ethically problematic and a significant barrier to public access.

== Colonization and conflict ==
The World Archaeological Congress has determined that "It is unethical for Professional Archaeologists and academic institutions to conduct professional archaeological work and excavations in occupied areas possessed by force". This resolution has been interpreted to include not only regions where there is active military conflict but regions who have been in conflict in the past and are currently under colonial rule, for example, North and South America.

== Antiquities trade ==
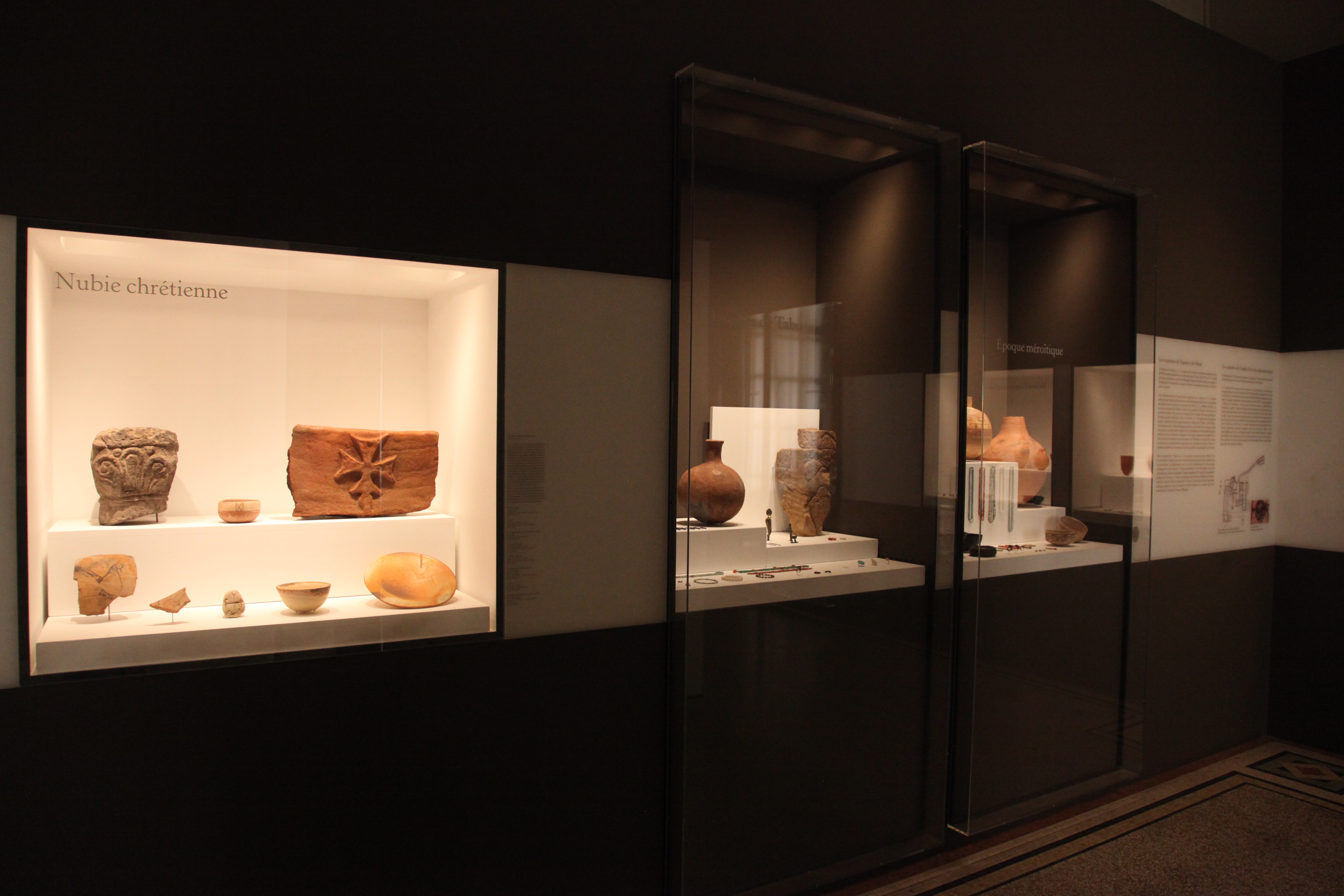
Display case of Nubian antiquities in the Musée d'Art et d'Histoire of Geneva.

Although not formally connected with the modern discipline of archaeology, the international trade in antiquities has also raised ethical questions regarding the ownership of archaeological artifacts. The market for imported antiquities has encouraged damage to archaeological sites and often led to appeals for the recall. Famous sites such as Angkor Wat in Cambodia have experienced problems with looting. Looting often leads to loss of information as material remains are removed from their original contexts. Examples of archaeological material which has been removed from its place of origin and over which there is now controversy regarding its return include the Elgin Marbles.

In the United States, the Antiquities Act protects archaeological material from looting. The act establishes punishments for archaeological looting on federal land, allows the US president to declare archaeological sites as national monuments, establishes the government's duty to preserve archaeological sites and make them available for the public, and requires that Archaeology|archaeologists conducting research must meet the guidelines set by the Secretary of the Interior.

== Laws and protections around the world ==
=== Globally ===
The World Archaeological Congress (WAC) is a global organization that holds a congress every four years to discuss recent publications and research as well as to update archaeological practice guidelines and policies. The WAC publishes a code of ethics for their archaeologists to follow. Some of the accords which have been adopted by the WAC code of ethics include the Dead Sea Accord, the Vermillion Accord on Human Remains, and the Tamaki Makau-rau Accord on the Display of Human Remains and Sacred Objects. The WAC has also published a separate code of ethics for the protection of the Amazon Forest Peoples. In 1970, the United Nations Educational, Scientific, and Cultural Organization, UNESCO, held a convention in Paris on the Means of Prohibiting and Preventing the Illicit Import, Export and Transfer of Ownership of Cultural Property. Many countries joined and it was put into use in 1972. Archaeological ethics are not the same around the world and what is considered ethical behavior can vary from culture to culture. Many archaeological organizations around the world require their members to follow a code of ethics; several of these associations, however, do not publish their code of ethics for non-members. Some of these associations include the Korean Archaeological Society and the Japanese Archaeological Association.

The Register of Professional Archaeologists is a multinational organization that provides accreditation for archaeologists and adjacent professionals. They provide a network which serves to connect archaeologists to each other and to industries which rely upon their expertise.

=== America ===
The Society for American Archaeology (SAA) is an organization which is dedicated the ethical practice of archaeology and the preservation of archaeological materials in America. The SAA's committee on archaeological ethics continually updates the living document titled Principles of Archaeological Ethics, which was first created in 1996. The SAA registers professional archaeologists who must agree to uphold the code of conduct while conducting research.

The United States government continually passes legislation to protect archaeological materials and uphold ethical archaeological research. The Antiquities Act of 1906 established punishment for archaeological looting, ensured the governments' responsibility to preserve archaeological sites, and created guidelines for conducting archaeological research. The Historic Sites Act of 1935 further confirmed that the preservation of archaeological sites is of national concern. The National Historic Preservation Act of 1966 provided federal protection of archaeological sites and established the need for environmental review, ensuring that development does not destroy archaeological material. The Archaeological Resource Protection Act of 1979 states that archaeological materials must be preserved once they are discovered. The Native American Graves Repatriation Act of 1990 (NAGPRA) constitutes that museums receiving government funding must attempt to return archaeological materials to Native Americans if the natives claim the material. NAGPRA also states that native organizations must be consulted when Native American materials are found or are expected to be found.

=== Europe ===
The European Association of Archaeologists (EAA), like the Society for American Archaeology in the United States, is an organization which regulates the ethical practice of archaeology across Europe. The EAA requires its members to follow a published code of ethics. The code of ethics requires archaeologists to inform the public of their work, preserve archaeological sites, and evaluate the social and ecological impacts of their work before beginning. This code further provides an ethical framework for conducting contractual archaeology, fieldwork training, and journal publications.

While the EAA regulates ethical archaeological practices across Europe, the British Association for Biological Anthropology and Osteoarchaeology further provides an ethical guideline for British archaeologists who are conducting research with human remains.

=== Australia ===
The Australian Archaeological Association (AAA) is an organization which regulates and promotes archaeology across Australia. The AAA has a published code of ethics which its members must follow. The AAA code of ethics highlights issues such as gaining informed consent, rights of indigenous people, and conservation of heritage sites. The AAA code of ethics also states that any member who fails to adhere to the code is subject to disciplinary action.

=== Canada ===
The Canadian Archaeological Association (CAA) exists to promote archaeological knowledge, promote general interest in archaeology, and to act as a liaison between Canadian Aboriginals and archaeologists studying their ancestors. The CAA assures ethical archaeological practices among their members by offering a principles of ethics guideline. These principles of ethics focuses on assuring access to knowledge, conserving archaeological sites whenever possible, and promoting ethical relationships between Aboriginals and archaeologists.

== National and international controversies ==
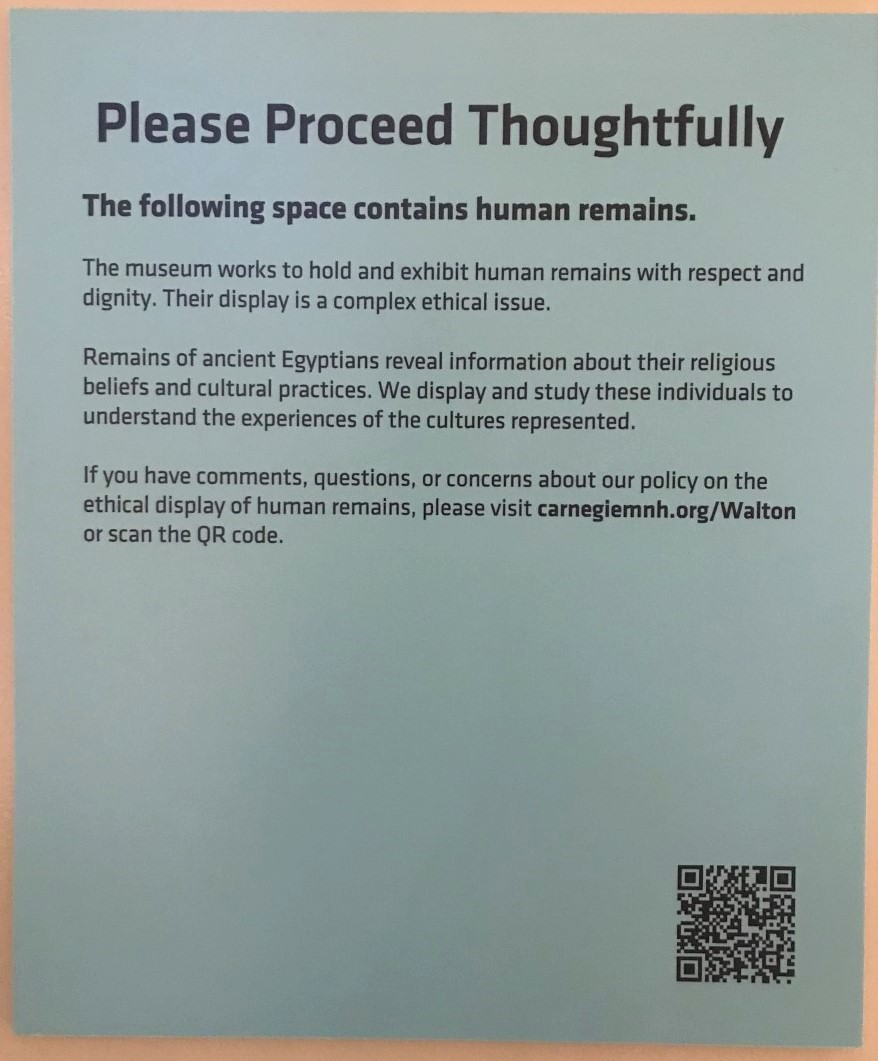
Sign displayed before entering an area of the Walton Hall of Ancient Egypt at the Carnegie Museum of Natural History. The museum invites questions and input regarding ethical displays of human remains. A QR code is featured to access more information.

Many archaeologists in the West today are employees of national governments or are privately employed instruments of government-derived archaeology legislation. In all cases this legislation is a compromise to some degree or another between the interests of the archaeological remains and the interests of economic development.

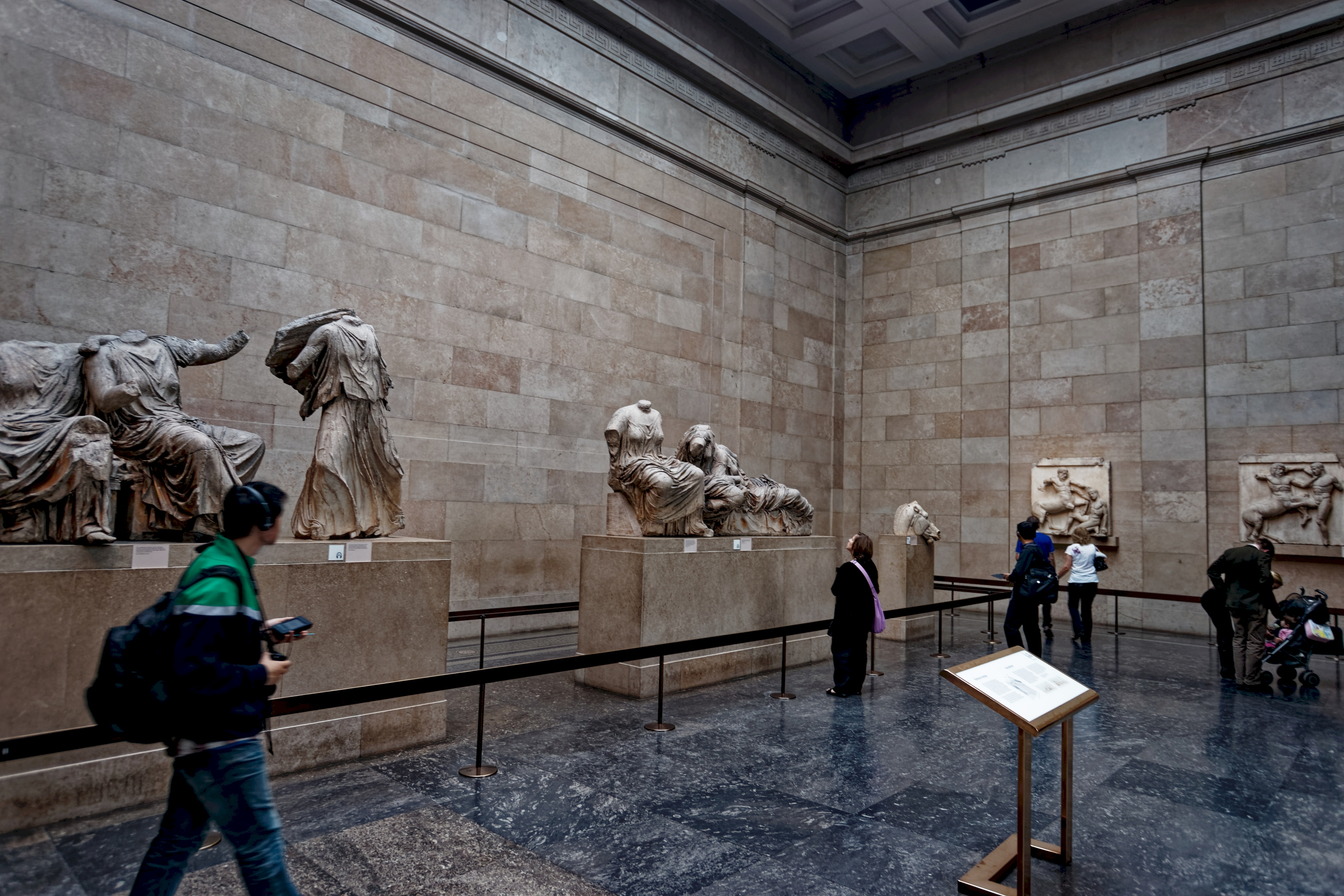
The British Museum's possession of the Parthenon Sculptures, also called the "Elgin Marbles", has been ethically questioned because these sculptures were removed from Greece under contested circumstances.

=== Germany ===
A question of control and ownership over the past has also been raised through the political manipulation of the archaeological record to promote nationalism and justify military invasion. A famous example is the corps of archaeologists employed by Adolf Hitler to excavate in central Europe in the hope of finding evidence for a region-wide Aryan culture.

=== United Kingdom ===
Questions regarding the ethical validity of government heritage policies and whether they sufficiently protect important remains are raised during cases such as High Speed 1 in London where burials at a cemetery at St Pancras railway station were hurriedly dug using a JCB and mistreated in order to keep an important infrastructure project on schedule.

=== Greece ===
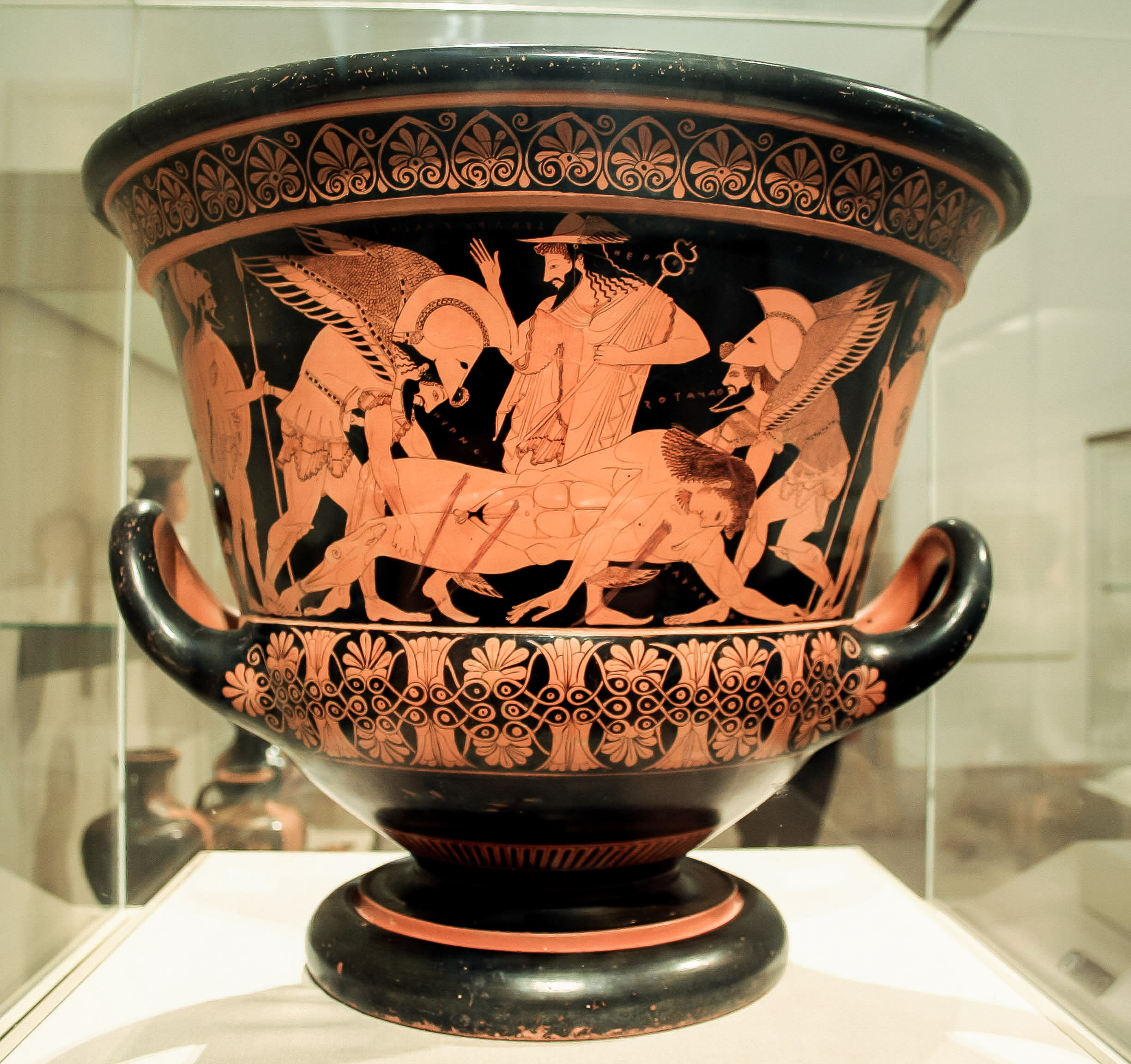
The Euphronios Krater was returned to Italy in 2008. It was purchased by the Metropolitan Museum of Art in 1972, who later found out it had been illegally obtained.

The Parthenon marbles, also known as the Elgin Marbles, include a series of stone sculptures and friezes that were from the Parthenon in Athens, Greece. Greece was under Ottoman rule at the time when Thomas Bruce, 7th Lord of Elgin, or Lord Elgin, as British Ambassador to the Ottoman Empire asked that he be able to take some of the marbles to a safer place and was granted that in 1801. They were sold in 1816 to the British Museum, and Parliament paid £350,000 for the marbles. Greece has been petitioning to have the marbles returned since 1924, claiming that they were illegally obtained since they were occupied by a foreign force and were not acting in line with the people of Greece.

=== Italy ===
In 1972, the Metropolitan Museum of Art in New York City purchased the Euphronious Krater, a vase used for mixing wine and water from a collector named Robert Hecht for $1,000,000. Hecht provided documentation which after Italian investigations proved to be falsified. This falsification was later confirmed in 2001 when authorities found a handwritten memoir of Hecht's. The Krater had been obtained in an illegal excavation in 1971, likely from an Etruscan tomb. It was purchased from the Giacomo Medici then smuggled into Switzerland and sold to the museum in New York. In 2006, the museum's director, Philipe de Montebello, agreed to return the Krater along with several other items to Italy. They arrived back in Italy in 2008, and are on display at the Villa Giulia in Rome.

== Preservation ==
Another issue is the question of whether unthreatened archaeological remains should be excavated (and therefore destroyed) or preserved intact for future generations to investigate with potentially less invasive technology. Some archaeological guidance such as PPG 16 has established a strong ethical argument for only excavating sites threatened with destruction. New technology such as laser scanning has pioneered non-invasive techniques for recording petroglyphs and engravings. Other technology like GPS and Google Earth has revolutionized the way archaeologists find and record potential archaeological sites.

In the United States, several acts have been passed to help preserve archaeological sites. Some of these acts include the National Historic Preservation act of 1966, which allows for archaeological sites and materials of historical significance to be placed under federal protection, and the Archaeological Resources Protection Act (ARPA) of 1979, which places all archaeological sites under federal protection, not just sites of historical significance.

Cultural resource management is a branch of archaeology which attempts to protect archaeological sites from development and construction damage.

== Ethics in ethnoarchaeology ==
Ethnoarchaeology is the ethnographic study of people from an archaeological point of view. These studies are typically conducted on material remains from the society in question, is sometimes used in conjunction with traditional archaeology. Ethnoarchaeology presents a unique case, because it deals with the study of people, which is heavily regulated. Any research dealing with humans must be submitted to an ethics committee for approval under the Nuremberg Code (1947) and the Declaration of Helsinki (1964). Researchers must also obtain informed consent from their research subjects.

Archaeologists conducting ethnoarchaeology or other types of research involving humans must adhere to a certain code in order to conduct legal and ethical research, however, this code is the same that is followed by medical research. There is no specific code for archaeological research involving humans. This has been problematic and some archaeologists resist following a medical ethics code by claiming that medical research and ethnographic research are too different to follow the same code.
