= Moogy Sumner =

Aboriginal Australian elder (born 1948)

Moogy Summner AM
- Sumner in 2026

Member of the South Australian First Nations Voice for Central
- Incumbent
- Assumed office 16 March 2024
- Preceded by: Position established

Personal details
- Born: Major Lancelot Sumner; 1948 (age 77–78) Point McLeay, South Australia, Australia
- Party: Greens (2018–present)
- Spouse: Loretta Sumner
- Children: 9
- Occupation: Dancer; cultural ambassador; environmental activist

Major Lancelot "Moogy" Sumner (born 1948) is an Aboriginal Australian elder, dancer and community advocate of Ngarrindjeri and Kaurna descent. His work include cultural education, repatriation of Aboriginal ancestral remains, environmental activism and community well-being.

Sumner was born at Point McLeay, presently known as Raukkan, South Australia, and went to school in Point McLeay before moving to Millicent, where he studied at Millicent High School. After the divorce of his parents, he and some of his brothers lived at a boys' home in Semaphore. He engaged himself in various occupations when he was young, including working in the railroads in the Nullarbor Plain.

In the 1980s, Sumner got involved with the Aboriginal Sobriety Group, which helped him overcome his dependence on alcohol. Later, he founded the Tal-Kin-Jeri Dance Group, which presented Aboriginal dance, music, storytelling, and culture in Australia and abroad. He co-founded the Sober Walk project in 2009. In the following year, he took part in the revival of river ceremonies in Ringbalin Murrundi River Spirit. For decades, he has also been campaigning for the repatriation of Aboriginal remains.

Sumner has contested various federal elections for the Australian Greens in the Mayo by-election in 2018, the Australian Senate elections in 2019 and 2022, and Barker in 2025. In 2024, Sumner became the elected representative to the Central Local First Nations Voice in South Australia. The position was successfully defended in 2026. His areas of concern include Aboriginal representation, preservation of the Murray-Darling river system, and the rejection of oil and gas exploration in the Great Australian Bight.

Sumner has been made a Member of the Order of Australia in the 2014 Australia Day Honours in recognition of his service to the indigenous community of South Australia through health and welfare, youth, and cultural heritage organisations. His other honours include the first-ever Stevie Gadlabarti Goldsmith Memorial Award in 2018, the South Australian Premier's NAIDOC Award in 2021, a South Australian Environment Awards Lifetime Achiever Award in 2022, and the Bettison and James Award in 2023.

== Early life and education ==
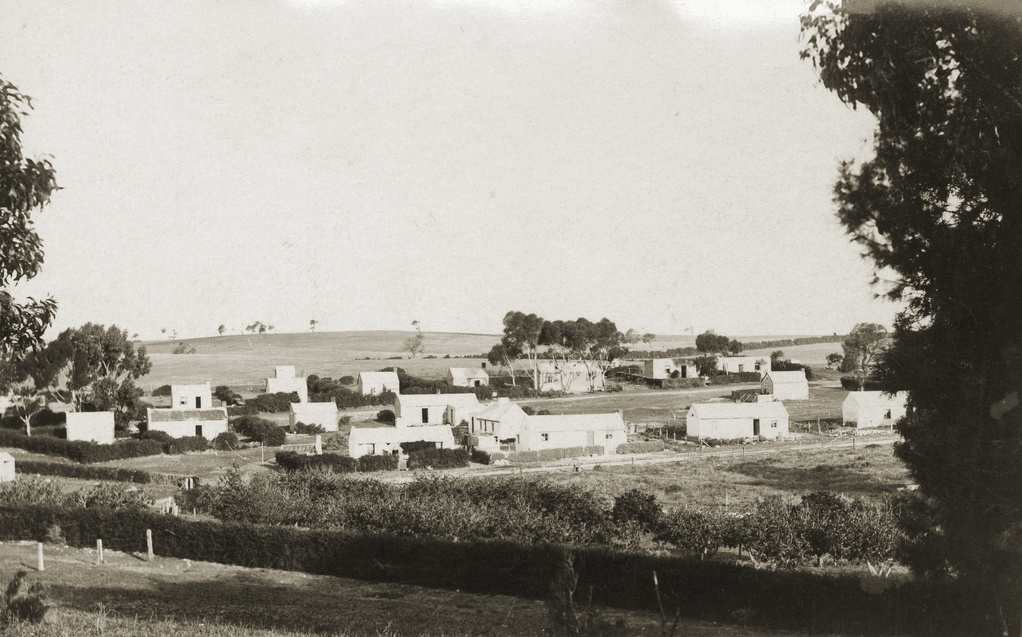
Point McLeay Mission in 1926

Major Lancelot "Moogy" Sumner was born in 1948 at Point McLeay, now Raukkan, which is an Aboriginal mission at the banks of Lake Alexandrina in South Australia. Sumner is of Ngarrindjeri and Kaurna heritage, with his Kaurna heritage traced back to his mother. The eleventh of twelve children, he grew up alongside his family members at Raukkan and went to Raukkan Primary School.

According to Sumner, he did not know as a kid about the regulations imposed on Aboriginal people outside his community, though he remembered that dancing was not allowed at the mission. His father, Colin Rex Sumner, was born at Long Point in the Coorong, which has been the home of earlier generations of the family. Sumner said he had accompanied his father on horse-drawn cart rides, while his mother made the rabbits into stew or roast dishes.

At eleven years old, Sumner's family required a pass in order to travel via the bus to Adelaide from Raukkan to get clothes and blankets, and their movement in the city was limited. He later grew up in Millicent after moving there as part of government policies of assimilation. He mentioned that being separated from his large family was hard for him, and he had experienced discrimination from other kids, their parents, and the whole community. He went to Millicent High School.

As recounted by his sister Polly Sumner, after the separation of his parents, his mother left Millicent in the care of the children, with the assistance of two uncles. The family stayed for some time at a farm at Narrung before making their way to Adelaide in early 1962. The family first stayed at the North Adelaide Women's Home in Sussex Street until his mother got work there. Sumner and several of his brothers were placed in a boys' home in Semaphore.

Sumner's father died when he was 19 years old, in the far north of South Australia in 1967. Sumner mentioned that his father was murdered in a bar fight, but no one ever got charged for his murder. His father's body was taken to Adelaide for autopsy, and since the family could not afford to have his father's body buried, he ended up being buried in a pauper's grave at West Terrace Cemetery.

== Cultural and community work ==
In his youth, Sumner was involved in many professions, even working on the railways in the Nullarbor Plain. In the 1980s, he became associated with the Aboriginal Sobriety Group, which he later referred to as instrumental in overcoming his dependency on alcohol. He then got employed in Aboriginal health, social work, youth work, and cultural education. Sumner and his family traveled to Canada to study how Indigenous law and justice were incorporated in the legal system.

In the 1990s, Sumner founded the Tal-Kin-Jeri Dance Group, which showcased Aboriginal dance, music, storytelling, art, and language through shows and educational programs. As a dancer and cultural educator, he taught cultural awareness in schools and communities, and also showed the Ngarrindjeri culture worldwide. He was also involved in singing, wood carving, and the demonstration of traditional weapons such as shields, clubs, boomerangs, and spears.

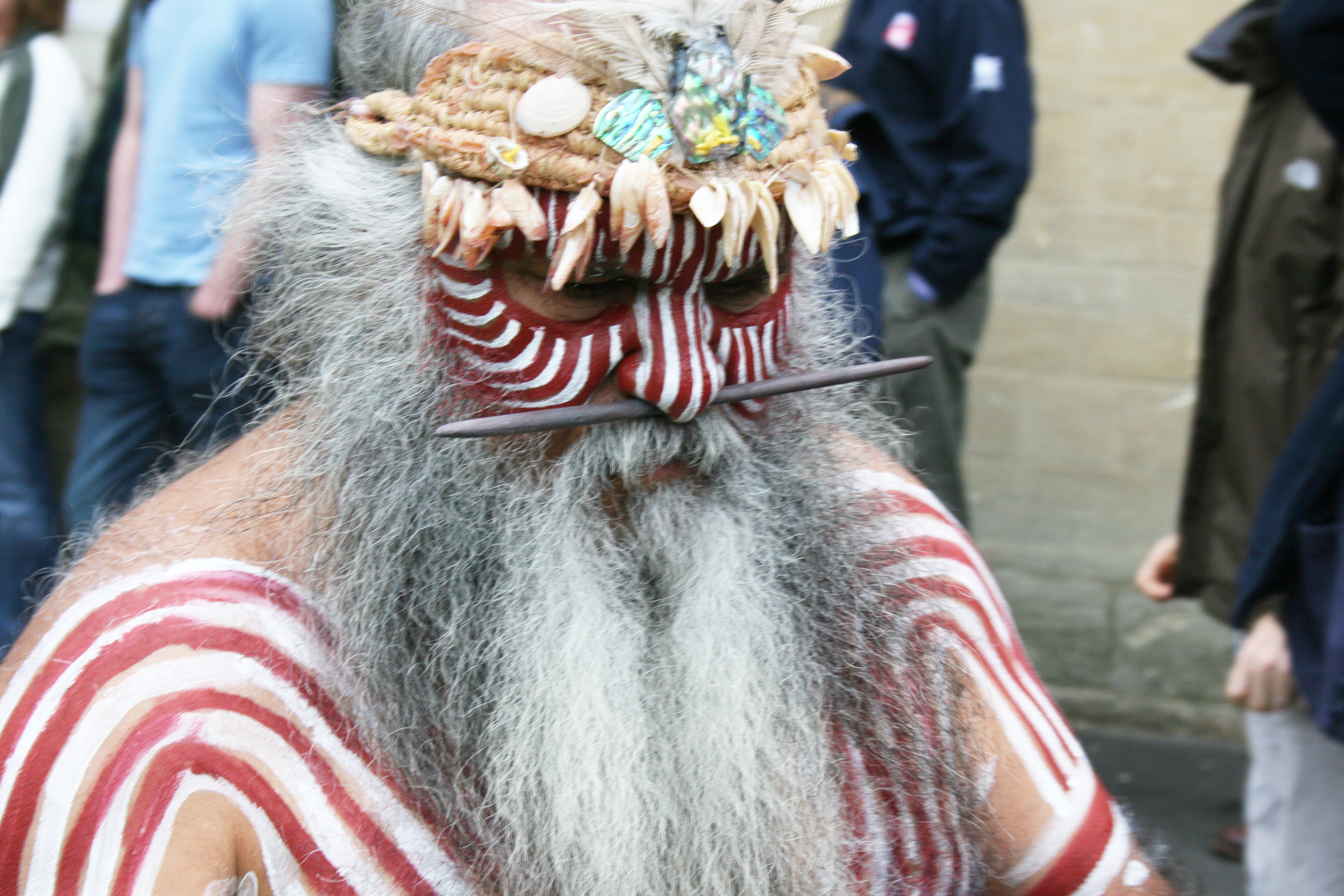
Sumner conducting a smoking ceremony during the repatriation of Aboriginal ancestral remains, 2009

Sumner helped start Sober Walk in 2009. In the following year, he helped revive the river ceremony through Ringbalin Murrundi River Spirit, alongside other dancers of Aboriginal origin, travelling down the Darling and Murray Rivers from Queensland to the Coorong and Murray Mouth. The ceremony was held in order to deal with a drought that lasted long, holding ceremonies every night, and turned out to be an annual celebration. The journey of 2010 was captured on film in Ringbalin: Breaking the Drought in 2014. Sumner was also a part of the original soundtrack.

Moogy's Yuki at the South Australian Maritime Museum, 17 June 2026

The construction of the Moogy's Yuki took place in 2011 and is called "the first Ngarrindjeri bark canoe on Country in South Australia in more than 100 years." The participants of the dance troupe and Aboriginal children learned how to make a canoe during the project in Kalangadoo and Millicent. Afterwards, the canoe toured around regional South Australia in the Country Arts show. In 2011, Sumner became a member of the South Australian Aboriginal Advisory Council.

By July 2018, Sumner was an artistic director of the Tal-Kin-Jeri Dance Group, and he sat on the boards of the Ngarrindjeri Regional Authority and Black Dance Australia.

Sumner has taken part in the repatriation of the bodies of Aboriginal ancestors from Australian institutions as well as from other countries such as Britain and Germany. By December 2021, he had been doing this job for around forty years. On 7 December 2021, he participated in a smoking ceremony and burial of 130 Kaurna ancestors at Wangayarta, a cemetery site located in Smithfield Memorial Park, in collaboration with Kaurna elders Jeffrey Newchurch and Madge Wanganeen.

When Wangayarta was under construction, Sumner spread soil from Kaurna Country all over the burial site so that the ancestors could be reburied in soil from their Country. The eastern burial mound at Wangayarta was used for the third reburial at Wangayarta, which took place on 12 December 2023. In November 2024, he went to California to bring back an Ngarrindjeri ancestor as part of a larger repatriation effort, which involved fourteen First Nations ancestors from four institutions.

Some of the other positions held by Sumner include being a member of the World Archaeological Congress, World Council of Elders and International Indigenous Repatriation Committee, patron of the Wayapa Wurrk Aboriginal Wellness Foundation, and director of Talkingjeri Aboriginal Corporation. He has also been a member of the South Australian Film Corporation's First Nations Advisory Committee.

== Political career and advocacy ==
Sumner has campaigned for the conservation of land and water, including the Murray-Darling river system, and against the drilling of oil and gas in the Great Australian Bight. His other areas of interest have been renewable energy, youth education and the participation of Aboriginal communities in policy decision making.

Sumner became the Australian Greens' candidate in the Mayo by-election in May 2018. He stated that the environmental policies of the party were based on the Ngarrindjeri duty to protect Country and that he wanted more Aboriginal people to participate in decisions made regarding their land. He obtained 7,898 first preference votes, which constituted 8.90% of the formal vote total and finished third out of seven candidates. The incumbent Centre Alliance member Rebekha Sharkie held onto her seat.

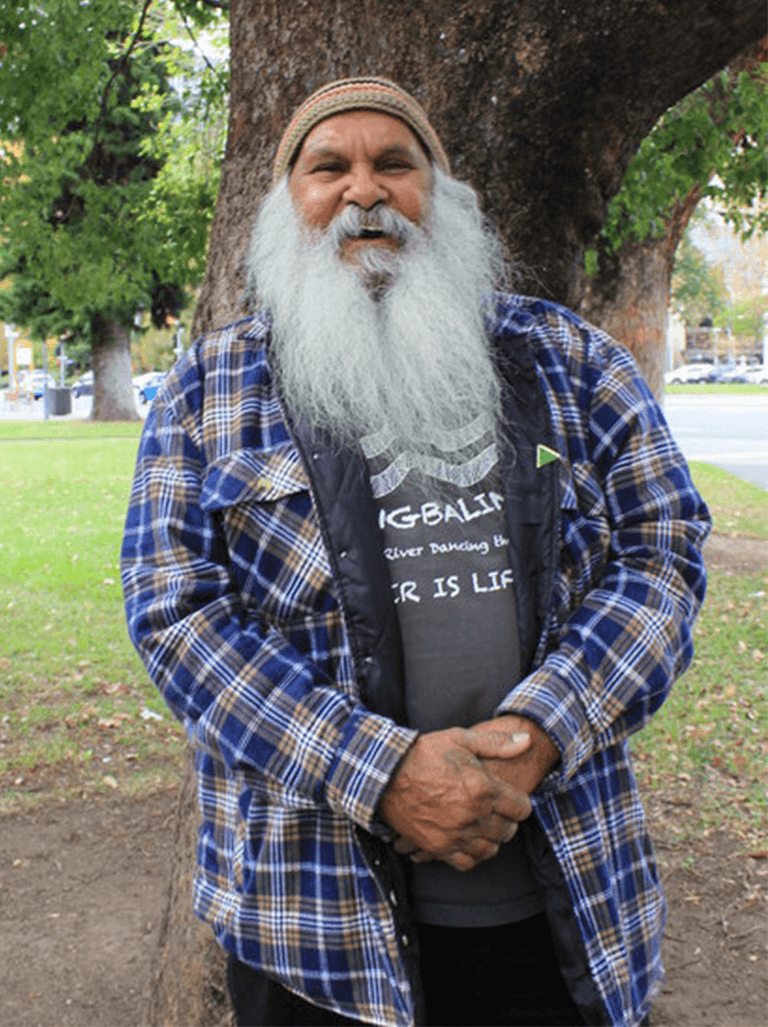
Sumner in a political campaign portrait, c. 2019

In the 2019 federal election, Sumner ran second on the list of the Greens for the Senator for South Australia, behind Sarah Hanson-Young. While Hanson-Young was elected, Sumner was not successful. Again, in 2022 federal election, Sumner ran second in the Senate list of the Greens for South Australia, behind Barbara Pocock, advocating for the protection of the Murray River, inequality, and Aboriginal representation.

Sumner held a smoking ceremony at Tandanya National Aboriginal Cultural Institute in February 2023, prior to the launch of the Yes campaign for the Indigenous Voice to Parliament. In March 2023, he participated in the celebration of the passage of the legislation for South Australia's First Nations Voice, which was held outside Parliament House in Adelaide.

On 14 August 2023, Sumner spoke at the Climate Action I Assembly at the Parliament of the World's Religions in Chicago about responsibilities regarding earth, the significance of fresh water for people and the ecosystem, and river ceremony. On 30 August, he gave the Welcome to Country speech at a Yes campaign launch at the Playford Civic Centre, Elizabeth.

Sumner was elected to the Regional One (Central) Local First Nations Voice during the South Australian First Nations Voice election held on 16 March 2024. Sumner secured 178 votes in first preference votes which were the highest in the region and he was the first out of eleven members elected.

Sumner spoke against the plan of restructure within the South Australian Museum in April 2024, stating his apprehension over the effect of losing skilled staff members on the ancestral repatriation process and relations between the South Australian Museum and Traditional Owners. Sumner mentioned the involvement of museum staff in the creation of Wangayarta and appealed for retaining their skills.

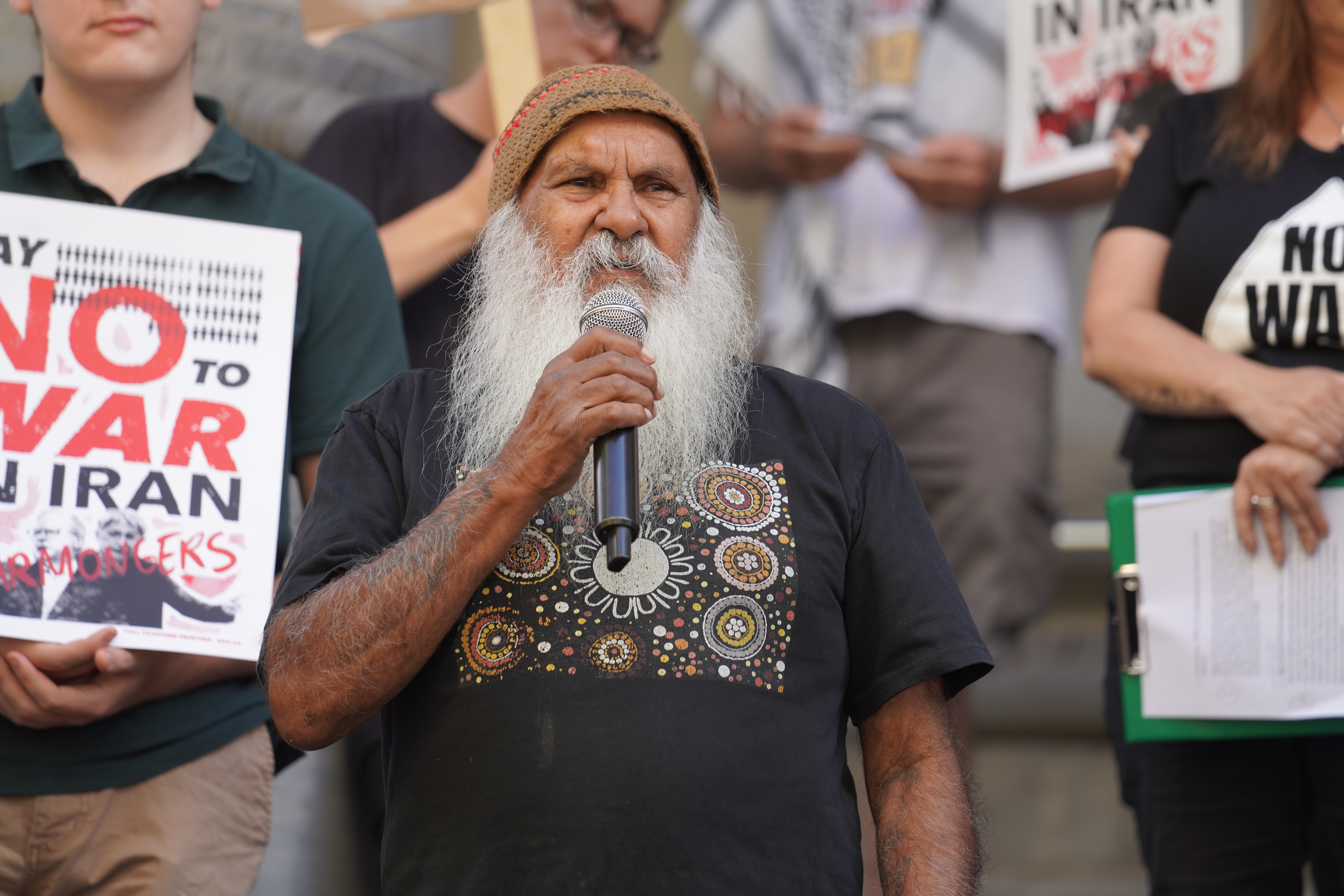
Sumner speaking at a rally opposing the Iran war on the steps of Parliament House, Adelaide, in March 2026

At the federal election of 2025, Sumner ran against Barker in the Greens for the preservation of the Murray River and Great Australian Bight, inequality, and representation of Aborigines in the parliament. He received 8,866 votes or 8.16 per cent of the formal vote, placing fourth among ten candidates. Sumner subsequently won another term in the Regional One in the 2026 First Nations Voice election. Sumner secured 550 first preference votes, which is about 33.4 per cent of the formal vote and the highest number among fourteen competitors.

== Recognition and honours ==
Sumner in traditional dress (right) at the Freedom of Entry parade for No. 24 Squadron RAAF, in Adelaide, October 2026

In 2010, Sumner won the Hero Award at the My Hero International Film Festival, in which the movie Moogy's Yuki produced by him ranked second in the community film segment.

In the 2014 Australia Day Honours, Sumner was honoured with the Member of the Order of Australia (AM) for his services to the indigenous community of South Australia through health, social welfare, youth, and cultural heritage organisations.

On 1 December 2018, he was awarded the inaugural Stevie Gadlabarti Goldsmith Memorial Award at the Ruby Awards, which took place at the Queen's Theatre in Adelaide. This award was given in honour of his contribution to arts and culture.

Sumner was nominated as Elder of the Year at the 2020 Aboriginal and Torres Strait Islander Awards of the City of Port Adelaide Enfield. In the next year, he won the South Australian Premier's NAIDOC Award in appreciation of his contributions to the Aboriginal people and culture, and his advocacy of lands and waterways.

During the South Australian Environment Awards of 2022, Sumner was given a Lifetime Achiever Award and was inducted into the South Australian Environment Hall of Fame for his efforts in environmental activism and his ability to unite culture, community, and country.

In 2023, Sumner received the 10th annual Bettison and James Award for cultural education, ancestral repatriation, and environmental advocacy. In connection with the award, he was expected to make a presentation on his life and achievements at the Adelaide Film Festival on 28 October.

== Personal life ==
Sumner is married to Loretta Sumner. In 2014, he resided in Findon, which is a suburb of Adelaide on its western side. As of 2017, Sumner had nine children, 27 grandchildren and five great-grandchildren, and as of 2018, he had 28 grandchildren.

Sumner has been connected with his relations residing in Goolwa and other coastal regions. For him, Goolwa is considered a place of spiritual significance. With his wife, Sumner owns a small lease of the land owned by Aboriginals near his birthplace at Point McLeay. Sumner would like to be buried on Ngarrindjeri Country in the Coorong alongside his father, whom he wants to be relocated from West Terrace Cemetery. According to him, Adelaide Cemeteries Authority chief executive Robert Pitt helped him locate his father's grave, and that he leases the land from the Aboriginal Lands Trust to return his father to Country.

The known siblings of Sumner are Basil, Colin, Polly and June. Additionally, he is related to Cyril and Rufus Rigney who fought in the First World War. Sumner has worked in Adelaide and in Camp Coorong.
