= Gilbert Pwiti =

- Occupation: Archaeologist

Academic background
- Education: University of Cambridge
- Thesis: Continuity and change: an archaeological study of farming communities in northern Zimbabwe AD 500-1700

Gilbert Pwiti is an archaeologist. He is a pioneer of modern archaeological and heritage management research in southern Africa and Zimbabwe. Pwiti was amongst the first generation of indigenous historians to be trained in archaeology in postcolonial southern Africa and he was the first professor of Archaeology in Zimbabwe.

== Education and early life ==
Pwiti was born in 1958 in Mazoe, Federation of Rhodesia and Nyasaland.

He received a BA Dual Hons in History and African Languages in 1980 from the University of Zimbabwe. In 1982, he moved to Europe to continue his archaeological training. He studied for an MPhil in Archaeology at Cambridge University in 1985. He received a PhD in Archaeology in 1996 from the University of Uppsala. His thesis was entitled Continuity and change: an archaeological study of farming communities in northern Zimbabwe AD 500-1700.

== Career ==
Pwiti was amongst the first generation of indigenous archaeologists in Zimbabwe. In 1985, he established the first archaeological unit in Zimbabwe, as part of the Department of History at the University of Zimbabwe. He established the first archaeological degree in Zimbabwe, first offered in 1990. Later, in 2000, he had a key fundamental role in establishing the Master of Art degree in Heritage Studies at the University of Zimbabwe. Pwiti assisted colleagues in establishing further archaeological departments in Zimbabwe, at Midlands State University and Great Zimbabwe University.

His main archaeological research has been in the regions of northern and eastern Zimbabwe, including finding evidence for early farming in the mid Zambezi valley. He undertook excavations at Kadzi, recording evidence for farming in the fifth century CE. His research has also addressed the transformation to complex societies in the 2nd millennium CE, questioning the existence of a 2nd wave of Bantu migrations.

Pwiti has undertaken major work on cultural heritage management in postcolonial Africa, including developing key concepts such as intangible heritage and community participation. Through this work he showed how colonial rule separated people from their physical and cultural heritage. More recent work with Shadreck Chirikure has addressed the challenges for heritage management in identifying custodians for heritage.

Throughout Pwiti's career he has authored and edited several key publications, including Caves, Monuments and Texts: Zimbabwean Archaeology Today (1997), and Legal Framework for the Protection of Immovable Cultural Heritage in Africa with Webber Ndoro (2005). He established the publication series Studies in the African Past in 2001 with colleagues from East Africa.

Pwiti has had a key role in mentoring heritage managers and professional archaeologists in Zimbabwe. He has also held a number of visiting academic positions at international institutions, including the Department of History of the University of Botswana. He was acting president of the World Archaeological Congress from 1998 to 2000, and served as the Secretary General of the Pan African Congress for Prehistory and Related Studies.

== Selected publications ==
Pwiti, G. 1991. Trade and economies in southern Africa: the archaeological evidence. Zambezia 18 (2), 119-129.

Pwiti, G. 1994. Prehistory, archaeology and education in Zimbabwe, in P. G. Stone & B.L. Molyneaux (ed.) The Presented Past: Heritage, Museums and Education: 338-48. London: Routledge, Taylor & Francis Group.

Pwiti, G. 1996. Continuity and Change: An Archaeological Study of Farming Communities in Northern Zimbabwe AD 500-1700. Studies in African Archaeology 13. Uppsala: Societas Archaeologica Upsaliensis.

Pwiti, G. 1996. Let the ancestors rest in peace? New challenges for cultural heritage management in Zimbabwe. Conservation and Management of Archaeological Sites 1(3), 151-160.

Pwiti, G. 1997a. Caves, Monuments and Texts: Zimbabwean Archaeology Today. Studies in African Archaeology 14. Uppsala: Department of Archaeology and Ancient History.

Pwiti, G, and Ndoro, W. 1999. The legacy of colonialism: Perceptions of the cultural heritage in Southern Africa, with special reference to Zimbabwe. The African Archaeological Review 16(3): 143-153.

Pwiti, G. 2004. Economic change, ideology and the development of cultural complexity in northern Zimbabwe. Azania 39: 265-82.
