= African diaspora archaeology =

Study of the archaeology of the African diaspora

The African diaspora is the worldwide collection of communities descended from people from Africa, including Africans that were forcibly transported throughout the world by the Atlantic slave trade, the Trans-Saharan slave trade, or the Indian Ocean slave trade and their descendants. The archaeology of these communities has worldwide scope, but the majority of research comes from Africa and the Americas, with very little from Europe and Asia.

== Terminology ==
African diaspora archaeology developed out of the studies of Africans and their descendants in research confined to specific locations. The term African diaspora was not used in archaeology until the 1990s, prior to its use, localized terminology such as Afro-Caribbean and African-American was used, and in some cases, “African diaspora” was adopted as a term intended to unify research beyond borders and oceans.

== Themes and research topics ==
=== Maritime archaeology ===
This archaeological subfield pertains to studying human interaction with the sea, not limited to sites found under water. Maritime archaeology is relevant to the study of the African Diaspora through the maritime aspect of the three slave trades of special interest in the process of enslavement, as well as in African and Diasporic spiritual associations with the sea, maritime-related labor, and the sea as an avenue to freedom.

=== Plantation slavery ===
Archaeology on plantations is a major focus in the United States and can cover various aspects of the lives and experiences of the enslaved, including but not limited to the formation of identities, the relationship between master and enslaved, religious practice, and gender.

=== Resistance ===
Many sites and research are focused around the idea of resistance; within this category are sites associated with Fugitivity, meaning the self-emancipated enslaved, also known as runaway slaves or Maroons. Also of interest are long-term Maroon settlements, also called Quilombos or Palenques.

=== Transculturation ===
Coined by Cuban polymath Fernando Ortiz, transculturation is “the multigenerational, multidirectional transition from one cultural condition to another.” transculturation has become a major theme of interest in Latin America but has not found as wide adoption in the United States or Europe.

== Brazil ==
Brazil is credited with the earliest known example of African Diaspora archaeology, conducted in the 1930s. Burials attributed to fugitive slaves were excavated in caves located in Serra Negra.

=== Palmares ===
In an example of archaeology of a maroon settlement, Pedro Funari and Charles Orser conducted archaeology at Palmares in the early 1990s with the goals of using archaeology to gain a better understanding of racism, resistance to racism, and to empower “subordinate groups." Orser and Funari have found material evidence of traits that come from European, Indigenous, and African cultures, which others have claimed as an example of ethnogenesis and the formation of a new cultural identity at Palmares. Interpretation of the archaeological assemblage at Palmares has added to the information in the historic record as well as challenged interpretations of the archaeological records that have interpreted the inhabitants of Palmares as “lazy” and "Barbarians." Funari's interpretation claims that the archaeology at Palmares shows a people capable of maintaining their cultural autonomy, yet at the same time, this maroon community was interacting with European colonists and exchanging goods.

=== Valongo Wharf ===
In 2011, the Valongo Wharf, the largest port for the arrival of enslaved Africans in Brazil, the country where the majority of enslaved Africans were transported in the Atlantic slave trade, was excavated in Rio de Janeiro. Excavations were conducted with the specific goals of challenging racism, aversion to discussing topics of slavery, and discussing the legacy of slavery in contemporary society. Found at the site were artifacts and symbols associated with African religious traditions, such as cowries and anthropomorphic stones. The archaeologists, in collaboration with the descendant communities and Afro-Brazilian religious leaders, acquiesced to their right to interpret these findings. The site became a place of ancestor remembrance for some in the Afro-Brazilian community, and collaboration increased to include Afro-Brazilian social activists. The site, however, was largely ignored by the Afro-Brazilian population as well as the population as a whole. According to Valongo Wharf Archaeologist Tania Andrade and others, this is in part due to the desire of many Afro-Brazilian descendants to distance themselves from the difficult past of slavery as well as associated stigmas and the discomfort of white Brazilians in bringing to the forefront Black experiences of subjugation and cruelty at the hands of Europeans. The site has since gained a greater presence in Brazil with the publication of literature and through activism. The site has also gained a global presence through its inscription on the UNESCO World Heritage List in 2017, recognizing the Valongo wharf as a site of world heritage of universal value.

== Cuba ==
The study of the African diaspora through archaeology began in Cuba with the study of slavery and fugitive slaves, starting heavily in the 1960s in parallel with that of the United States Archaeology of Plantations, although archaeology has been conducted earlier. Archaeologist Eladio Elso conducted research at cimarrones (impermanent fugitive slave encampments) in 1946 in Pinar del Río. Interest in Afro-Cuban archaeology increased after the Cuban Revolution, when Cuba was officially proclaimed a socialist nation. Cuban history and archaeology were deemed to be of national importance, alongside themes of resistance and struggle.

=== Cimarrones ===
Since 1983, archaeologist Gabino La Rosa Corzo has worked on the archaeology of slavery under themes of resistance, daily life, subsistence, and transculturation at sites in Cuba. through research at 30 cimarrones, all of which are rock shelters or caves, in the Havana-Matanza upland region of Cuba. La Rosa Corzo has found artifacts and remnants of objects used in the lives of fugitive slaves that are claimed to show cultural continuity from African traditions as well as cultural transformation and dependencies on plantations or stores. Found among the sites were items such as pottery, machetes, knives, hoes, and pipes. La Rosa Corzo found evidence that fugitive slaves created pottery using techniques that were likely of African origin, distinct from Indigenous and European techniques found in Cuba. The archaeologist also found in food remains that fugitives hunted and used natural resources as well as resources from haciendas (plantations), adding to and contrasting archival records that only describe theft from haciendas. Among the assemblages found were clay cones called "hormas,” which were used in the processing of cane sugar. La Rosa Corzo claims that sugar consumption became a habit induced by life on sugar plantations. Decorations are also found on smoking pipes called “cachimbas” that have decorations or symbols that resemble those found in African traditions, where many of the enslaved in Cuba originated. The archaeologist also challenged historical documents that claimed the diet of those enslaved on plantations was the same as that of fugitives and that fugitive diets lacked African elements. These points have been challenged by archaeological evidence of the consumption of more varied and fresher foods at fugitive sites than at plantation sites and the retention of soup-based traditions from Africa.

== Peru ==
The Haciendas of Nasca archaeological project, or PAHN, established in 2009, is the first Peruvian archaeological project focused on slavery and the African Diaspora. The project engages in Afro-Peruvian and African Diaspora archaeology that focuses on engagement with the Peruvian public while collaborating with descendant communities, similar to the methods used at the African Burial Ground in New York. PAHN attempts to use archaeology to address contemporary issues such as the legacy of slavery and racism.

== The United States ==
African Diaspora Archaeology in the Americas first emerged as a specialty and has received the most attention in the United States coming from the research of African American Historical Archaeology. The history of racism, the glorification of “great men," and the exclusion of women in archaeology made it so that African American archaeology did not become a serious area of interest in archaeology until the 1960s, during the civil rights movement, with excavations prodded by civil rights activists with goals of preserving and protecting locations of historic importance to Africans as well as the Beautification Project of First Lady Lady Bird Johnson which inspired a movement for the protection of historic buildings. Sites previously not of archeological significance were studied, and those deemed to be important but excluded the enslaved were reexamined, such as at Monticello.

=== Kingsley Plantation ===
An early excavation in African American archaeology was the Kingsley Plantation Enslaved Quarters in 1969. Sanctioned by the Florida State Park in the hope of using information from the excavation in a recreation of enslaved quarters. The archaeologist charged with excavating, Charles Fairbanks, saw the opportunity to uncover information unrecorded to history on the creations of enslaved Africans and “Africanisms'' (expressions of African culture carried and persisting in the Americas) that Fairbanks hoped would provide an archaeological link between Africa and Florida.

=== Colono Ware ===
Leland Ferguson, through the 1970s and 1980s, conducted plantation archaeology in South Carolina, Virginia, and Florida and connected low-fired pottery called Colono Ware to enslaved Africans. Ferguson claimed that artifacts maintained features of African culture and symbolism. Archaeologists before Ferguson had only attributed this type of pottery to Indigenous Americans, never connecting this type of pottery, which exhibits features of Indigenous, European, and African design, to enslaved Africans.

=== African Burial Grounds ===
The African Burial Grounds project in New York has addressed issues of racism, white hegemony within the field of archaeology, and the role of descendant communities in interpretation and participation. A research team under the direction of anthropologist and archaeologist Michael Blakey beginning in 1992 began using a descendant community collaboration approach after outcry from the New York Black citizens against the work of archaeologists previously engaged in archaeology at the site. The first team acting under the Historic Preservation Act and conducting archaeology on the burial grounds due to the construction of a government building, according to Blakey, failed to heed the concerns of the community. According to Blakey, this team failed to consider community issues with research questions and focused on the then-common practice of using race as a biological feature rather than a social construct. The original team also lacked insight from African American perspectives and knowledge of African history. The second team, under Blakey, with permission from the descendant community, transported 419 human remains to the Cobb biological laboratory at Howard University for analysis, denying the use of race as a biological feature. Archaeology at the African burial grounds was conducted with insight from collaboration between disciplines and knowledge of African history. Archaeology at the African Burial Grounds is credited with bringing awareness to the history of slavery in New York when it created the idea of the descendant community and collaboration between archaeologists and the descendant community, with the interests of the descendant community prioritized as an ethical human right. The remains of those from the burial grounds have since been reinterred, and today a monument has been dedicated.

== See also ==
- Indigenous archaeology
