= Jennifer Caruso =

Aboriginal Australian historian, educator and community leader

Jennifer Caruso AM

Member of the South Australian First Nations Voice for Central
- Incumbent
- Assumed office 12 December 2024
- Preceded by: Position established

Personal details
- Born: Jennifer Lorraine Caruso Alice Springs, Northern Territory, Australia
- Party: Independent
- Children: Pat
- Education: University of Adelaide (BA; PhD)
- Occupation: Historian; educator; consultant; community advocate
- Website: University profile

Jennifer Lorraine Caruso is an Aboriginal Australian historian, educator, cultural consultant and community advocate of Eastern Arrernte and Waanyi descent, with Afghan ancestry. A member of the Stolen Generations, her work focuses on policies concerning the removal of Aboriginal children and the impact of colonisation on Aboriginal communities.

Caruso was stolen from her family in Alice Springs in 1957 and brought to the Methodist mission at Croker Island, before being adopted into a white family in Adelaide. When she was 15 years old, Caruso worked as a resident nurse in North Adelaide. At the age of 35, Caruso returned to studying, completing her secondary school studies and earning an undergraduate degree and an honours degree thereafter. In 2018, Caruso completed her PhD in history at the University of Adelaide, looking at the history of the Croker Island mission based on archives and personal experiences of removal.

Caruso started lecturing at the University of Adelaide in 1999, becoming later an adjunct lecturer and researcher. She has also been responsible for coordinating the Yaitya Purruna Indigenous Health Unit at the university. As part of Saltbush Consulting, she offers cultural advice and historical education to government departments, organisations and community groups regarding Aboriginal history. Her historical work includes research about William Wyatt for the Wyatt Trust.

In 2016, Caruso became chair of the South Australian Stolen Generations Aboriginal Corporation, and in 2022 she became member of The Healing Foundation's Stolen Generations Reference Group. In her advocacy, she talks about reparations, access to historical information, cultural reconnection and trauma-informed aged care. She became a member of the Central regional body of the South Australian First Nations Voice to Parliament in 2024 and re-elected in 2026. In that same year, Caruso was appointed a Member of the Order of Australia in the King's Birthday Honours for significant service to the Indigenous communities of South Australia.

== Early life and education ==
Jennifer Lorraine Caruso is of Eastern Arrernte descent through her mother and of Waanyi descent through her father with Afghan descent. Caruso is of the Sultan family with members who served as stockmen and camels.

In 1957, she was taken away from her family in Alice Springs when she was three years old. Caruso and her brothers first went to Kahlin Compound in Darwin then to the Croker Island Methodist Mission. She was later adopted by a white family in Adelaide where she remembers being five years old when she arrived at Adelaide Airport. Caruso experienced many child separations from her siblings and family members as well as the loss of her language.

Caruso took an interest in history during her school days with a focus on Greek history. When she turned 15, her adoptive parents said that they would no longer support her and she became a resident nurse in North Adelaide.

While raising her children, Caruso ensured that they were proud of their Aboriginality and defined their own. Concerned about them being removed as well, Caruso was an active volunteer at their primary school, where she worked in the library and canteen and covered the books in order to stay close.

At the age of 35, Caruso went back to school and got her Year 12 certificate, as a mature age student. Encouraged by her teachers to attend university, she continued studying while working on a full-time basis. Caruso once called her education a 30-year process.

Caruso remembered that she talked to another Aboriginal individual for the first time when she was around 38 or 39 years old, after the birth of her daughter and having started work in education. She was able to meet up with her mother and other siblings in her early forties. This meeting was possible through the Link-Up SA program of Nunkuwarrin Yunti when her son Pat was about 15 years old. She met her mother before she died and later built relationships within her family and community.

In her mid-40s, Caruso questioned herself about what was expected from her as part of assimilation. She graduated from University of Adelaide at 48 years old and got her Bachelor of Arts with honours at 52.

== Academic career ==
Caruso has experience as an Aboriginal program officer and academic advisor in the University of Adelaide. She was introduced to work with a history lecturer as a coordinator for Aboriginal history courses, after which she took up a lecturer job in the Department of History. Caruso took up lecturing in 1999, teaching Indigenous history.

Caruso was a coordinator of the Yaitya Purruna Indigenous Health Unit of the university and served on its Aboriginal and Torres Strait Islander Employment Committee by October 2006. She helped the Aboriginal and Torres Strait Islander Employment Officer, Shane Mohor, develop the university's Aboriginal and Torres Strait Islander Employment Strategy 2006–2009: Furthering Commitment through Practice.

In 2018, Caruso received her doctorate degree at the University of Adelaide. Her thesis titled Dream Phantasy of a Utopia: The Making of the Methodist Half-Caste Mission of Croker Island explored the relationship between the church, government, and academia, in particular anthropology, in the creation of the mission. Caruso also became the first Aboriginal woman to write a doctoral dissertation on the Stolen Generations. Her thesis was based on her personal experience of being removed, she created a methodology which included a placement of her personal story and Aboriginal people's stories at the core of history analysis through the use of colonial archives.

As of March 2022, she was an adjunct lecturer at the University of Adelaide.

== Cultural and community work ==
In 2016, Caruso was appointed as chairperson of the South Australian Stolen Generations Aboriginal Corporation.

In 2020, Caruso participated in the exhibition called Women's Work featuring portraits. This exhibition first took place at Sparkke at the Whitmore and later at the South Australian Museum from 6 November until 6 December. It was an exhibition of photographs taken by Wayne Quilliam and curated by Rebecca Richards. She referred to viewing her portrait as a healing process which allowed her to see herself not as a child who was taken away but as an adult woman.

As of 2021, Caruso became a director and cultural and diversity consultant at Saltbush Consulting. Through Saltbush Consulting, she gives lessons on Aboriginal history and the lasting impacts of colonisation, including government policies, institutions, Aboriginal art and literature, and political movements.

In 2022, Caruso became a member of the Stolen Generations Reference Group at The Healing Foundation. By June 2022, she was working on a truth-telling project about the life of William Wyatt, who founded the Wyatt Trust, and the impact he had on Aboriginal people. Caruso studied the ideologies which shaped Wyatt, his role in Adelaide's colonial elite, and those for whom his legacy was intended.

Working with both Aboriginal and non-Aboriginal women academics, Caruso looked into Wyatt's land ownership and such issues as Aboriginal displacement, employment, payments, and domestic work.

Caruso was identified as a consultant of Saltbush Consulting for the bronze statue of Fay Gale by Meliesa Judge from 2024 to 2025. This sculpture was ordered by the University of Adelaide and produced by Guildhouse, part of the university's North Terrace Campus Public Realm Plan.

Caruso has also served on the Aboriginal Reference Group for the State Library of South Australia and State Records.

== Political career and advocacy ==
In January 2020, Caruso was selected as one of the participants in Adelaide Writers' Week. It was planned that she would be participating in a conversation about the ongoing trauma caused by Aboriginal child removal policies alongside Antonio Buti, the author of A Stolen Life, on 5 March.

In the 2024 South Australian First Nations Voice election, Caruso was unsuccessful for the Regional One (Central) of the South Australian First Nations Voice to Parliament, known as Kumangka Warrarna Wangkanthi, receiving only 41 first-preference votes. However, on 12 December 2024, Caruso was appointed into Regional One (Central).

In early September 2024, Caruso attended a Healing Foundation event of Stolen Generations survivors and their supporters in Darwin, where she visited the former location of Kahlin Compound. She brought up the importance of culturally appropriate, trauma-informed aged care, as the institutionalisation may trigger survivors' trauma from childhood experiences. She additionally supported further collaboration for implementation of recommendations from Bringing Them Home.

On 12 December 2024, Caruso was appointed to the Regional One of the First Nations Voice to Parliament.

In the 2026 South Australian First Nations Voice election, Caruso was successfully re-elected to be a member of Regional One, obtaining 110 first preference votes and 156 votes altogether. Her victory was announced on 1 April 2026.

== Recognition and honours ==
In 2011, Caruso was honoured with the University of Adelaide Vice-Chancellor and President Award for Outstanding Contribution to Aboriginal and Torres Strait Islander Education and Engagement.

Caruso was given the Gladys Elphick Quiet Achiever Award in 2017. She was awarded the South Australian NAIDOC Lifetime Achievement Award and the University of Adelaide's Graduate Deans' Commendation for Doctoral Thesis Excellence in 2018.

Caruso made it to the South Australian Women's Honour Roll and was shortlisted for the Premier's NAIDOC Award in 2019. In 2023, Caruso was awarded the South Australian NAIDOC Elder of the Year.

Caruso was made a Member of the Order of Australia (AM) for significant service to the Indigenous communities of South Australia in the 2026 King's Birthday Honours.

== Personal life ==
Caruso has a son named Pat, the founder and director of We Create Print Deliver.
