= 2024 South Australian First Nations Voice election =

Election for a legislated body of Indigenous Australian representatives

- 16 March 2024

The 2024 South Australian First Nations Voice election was held on 16 March 2024 to elect the inaugural members of the First Nations Voice to Parliament, an advisory body for Indigenous Australians to the Parliament of South Australia.

Unlike state and federal elections, voting was not compulsory, and voter turnout was low.

== Background ==
After the election of a state Labor government in 2022, new Premier Peter Malinauskas pledged to implement this state-based Voice to Parliament.

The bill passed in a special Sunday sitting of parliament on 26 March 2023 and was given royal assent immediately afterwards.

The SA Voice to Parliament was established by legislation and is not enshrined in the constitution of South Australia. Dale Agius is the South Australian First Nations Voice Commissioner, in charge of the process to create the new body.

Implementation of the SA Voice was delayed for six months owing to possible confusion introduced by the debate about the national referendum on a national Voice in October.

After the 2023 Australian Indigenous Voice referendum in which over 60% of South Australians voted against the Voice, state Liberal leader David Speirs cast some doubt on the state voice. One Nation MP Sarah Game announced plans to introduce a bill calling for the First Nations Voice Act 2023 to be repealed.

== Constituencies and process ==
There are six electoral constituencies, and unlike state and federal elections, voting is not compulsory. Around 14,000 Aboriginal people live in Adelaide, and between 3,000 and 4,000 in each of five regional constituencies. There are 11 representatives for the central Adelaide Voice, and seven for each regional Voice, making a total of 46.

Candidate nominations opened on 22 January 2024. By 1 March 2024, 113 people had nominated to stand as candidates, with over a third from Adelaide.

The elections for the SA body took place on 16 March 2024, and vote counting began on 25 March, to allow for all postal votes to be received.

== Outcome ==
Turnout was reported to be low, with fewer than 10% of eligible electors voting. However, Aboriginal Affairs Minister Kyam Maher described it as a successful election, saying that the Voice was "well on track", and that it would take time to build awareness and engagement. One of the successful candidates, Douglas Clinch, attributed the low turnout partly to the lack of attention given to the election by mainstream media.

== First meeting ==
The inaugural meeting of the 12-member Voice, held on 12 June 2024, elected Central region representative Tahlia Wanganeen and West Coast representative Leeroy Bilney as presiding members, who would be delegated to speak to Parliament.

== Results ==
The results of the election were as follows:

=== Central ===
2024 South Australian First Nations Voice election: Central
Party	Candidate	Votes	%	±%
Quota		95		
Independent Greens	Moogy Sumner (elected)	178	15.8	
Independent	Susan Dixon (elected)	93	8.2	
Independent	April Lawrie (elected)	70	6.2	
Independent	Deb Moyle (elected)	65	5.8	
Independent	Douglas Clinch (elected)	58	5.1	
Independent	Cheryl Axleby (elected)	44	3.9	
Independent	Rosalind Coleman (elected)	44	3.9	
Independent	Marnie O'Meara	43	3.8	
Independent	Tahlia Wanganeen (elected)	46	3.6	
Independent	Jennifer Caruso	41	3.6	
Independent	Khatija Thomas	35	3.1	
Independent	Patricia Waria-Read	30	2.7	
Independent	Robert Leidig (elected)	27	2.4	
Independent	Scott Wilson (elected)	25	2.2	
Independent	Harold Stewart	22	1.9	
Independent	Yvonne Agius	20	1.8	
Independent	Kim O'Donnell	20	1.8	
Independent	John Carbine	19	1.7	
Independent	Tony Wayne Minniecon (elected)	19	1.7	
Independent	Chris Rigney-Thyer	19	1.7	
Independent	Kimberley Wanganeen	19	1.7	
Independent	Sonia Waters	19	1.7	
Independent	Kylie O'Loughlin	18	1.6	
Independent	Sherrell Dyer (Bonney-Williams)	17	1.5	
Independent	Sandy Miller	15	1.3	
Independent	Isaiah Rigney	15	1.3	
Independent	Jakirah Telfer	14	1.2	
Independent	John Lochowiak	13	1.2	
Independent	Cheryl Lynn Saunders	13	1.2	
Independent	Cheryl Cairns	12	1.1	
Independent	Phillip Sumner-Graham	9	0.8	
Independent	Gloria Fernandes	7	0.6	
Independent	Naomi Marie Hicks	7	0.6	
Independent	Debra Rose Axleby	6	0.5	
Independent	Anna Schkabaryn	6	0.5	
Independent	Evelyn Varcoe	6	0.5	
Independent	Jane Nelson	5	0.4	
Independent	Stacey Bates	4	0.4	
Independent	Michael S. Turner	4	0.4	
Independent	Courtney Hunter-Hebberman	3	0.3	
Independent	Raymond Sumner	0	0.0	
Total formal votes		1,130	98.7	
Informal votes		15	1.3	
Turnout		1,145		

=== Far North ===
2024 South Australian First Nations Voice election: Far North
Party	Candidate	Votes	%	±%
Quota		38		
Independent	Mark Campbell (elected)	70	23.3	
Independent	Melissa Thompson (elected)	52	17.3	
Independent	Johnathon Lyons (elected)	49	16.3	
Independent	Christopher Dodd (elected)	26	8.6	
Independent	Dharma Ducasse-Singer (elected)	26	8.6	
Independent	Dean Robin Walker	24	8.0	
Independent	Donald Fraser (elected)	18	6.0	
Independent	Jonathon Fatt-Clifton	14	4.7	
Independent	Dawn Brown (elected)	11	3.7	
Independent	Sharon E. Ah Chee	5	1.7	
Independent	Anna Strzelecki	4	1.3	
Independent	Ian Crombie	2	0.7	
Independent	Sandra Taylor	0	0.0	
Total formal votes		301	98.7	
Informal votes		4	1.3	
Turnout		305		

=== Flinders and Upper North ===
2024 South Australian First Nations Voice election: Flinders and Upper North
Party	Candidate	Votes	%	±%
Quota		48		
Independent	Charles Jackson (elected)	70	18.5	
Independent	Lavene Ngatokorua (elected)	47	12.4	
Independent	Rob Singleton (elected)	40	10.6	
Independent	Kerri Coulthard (elected)	38	10.1	
Independent	Ralph Coulthard (elected)	35	9.3	
Independent	Candace Champion (elected)	28	7.4	
Independent	T.J. Thomas (elected)	27	7.1	
Independent	Darcy Coulthard	24	6.3	
Independent	Janette Milera	21	5.6	
Independent	Dawn Likouresis	18	4.8	
Independent	John Reid	15	4.0	
Independent	Garry Victor Burgoyne	14	3.7	
Independent	Tataka Stella Newland	1	0.3	
Total formal votes		378	99.5	
Informal votes		2	0.5	
Turnout		380		

=== Riverland and South East ===
2024 South Australian First Nations Voice election: Riverland and South East
Party	Candidate	Votes	%	±%
Quota		36		
Independent	Danni Smith (elected)	69	24.2	
Independent	Eunice Aston (elected)	37	13.0	
Independent	Sheryl Giles (elected)	33	11.6	
Independent	Rob Wright (elected)	28	9.8	
Independent	Tim Hartman (elected)	26	9.1	
Independent	Darryle Barnes (elected)	17	6.0	
Independent	Lisa Rigney (elected)	17	6.0	
Independent	Cheryle Saunders	17	6.0	
Independent	David Paul Crompton	11	3.9	
Independent	Freda Mills	9	3.2	
Independent	Dan Mitchell-Matthews	9	3.2	
Independent	Christine Abdulla	5	1.8	
Independent	Michael Harris	5	1.8	
Independent	Lauren Letton	2	0.7	
Total formal votes		285	98.6	
Informal votes		4	1.4	
Turnout		289		

=== West and West Coast ===
2024 South Australian First Nations Voice election: West and West Coast
Party	Candidate	Votes	%	±%
Quota		46		
Independent	Jack Johncock (elected)	80	22.2	
Independent	Lorraine Haseldine (elected)	50	13.9	
Independent	Cecelia Cox (elected)	44	12.2	
Independent	Duane Edwards (elected)	40	11.1	
Independent	Leeroy Bilney (elected)	36	10.0	
Independent	Keenan Smith (elected)	17	4.7	
Independent	Robert Larking	15	4.2	
Independent	Rebecca Miller (elected)	12	3.3	
Independent	Roslyn Peters	12	3.3	
Independent	Dora Queama	12	3.3	
Independent	Evelyn Walker	12	3.3	
Independent	Lorraine Garay	10	2.8	
Independent	Robert Miller	4	1.1	
Independent	Shania Richards	4	1.1	
Independent	Rob Walsh	4	1.1	
Independent	Mark Young	4	1.1	
Independent	Denise Baker	3	0.8	
Independent	Cameron Bridley	1	0.3	
Independent	Fiona May	0	0.0	
Total formal votes		360	97.8	
Informal votes		8	2.2	
Turnout		368		

=== Yorke and Mid-North ===
2024 South Australian First Nations Voice election: Yorke and Mid-North
Party	Candidate	Votes	%	±%
Quota		17		
Independent	Raymond Wanganeen (elected)	24	18.6	
Independent	Doug Milera (elected)	20	15.5	
Independent	Quentin Agius (elected)	16	12.4	
Independent	Joy Makepeace (elected)	14	10.9	
Independent	Rex Angie	11	8.5	
Independent	Eddie Newchurch (elected)	11	8.5	
Independent	Kaylene O'Loughlin (elected)	10	7.8	
Independent	Ken Tilbrook	6	4.7	
Independent	Denise Wanganeen (elected)	6	4.7	
Independent	Josh Jenner	5	3.9	
Independent	Mathew Brice	3	2.3	
Independent	Lorraine Karpany	3	2.3	
Independent	Robert Rigney	0	0.0	
Total formal votes		129	97.7	
Informal votes		3	2.3	
Turnout		132		
