= Heather Burke =

Australian archaeologist (born 1966)

Heather Burke FAHA
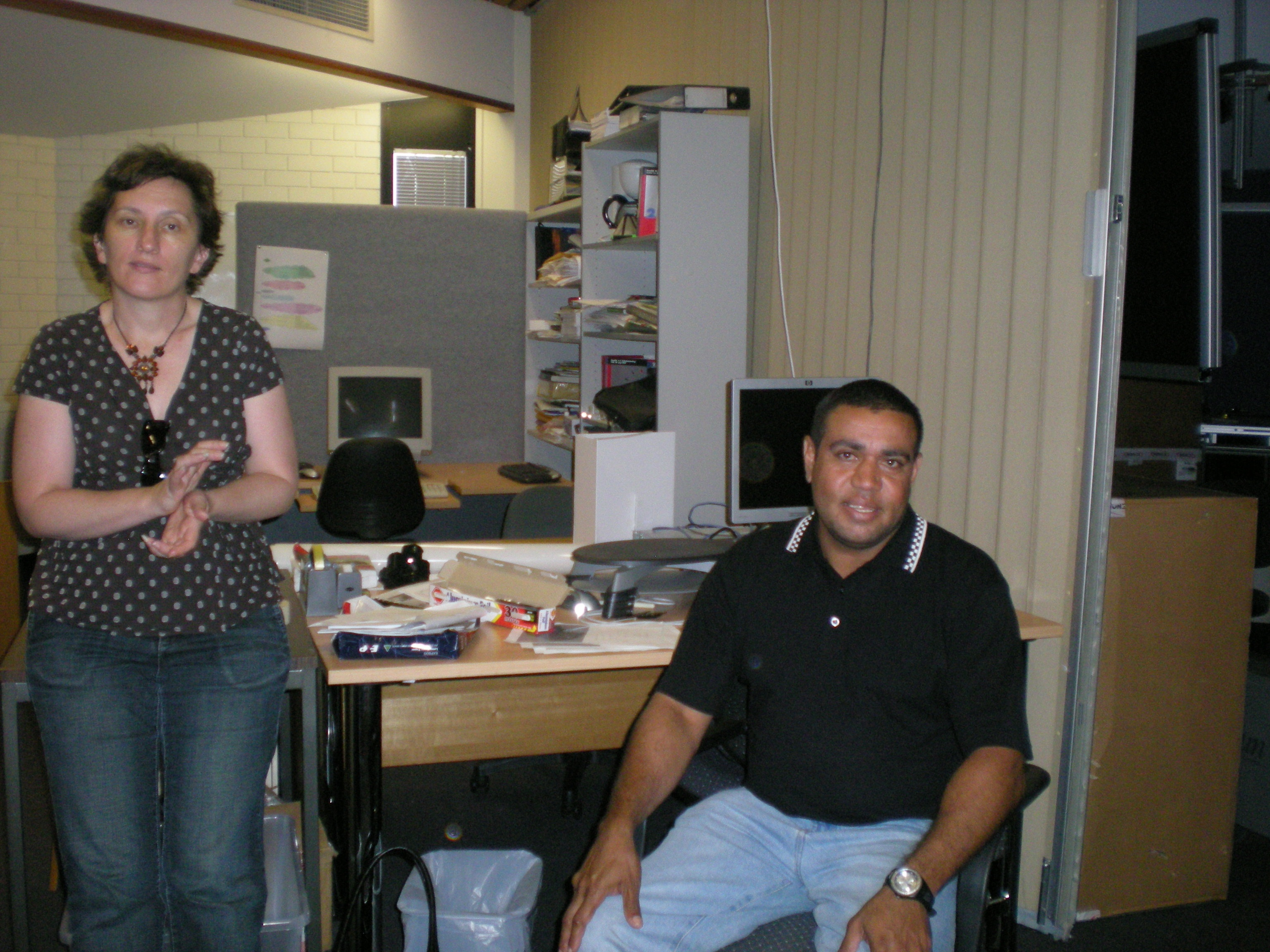
- Born: 1966 (age 59–60)

Academic background
- Education: University of New England
- Thesis: Investments of Meaning: An Archaeology of Style, Social Identity, Capitalism and Ideology in a Nineteenth Century Australian Town

Heather Burke FAHA (born 1966) is an Australian historical archaeologist and a professor in the College of Humanities, Arts and Social Sciences at Flinders University.

== Early life and education ==
Burke attended Mount Cotton State School and Marymount College (Gold Coast, Queensland). Burke obtained a bachelor's degree in archaeology from the University of New England in 1987, and a PhD from the same university in 1997. Her doctoral thesis investigated the expression of ideology through architectural style in the city of Armidale, New South Wales, during the period 1830–1930. It was published in 1999 as Meaning and Ideology in Historical Archaeology.

== Family and personal life ==
Heather Burke was born at the Mater Hospital, Brisbane, to Roma Burke (née Dean), formerly Askew, and Peter Burke in 1966. She is the youngest of four children; Terry, Lyndell and Robyn.

In a 2022 interview with Emily Kessel, Burke emphasised how she 'looks forward' to one of her family's traditions, watching Sharknado every Christmas in North Queensland.

== Career ==
In her earlier life, Burke found an interest in the area of archaeology and pursued it as a PhD.

After completing her PhD, Burke worked in consulting archaeology, having previously taught briefly at the University of New England. She was subsequently employed within the archaeology program at Flinders University, where she is currently a professor.

From 2011 to 2015, she was the co-editor of the journal Australian Archaeology.

Burke has called for improving graduate programs in archaeology to better prepare students for positions outside of academic research. Together with Claire Smith, in 2004 she published the first edition of The Archaeologist's Field Handbook, a standard manual for teaching archaeological field methods, which was revised and expanded for a second edition in 2017 (the latter published with Michael Morrison). Burke and Claire Smith were recipients of the 2004 Vice Chancellor's Award for Excellence in Teaching (Team Award).

As an archaeologist, Burke spends her time in laboratory-based classes, lecture-based classes, helping students design research projects, or spending long periods of time in various parts of Australia. Burke spends a significant portion in the field, searching for and recording artefacts and sites, excavating sites, and recording contemporary oral histories about why places are important to people today.

Burke starred in the 2022 SBS documentary, "The Australian Wars", to present her knowledge on the frontier wars in early Australian history.

=== Research and grants ===
Burke's current research focuses primarily on processes of contact and colonialism on the Australian frontier. She is a chief investigator of the ARC-funded project "Archaeology of the Native Mounted Police", which is investigating the experience of life in the Queensland NMP, Aboriginal and non-Aboriginal memories of the NMP, and the institution's history and development. She is also part of the team (which includes the Western Cape Communities Central Sub-Regional Trust (Weipa) and the Queensland Museum) studying Indigenous foodways in the Cape York Peninsula, Far North Queensland.

She was elected a Fellow of the Australian Academy of the Humanities in 2021.

Burke is involved as an investigator in multiple active grants, recorded by The Australian Research Council (ARC). The project "Slow" Digitisation, Community Heritage and the Objects of Martindale Hall' commenced on 1 October 2020 and is anticipated to end 30 September 2023. By utilising knowledge on Martindale Hall, SA, and the historically significant objects it contains, the investigation will focus on how community history, heritage, and cultural collections can be better preserved and made accessible through slow digitisation techniques. A concurrent project, 'Fugitive Traces: Reconstructing Yulluna Experiences of the Frontier (2021-2024), is a collaboration of Indigenous peoples, archaeologists, historians, anthropologists, museum curators and educators to create the first sustained history of a hitherto elusive Aboriginal experience of the frontier. It uses oral histories of a prominent Aboriginal family whose history is involved with the Queensland Native Mounted Police. A third project, 'Aboriginal Rock Art and Cultural Heritage Management in Cape York Peninsula' (2020-2025) documents generations of Aboriginal Australians from their original settlement, through major environmental changes, to European invasion through the analysis of rock art in the Laura Sandstone Basin of Cape York Peninsula.

== Selected publications ==
Books

- H. Burke, M. Morrison and C. Smith (2017). The Archaeologist's Field Handbook. Sydney: Allen & Unwin. 2nd edition.ISBN 9781743318065.
- H. Burke, C. Smith and L. Zimmerman (2008). The Archaeologist's Field Handbook. North American Edition. Walnut Creek, CA: AltaMira Press. ISBN 0-7591-0882-X.
- H. Burke, C. Smith, D. Lippert, J. Watkins and L. Zimmerman (eds.) (2008). Kennewick: Perspectives on the Ancient One. Walnut Grove, CA: Left Coast Press. ISBN 978-1-59874-347-0.
- H. Burke and C. Smith. Archaeology to Delight and Instruct. Active Learning in the University Classroom (2007). Walnut Creek, CA: Left Coast Press. ISBN 978-1-59874-256-5.
- I. Domingo, H. Burke and C. Smith (2007). Manual de Campo Para Arqueologos. Barcelona: Ariel Editorial. ISBN 978-84-344-5231-2.
- C. Smith and H. Burke (2007). Digging it up Down Under: A Practical Guide to Doing Archaeology in Australia. New York: Springer. ISBN 0-387-35260-0.
- H. Burke and C. Smith (2004). The Archaeologist's Field Handbook. Sydney: Allen & Unwin. 1st edition. ISBN 1-86508-862-5.
- H. Burke (1999). Meaning and Ideology in Historical Archaeology: Style, Social Identity, and Capitalism in an Australian Town. New York: Plenum. ISBN 978-0-306-46066-1.

Journal Articles

- Smith, C., Burke, H.D., Ralph, J., Pollard, K., Gorman, A.C., Wilson, C.J., et al. (2019). Pursuing social justice through collaborative archaeologies in Aboriginal Australia. Archaeologies 15: 536–569.
- Auld, D., Ireland, T. and Burke, H.D. (2019). Affective Aprons: Object Biographies from the Ladies' Cottage, Royal Derwent Hospital, New Norfolk, Tasmania. International Journal of Historical Archaeology 23(2): 361–379.
- Muller, S.W., Burke, H.D., De Leiuen, C., Degner, H. and Farrell, Z. (2019). 'Childness': an alternative approach to the archaeology of childhood through cemetery studies. Religions 10(8): 1–15.
- Burke, H.D., Barker, B., Cole, N., Wallis, L.A., Hatte, E., Davidson, I., et al. (2018). The Queensland Native Police and strategies of recruitment on the Queensland Frontier 1849–1901. Journal of Australian Studies 42(3): 297-313.
- Roberts, A.L., Van Duivenvoorde, W., Morrison, M.J., Moffat, I.A., Burke, H.D., Kowlessar, J., et al. (2017). 'They call 'im Crowie': An investigation of the Aboriginal significance attributed to a wrecked River Murray barge in South Australia. International Journal of Nautical Archaeology 46(1): 132–148.
- Wallis, L.A., Davidson, I., Burke, H.D., Mitchell, S.A., Barker, B., Hatte, E., et al. (2017). Aboriginal stone huts along the Georgina River, southwest Queensland. Queensland Archaeological Research 20: 1–8.
- Burke, H.D., Wallis, L.A., Barker, B., Tutty, M.J., Cole, N., Davidson, I., et al. (2017). The homestead as fortress: fact or folklore? Aboriginal History 41: 151–177.
- Smith, C.E., Burke, H.D., De Leiuen, C. and Jackson, G.T. (2016). The Islamic State's symbolic war: Socially mediated terrorism as a threat to cultural heritage. Journal of Social Archaeology 16(2): 164–188.
- Burke, H.D., Roberts, A.L., Morrison, M.J. and Sullivan, V. (2016). The space of conflict: Aboriginal/European interactions and frontier violence on the Western Central Murray, South Australia, 1830–1841. Aboriginal History 40: 145–179.
- Burke, H.D., Arthure, S.A. and De Leiuen, C. (2016). A context for concealment: the historical archaeology of folk ritual and superstition in Australia. International Journal of Historical Archaeology, 20(1): 45–72.
- C. Smith and H. Burke (2006). "Glass Ceilings, Glass Parasols and Australian Academic Archaeology." Australian Archaeology 62: 13–25.

== See also ==
- Claire Smith
