= Koji Mizoguchi =

Japanese archaeologist

- Born: 1963 (age 62–63); Kitakyushu, Japan
- Education: University of Cambridge
- Scientific career
- Fields: Archaeology

Koji Mizoguchi (born in 1963) is a Japanese archaeologist and a professor of social archaeology in the Graduate School of Social and Cultural Studies at Kyushu University. He studies the comparative emergence of societies in Europe and Japan and has a particular interest in the history of archaeology. He currently serving as the sixth president of the World Archaeological Congress, serves as director of the Advanced Asian Archaeology Research Center at Kyushu University, and is an elected fellow of the London Society of Antiquaries. He has been involved in numerous archaeological projects, and is currently a co-director (with Julian Thomas and Keith Ray) of the project ‘Beneath Hay Bluff: prehistoric south-west Herefordshire, c.4000-1500 BC.'

== Biography ==
Koji was born in 1963 in Kitakyushu, Japan. After obtaining his PhD in archaeology from the University of Cambridge, in 1995, he became an associate professor in archaeology at the Kyushu University's Graduate School of Social and Cultural Studies. He was promoted as Professor in 2013.

== Awards ==
- In 2006, he was awarded the Japan Society for the Promotion of Science Prize.

== Works ==
=== Articles and chapters in edited volumes ===
- Mizoguchi, K. (1992). "A Historiography of a Linear Barrow Cemetery : A Structurationist's Point of View". Archaeological Review from Cambridge. 11 (1): 39–50. ISSN 0261-4332.
- Mizoguchi, Koji (1993-10-01). "Time in the reproduction of mortuary practices". World Archaeology. 25 (2): 223–235. doi:10.1080/00438243.1993.9980239. ISSN 0043-8243. PMID 16475283.
- Mizoguchi, Koji (1997). "The reproduction of archaeological discourse: the case of Japan". Journal of European Archaeology. 5 (2): 149–165. doi:10.1179/096576697800660339. ISSN 0965-7665.
- Mizoguchi, Koji (2005). "Genealogy in the ground: observations of jar burials of the Yayoi period, northern Kyushu, Japan". Antiquity. 79 (304): 316–326. doi:10.1017/S0003598X00114115. ISSN 0003-598X. S2CID 162849014.
- Mizoguchi, Koji (2009). "Nodes and edges: A network approach to hierarchisation and state formation in Japan". Journal of Anthropological Archaeology. 28 (1): 14–26. doi:10.1016/j.jaa.2008.12.001. ISSN 0278-4165.
- Mizoguchi, K. (2013). "Evolution of prestige good systems: An application of network analysis to the transformation of communication systems and their media". In Knappett, Carl (ed.). Network Analysis in Archaeology: New Approaches to Regional Interaction. OUP Oxford. ISBN 978-0-19-969709-0.
- Mizoguchi, Koji (2015). "A future of archaeology". Antiquity. 89 (343): 12–22. doi:10.15184/aqy.2014.39. ISSN 0003-598X. S2CID 161461159.
- Mizoguchi, K. (2016). "The Colonial Experience of the Uncolonized and Colonized: The Case". In Lydon, Jane; Rizvi, Uzma Z. (eds.). Handbook of Postcolonial Archaeology. Routledge. doi:10.4324/9781315427690. ISBN 9781315427683.

=== Books ===
- Mizoguchi, Koji (2002). An Archaeological History of Japan, 30,000 B.C. to A.D. 700. University of Pennsylvania Press. ISBN 978-0-8122-3651-4.
- Mizoguchi, Koji (2006). Archaeology, society and identity in modern Japan. Cambridge University Press. ISBN 978-0-521-84953-1.
- Mizoguchi, Koji (2013-11-25). The Archaeology of Japan: From the Earliest Rice Farming Villages to the Rise of the State. Cambridge University Press. ISBN 978-0-521-88490-7.
- Mizoguchi, Koji; Smith, Claire E. (2019). Global Social Archaeologies: Making a Difference in a World of Strangers. Routledge. ISBN 978-1-000-59675-5.
