= 2026 South Australian First Nations Voice election =

Election for a legislated body of Indigenous Australian representatives

- 21 March 2026

All 46 seats on the 8 Regional Voices
- Turnout: 3,362 (▲)
	First party	Second party
	IND	IND
Party	Independent; Incumbents	Independent; Newcomers
Candidates	27	37
Elected	24	22

The 2026 South Australian First Nations Voice election was held on 21 March 2026 to elect the First Nations Voice to Parliament, an advisory body for Indigenous Australians to the Parliament of South Australia. The election was held on the same day as the South Australian state election.

== Constituencies and process ==
There are six electoral constituencies, and unlike state and federal elections, voting is not compulsory. Around 14,000 Aboriginal people live in Adelaide, and between 3,000 and 4,000 in each of five regional constituencies. There are 11 representatives for the central Adelaide Voice, and seven for each regional Voice, making a total of 46.

== Candidates ==
Incumbents are denoted with an asterisk (*), successful candidates are bolded.

=== Kumangka Warrarna Wangkanthi (Central) candidates ===
Party	Candidate	Background
Independent	**Clinton Bennell**	Noongar and Wiradjuri man.
Independent	**Melissa Clarke**	
Independent	Adam-Troy Francis	
Independent	**Kahlia Gibson**	Kokatha and Barkandji woman. Current member of the State Aboriginal Heritage Committee.
Independent	**Matthew Karpany-Carter**	Ngarrindjeri man.
Independent	**Matthew Rankine**	Ngarrindjeri, Kokatha, and Narungga man.
Independent	Michael (Mike) Gilby	
Independent	Jarrod Akselsen	Youth worker.
Independent	**Timothy Ritchie**	
Independent Greens	**Moogy Sumner***	Ngarrindjeri and Kaurna man. Unendorsed Greens member.
Independent	**Jennifer Caruso**	
Independent	**Marnie O'Meara***	Elected at 2025 supplementary election.
Independent	**Ashum Owen**	Kaurna, Ngarrindjeri, and Narungga woman.
Independent	**Deb Moyle***	Ngarrindjeri woman.

=== Far North candidates ===
Party	Candidate	Background
Independent	**Angela Watson**	
Independent	**Jonathan Lyons***	
Independent	**Alan M Wilson**	
Independent	**Christopher Dodd***	
Independent	**Mark Campbell***	Pitjantjatjara man. Member of the State Voice.
Independent	**Melissa Thompson***	Pitjantjatjara woman. Member of the State Voice.
Independent	Dharma Ducasse-Singer*	Pitjantjatjara Yankunytjatjara woman.
Independent	Renita Roberts	Basket weaver.
Independent	**Dawn Brown***	
Independent	Anna Strzelecki	Indigenous Student Support Officer.
Independent	Russel Bryant	

=== Flinders and Upper North candidates ===
Party	Candidate	Background
Independent	**TJ Thomas***	Kokatha Yankunytjatjara man. Safety and wellbeing officer.
Independent	**Charmaine Hull**	
Independent	Jacinda Amos	
Independent	**Noeleen Lester**	
Independent	**Ralph Coulthard***	Adnyamathanha and Yankunytjatjara man. Financial counsellor and member of the Stolen Generations Committee.
Independent	Andrew Starkey	
Independent	**Charlotte Coulthard-Dare**	
Independent	**Jacinta McKenzie**	
Independent	**Rob Singleton***	Member of the State Voice.
Independent	Shania Richards	
Independent	Elaine Kite	

=== Murraylands, Riverland and South East candidates ===
Party	Candidate	Background
Independent	**Lisa Rigney***	Ngarrindjeri, Talkindjeri, Ramindjeri, Kaurna, and Boandik woman.
Independent	Thomas Lovett	
Independent	**Stephanie Russel**	
Independent	**Danni Smith***	Eastern Arrernte, Guringdji, Kaurna, Narungga Nukunu and Ngarrindjeri woman. Member of the State Voice.
Independent	**Rob Wright***	Ngarrindjeri man. Member of the State Voice.
Independent	**Timothy Hartman***	Ngarrindjeri man. Director of the Ngarrindjeri Aboriginal Corporation.
Independent	Dan Mitchell-Mathews*	Narungga Kaurna man.
Independent	Jazmin Bingham	Gomeroi woman. First Nations, youth, and climate activist.
Independent	Sarah Booth	Wombaya Warumungu woman.
Independent	Alanna Lawson	
Independent	**Sheryl Giles***	Ngangruku and Ngintait woman.
Independent	**Malcolm Aston**	Ngarrindjeri man.

=== West and West Coast candidates ===
Party	Candidate	Background
Independent	**Jack Johncock***	Wirangu man. Former councillor on Aboriginal and Torres Strait Islander Commission.
Independent	**Patrick Sharpe**	Kokatha person.
Independent	Keenan Smith*	Wirangu, Mirning and Kokatha person. Chairperson of the Wirangu Aboriginal Corporation.
Independent	**Leeroy Binley***	Marlinyu Ghoorlie, Wirangu, Kokatha, Mirning, Noongar and Barngala person. Member of the State Voice.
Independent	**Warren Patrick Rajack Clements**	
Candidates elected unopposed
Independent	**Lorraine Haseldine***	Member of the State Voice.
Independent	**Rebecca Miller***	
Independent	**Evelyn Walker (Richards/Agius)**	

=== Yorke and Mid North candidates ===
Party	Candidate	Background
Independent	Rex Angie	
Independent	**Michael Wanganeen**	
Independent	**Edward D Newchurch***	Narungga man. SA Aboriginal Lands Trust board member and the Point Pearce Aboriginal Council chairperson.
Independent	**Doug Milera***	Narungga man. Narungga Nation Aboriginal Corporation CEO.
Independent	**Quentin Agius***	Descendant of the Adjahdura (Narungga) and Nadjuri people. Member of the State Voice.
Candidates elected unopposed
Independent	**Billie-Jane Braund**	
Independent	**Joy Makepeace***	Kamilaroi Murrawarri woman and member of the Stolen Generations.
Independent	**Kellie Sansbury**	

== Results ==
=== Kumangka Warrarna Wangkanthi (Central) ===
2026 South Australian First Nations Voice election: Kumangka Warrarna Wangkanthi (Central)
Party	Candidate	Votes	%	±%
Quota		138		
Independent Greens	Moogy Sumner (re-elected)	550	33.4	+17.6
Independent	Ashum Owen (elected)	173	10.5	+10.5
Independent	Deb Moyle (re-elected)	161	9.8	+4.0
Independent	Kahlia Gibson (elected)	152	9.2	+9.2
Independent	Matthew Rankine (elected)	122	7.4	+7.4
Independent	Jennifer Caruso (elected)	110	6.7	+3.1
Independent	Melissa Clarke (elected)	99	6.0	+6.0
Independent	Marnie O'Meara (re-elected) (Note: Marnie O'Meara was first elected at a 2025 supplementary election)	86	5.2	+1.4
Independent	Matthew Karpany-Carter (elected)	63	3.8	+3.8
Independent	Clinton Bennell (elected)	44	2.7	+2.7
Independent	Timothy Ritchie (elected)	44	2.7	+2.7
Independent	Adam-Troy Francis	17	1.0	+1.0
Independent	Jarrod Akselsen	15	0.9	+0.9
Independent	Michael (Mike) Gilby	12	0.7	+0.7
Total formal votes		1648	98.6	−0.1
Informal votes		24	1.4	+0.1
Turnout		1672		

=== Far North ===
2026 South Australian First Nations Voice election: Far North
Party	Candidate	Votes	%	±%
Quota		29		
Independent	Melissa Thompson (re-elected)	58	25.3	+8.1
Independent	Mark Campbell (re-elected)	39	17.0	−6.2
Independent	Christopher Dodd (re-elected)	32	14.0	−3.3
Independent	Jonathan Lyons (re-elected)	23	10.0	−6.2
Independent	Angela Watson (elected)	23	10.0	+10.0
Independent	Alan M. Wilson (elected)	15	6.6	+6.6
Independent	Dawn Brown (re-elected)	15	6.6	+2.9
Independent	Russel Bryant	9	3.9	+3.9
Independent	Dharma Ducasse-Singer	7	3.1	−5.6
Independent	Renita Roberts	5	2.2	+2.2
Independent	Anna Strzlecki	3	1.3	+1.3
Total formal votes		229	95.8	−2.9
Informal votes		10	4.2	+2.9
Turnout		239		

=== Flinders and Upper North ===
2026 South Australian First Nations Voice election: Flinders and Upper North
Party	Candidate	Votes	%	±%
Quota		67		
Independent	Jacinta McKenzie (elected)	92	17.4	+17.4
Independent	Ralph Coulthard (re-elected)	88	16.7	+7.4
Independent	Rob Singleton (re-elected)	73	13.8	+3.2
Independent	Charmaine Hull (elected)	57	10.8	+10.8
Independent	TJ Thomas (re-elected)	44	8.3	+1.2
Independent	Noeleen Lester (elected)	43	8.1	+8.1
Independent	Jacinda Amos	39	7.4	+7.4
Independent	Charlotte Coulthard-Dare (elected)	35	6.6	+6.6
Independent	Elaine Kite	28	5.3	+5.3
Independent	Andrew Starkey	24	4.5	+4.5
Independent	Shania Richards	5	0.9	+0.9
Total formal votes		528	97.8	−1.7
Informal votes		12	2.2	+1.7
Turnout		540		

=== Murraylands, Riverland and South East ===
2026 South Australian First Nations Voice election: Riverland and South East
Party	Candidate	Votes	%	±%
Quota		49		
Independent	Lisa Rigney (re-elected)	71	18.2	+12.2
Independent	Danni Smith (re-elected)	63	16.1	−8.1
Independent	Sheryl Giles (re-elected)	53	13.6	+2.0
Independent	Timothy Hartman (re-elected)	38	9.7	+0.6
Independent	Malcolm Aston (elected)	31	7.9	+7.9
Independent	Rob Wright (re-elected)	29	7.4	−2.4
Independent	Jazmin Bingham	26	6.7	+6.7
Independent	Stephanie Russell (elected)	23	5.9	+5.9
Independent	Dan Mitchell-Mathews	17	4.4	+1.2
Independent	Sarah Booth	16	4.1	+4.1
Independent	Alanna Lawson	15	3.8	+3.8
Independent	Thomas Lovett	8	2.1	+2.1
Total formal votes		390	98.0	−0.6
Informal votes		8	2.0	+0.6
Turnout		398		

=== West and West Coast ===
2026 South Australian First Nations Voice election: West and West Coast
Party	Candidate	Votes	%	±%
Quota		60		
Independent	Jack Johncock (re-elected)	89	30.1	+7.9
Independent	Leeroy Bilney (re-elected)	85	28.7	+18.7
Independent	Patrick Sharpe (elected)	52	17.6	+17.6
Independent	Warren Patrick Rajack Clements (elected)	41	13.9	+13.9
Independent	Keenan Smith	29	9.8	+5.1
Total formal votes		296	99.7	+1.9
Informal votes		1	0.3	−1.9
Turnout		297		

=== Yorke and Mid-North ===
2026 South Australian First Nations Voice election: Yorke and Mid-North
Party	Candidate	Votes	%	±%
Quota		44		
Independent	Michael Wanganeen (elected)	56	25.8	+25.8
Independent	Doug Milera (re-elected)	48	22.1	+6.6
Independent	Quentin Agius (re-elected)	47	21.7	+9.3
Independent	Edward D Newchurch (re-elected)	45	20.7	+12.2
Independent	Rex Angie	21	9.7	+1.2
Total formal votes		217	98.2	+0.5
Informal votes		4	1.8	−0.5
Turnout		221		
