= Vermillion Accord on Human Remains =

1989 statement of archaeological ethics

The Vermilllion Accord on Human Remains (also Vermillion Accord) is a 1989 international archaeological ethics agreement calling for the respectful treatment of human remains.

== History ==
The accord was adopted at the 1989 meeting of the World Archaeological Congress in Vermillion, South Dakota. It was a response to concerns raised by indigenous peoples about the circumstances surrounding the collection and preservation of human remains. In particular, it addressed concerns that many remains were collected in the context of clashes with settlers and colonizing authorities, and that their display failed to address the customs and interests of the communities they represent.

== Content ==
The accord calls for archaeological work to be based on six principles addressing:

- respect for mortal remains
- respect for the wishes of people who have died, where these can be known or reasonably inferred
- respect for the views of local communities, relatives, and/or guardians
- respect for the scientific value of human remains
- promotion of negotiated agreements on disposition of human remains
- recognition of the concerns of ethnic groups

== Legacy ==
The accord has provoked widespread reconsideration of the ethics of collecting, displaying, and working with human remains. It was incorporated into the Tamaki Makau-rau Accord which sets standards for the display of human remains and other culturally sensitive objects. These accords prompted many museums to review their policies with respect to such holdings. For example, in 1991 the Council of Australian Museum Directors adopted new policies regarding the remains of Aboriginal and Torres Strait Islander peoples. It has also led researchers to explore other methods of examining remains, such as the use of CT scans.

Just a month after its adoption, the United States Congress passed the National Museum of the American Indian Act which called for the Smithsonian Institution to inventory and work with tribes to arrange repatriation of its extensive holdings of Native American remains. It was also influential in the passage of the Native American Graves Protection and Repatriation Act a year later.

In the United Kingdom, the accord informed the activities of the Working Group on Human Remains in Museum Collections, which received its mandate in 2001 and reported its findings in November 2003.

Archaeologist and academic Sarah Tarlow has criticized the Vermillion Accord and other ethical codes, suggesting that they ignore the complexity of the ethical dilemmas archaeologists face and tend to preempt debate. She advocates a case-by-case approach instead.
