= Heritage for Peace =

- Formation: February 2013; 12 years ago
- President: Isber Sabrine
- Website: https://www.heritageforpeace.org/

Heritage for Peace (H4P) is a Spanish NGO. Its objective is to help preserve cultural heritage during wartime. Its activities have included documenting and guarding heritage sites, preparing museum evacuations and supporting local archeologists. H4P was founded in 2013 at the seventh meeting of the World Archaeological Congress.

Conflicts in which Heritage for Peace has been active include:

- Russian invasion of Ukraine
- Syrian civil war
- Sudanese civil war
- Gaza war
