= Indigenous archaeology =

Sub-discipline of western archaeological theory

Indigenous archaeologies is a sub-discipline of archaeological practice that centers archaeology "by, for, and with" Indigenous people to critique the colonialist biases in modern archaeology. It actively recognizes the special rights, interests and responsibilities that Native people have in the realm of cultural heritage. Changes in practices under what is called indigenous archaeology may range from Indigenous peoples being consulted about archaeological research and the terms of non-Native researchers, to instances of Native-designed and directed exploration of their "own" heritage. Indigenous archaeology is not exclusive to Indigenous peoples. The practice of Indigenous archaeology provides non-Native people with a tool by which they may aid in the larger project of decolonization and reclamation of minority rights and identities.

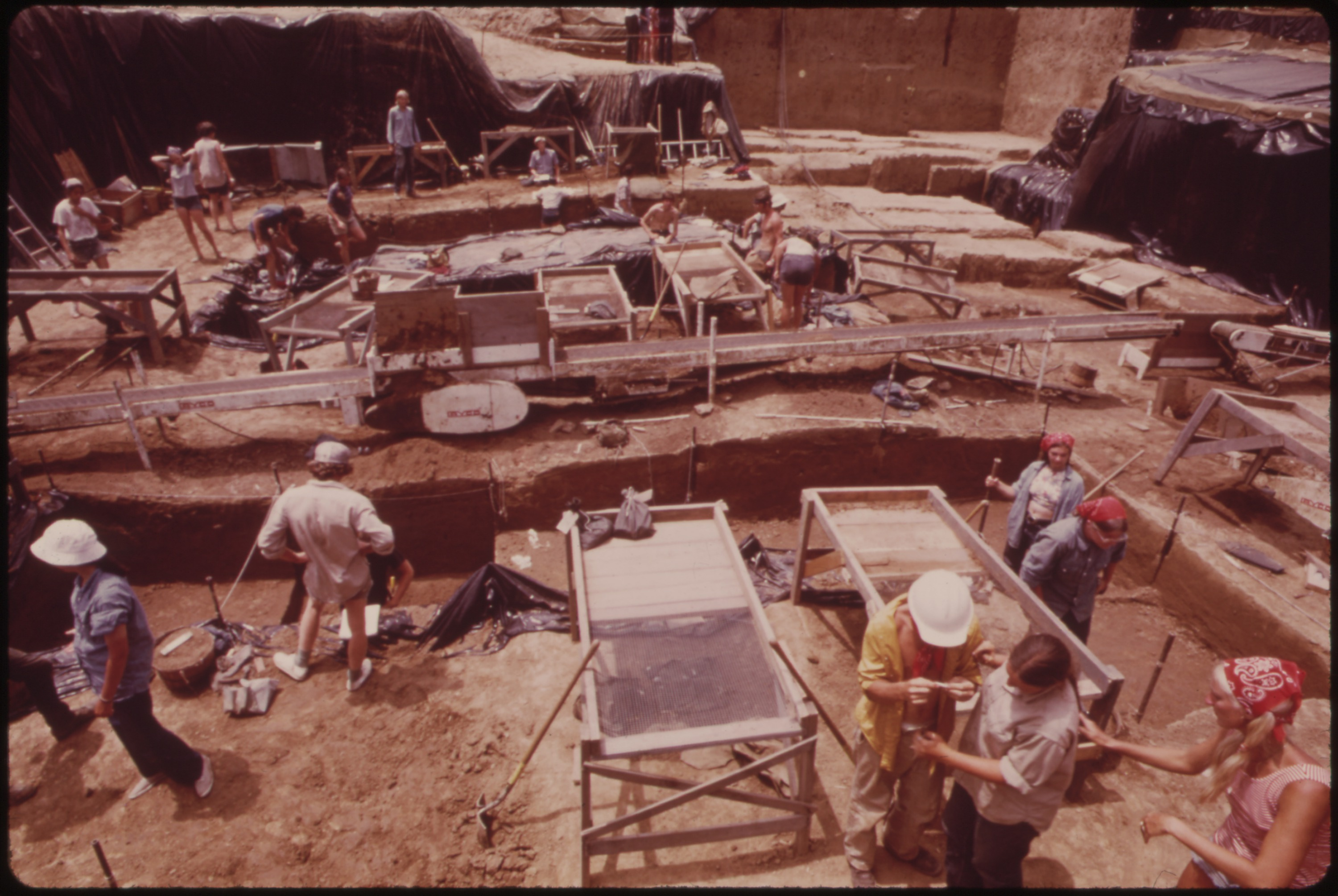
College students work with indigenous peoples at an archaeological dig in East Saint Louis.

There is no singular paradigm which all practitioners follow, leading to the pluralization of the name. Methodologies can include, but are not limited to; the use of intangible heritage in interpreting the material archaeological record, protective data sovereignty and Indigenous intellectual property rights, and community-led collaborative project frameworks.

== Background ==
Archaeology has its origins in European colonial policies and replicated extractive practices through the collection of material culture, including human remains. While some items were legitimately purchased, many were excavated from graves without the consultation or permission of the Indigenous community to whom they belonged. From the 18th to 20th century, these remains were then transferred into museum or university collections where they were studied by European and American scientists as evidence in the creation of racial classification systems.

Until the latter 20th century, Indigenous communities lacked the legal standing to challenge these institutions. The rise of global anti-colonial movements of the 1970s and 1980s led by Aboriginal and Indigenous people in settler-colonial nations led to the passage of legislation that would prevent further harm and establish legal rights concerning material culture. In the United States, Congress passed the Native American Graves Protection and Repatriation Act (NAGPRA) in 1990 and amended in 2025, which requires federal agencies and institutions that receive federal funding to return Native American "cultural items" to lineal descendants and culturally affiliated American Indian tribes, Alaska Native villages, and Native Hawaiian organizations. Alberta is the only Canadian province with specific laws relating to repatriation with First Nations Sacred Ceremonial Objects Repatriation Act being updated in 2016. Provincial governments have recognised that local First Nations had an interest in the archaeological permit application process. Australia has no laws directly governing repatriation, but there is a government programme relating to the return of Aboriginal remains and artefacts, the International Repatriation Program (IRP), administered by the Department of Communications and the Arts. The United Nations Declaration on the Rights of Indigenous Peoples (UNDRIP or DOTROIP), which is a legal non-binding resolution that suggests countries return ceremonial objects (article 12) and human remains (article 12), was not accepted by the US, Canada, Australia, and New Zealand.

== Core Critiques of Western Archaeology ==
The rising number of Indigenous voices in higher education has led to critiques of the role mainstream archaeology has played in objectifying, appropriating, and erasing Native people from national histories. Other critiques point to the dismissal of Indigenous knowledge in interpreting the cultural record, leading to the imperialist-aligned nationalist interpretation of history being codified in the academics and archaeological practice. The basis of archaeology in western science leads to the valuation of empirical data over immaterial sources. Indigenous archaeology sees this approach as biasing the historical narrative because excludes cultures with non-material methods of preserving history and intangible heritage. In recent years, scholars have begun to critique how archaeological findings are accessed by non-Indigenous publics and the who should be allowed access to culturally sensitive material. However, Indigenous communities dispute on whether or not their cultural practices should be subject to academic and legalistic judgement by external scholars. The demands on indigenous peoples concerning archaeological collaboration involve more burdens on the indigenous community to answer to archaeological probing, while traditional archaeological approaches do not change and fail to accommodate to indigenous needs.

== Applications ==
=== CRM ===
The necessity of development-related cultural resources management (CRM) archaeology has prompted archaeologists to work more closely with Indigenous communities. However, while consultation is often legally required to proceed with projects, this does not necessarily mean that the community’s requests are followed or that they are given access to any findings. This has led to an insistence on “Collaboration Over Consultation.” Indigenous communities have voiced great interest in participating in archaeology that concerns their own history and in developing their own CRM organizations to protect their heritage. One example of an Indigenous owned and operated CRM firm is BRIC, which is a subsidiary of the Diné Development Corporation, and wholly owned by the Navajo Nation.

=== Self-Determination and Land Rights ===
Beyond field-based applications, Indigenous archaeologies empower Indigenous peoples as they work toward decolonization by providing direct connection to ancestral presences and control of their own heritage. In some cases archaeological sites provide affirming evidence of uninterrupted occupation of colonized lands. In Australia, such archaeological projects serve as evidence to negotiate land claims.

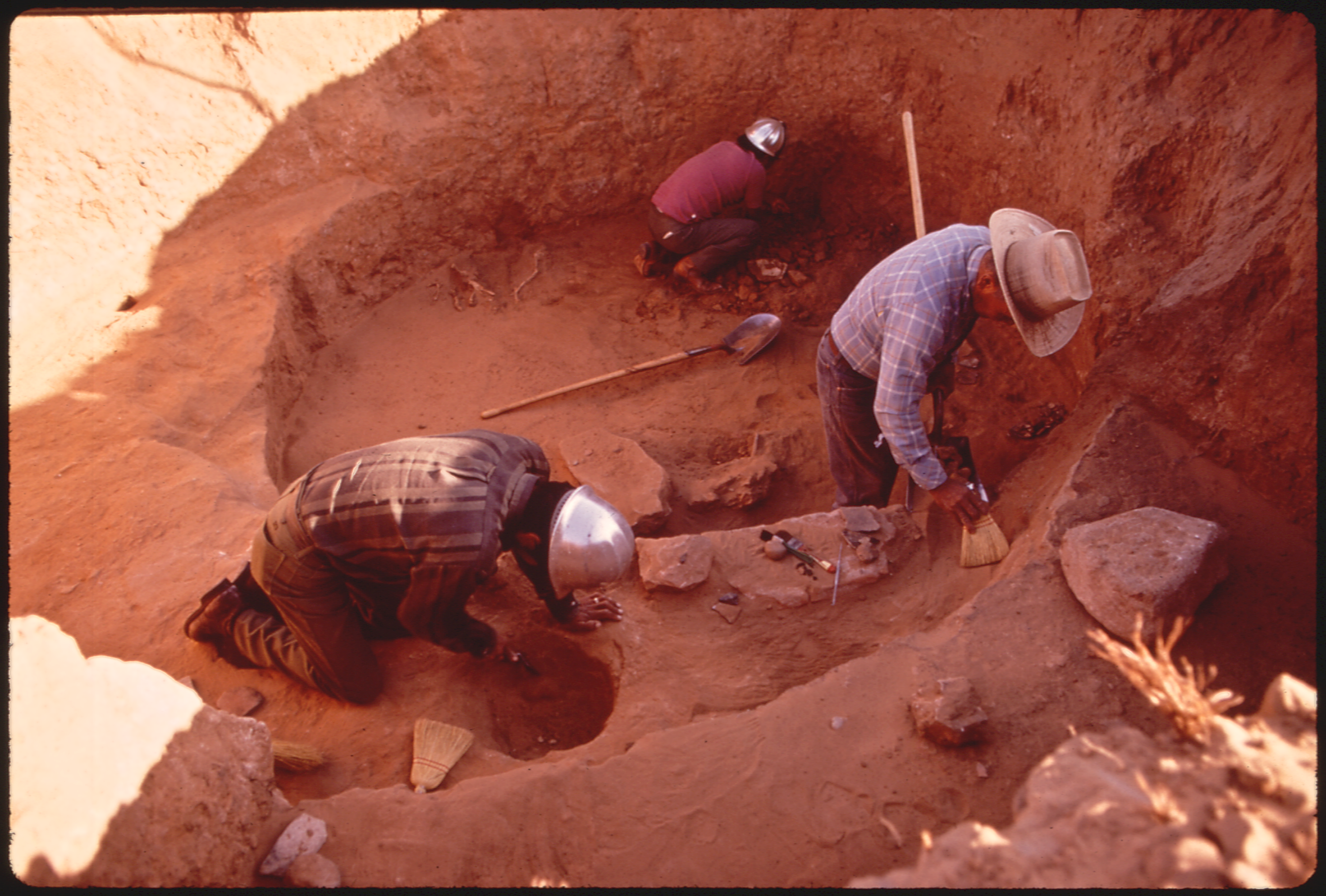
Navajo workers excavate an archaeological dig.

=== Repatriation ===
Indigenous archaeologies are beneficial in addressing the repatriation of Indigenous remains and objects of cultural patrimony to descendant relations and the stewardship of heritage sites. The demand for repatriation has generated considerable controversy among scholars, some of whom support the concept in principle, but believe that incorporation of certain practices has led to "major constraints on the research" of historical communities. Though this has been refuted by the leading voices of Indigenous archaeologies. Because the practices of Indigenous archaeologies are determined by the concerned community, proponents of the field are able to respectfully attend to how remains should be handled as descendants process the associated historical traumas.

== See also ==
- African diaspora archaeology
- Cultural Heritage
- Intellectual property issues in cultural heritage (IPinCH)
- Repatriation
- List of Native American Academics
