= World Archaeological Congress =

- Abbreviation: WAC
- Predecessor: 1986
- Presidents: Koji Mizoguchi
- Website: worldarchaeologicalcongress.com

The World Archaeological Congress (WAC) is a non-governmental, not-for-profit organization which promotes world archaeology. It is the only global archaeological organisation with elected representation.

Established in 1986, WAC holds an international Congress every four years to promote the exchange of results from archaeological research; professional training and public education for disadvantaged nations, groups and communities; the empowerment and betterment of Indigenous groups and First Nations peoples; and the conservation of archaeological sites.

== History ==
The World Archaeological Congress was established in 1986, after a controversy concerning the planned attendance of South African and Namibian scholars at the 11th Congress of the International Union of Prehistoric and Protohistoric Sciences in Southampton, United Kingdom. In the run-up to the congress, Southampton City Council and other organizations funding the meeting demanded that scholars from South Africa and Namibia were banned from participation in view of Apartheid in South Africa. The British organizers complied with this demand, but the Executive Committee of UISPP ultimately ruled that it was against the organization's constitution to exclude any international bona fide scholars, and withdrew its endorsement of the conference. The National Secretary of the Congress, Peter Ucko, moved forward with the meeting under a new name, the World Archaeological Congress. The resulting meeting drew in 1000 people from 100 countries, with the special attempt to include people from new nations and minority groups to participate in the congress. Since that time, WAC has "constituted itself as a uniquely representative non-profit organization of worldwide archaeology that recognizes the historical and social role, and the political context, of archaeology, and the need to make archaeological studies relevant to the wider community. It especially seeks to debate and refute institutionalized views that serve the interests of a privileged few to the detriment of disenfranchised others. WAC explicitly values diversity against institutionalized mechanisms that marginalize the cultural heritage of indigenous peoples, minorities and the poor".

== Congresses ==
World Archaeological Congresses are held every four years, with several Inter-Congresses between the main congresses. The congresses vary in their seasonality, but present the opportunity to present research, participate in panels, and socialize with other members. Congresses have been held on six continents and attract large, multinational attendance. The locations of the congresses are chosen to encourage inclusivity within the means of people from around the world. Locating congresses outside of 'First World' venues has led to political and social complications for WAC. For example, WAC-3 in India was besieged by media coverage after the then president of the international executive committee J. Golson banned discussion of the demolition of the Babri Masjid during the conference.

Patrons for past Congresses have included Prince Charles (WAC-1), Nelson Mandela (WAC-4), Harriet Fulbright (WAC-5), and Abdullah II of Jordan (WAC-7)

Meeting	Location	Date	Patron
1st	Southampton, United Kingdom	September 1–6, 1986	Prince Charles
2nd	Barquisimeto, Venezuela	September 4–8, 1990	
3rd	New Delhi, India	December 4–11, 1994	
4th	Cape Town, South Africa	January 10–14, 1999	Nelson Mandela
5th	Washington, D.C., United States	June 21–26, 2003	Harriet Fulbright
6th	Dublin, Ireland	June 29–July 4, 2008	Mary McAleese
7th	Dead Sea, Jordan	January 14–18, 2013	Abdullah II of Jordan
8th	Kyoto, Japan	August 28–September 2, 2016	
9th	Prague, Czech Republic	Originally scheduled for July 5–10, 2020; rescheduled to July 3–8, 2022 due to the coronavirus pandemic.	Eva Zažímalová
10th	Darwin, Australia	June 22–27, 2025	

== Inter-Congresses ==
The World Archaeological Congress holds Inter-Congresses which are regionally and thematically organized. Locations include Vermillion, United States, Mombasa, Kenya, Brač, Croatia, Catamarca, Argentina, Kingston, Jamaica, Osaka, Japan, Newcastle upon Tyne, United Kingdom, Łódź, Poland, Olavarría, Argentina, New Zealand, Curaçao, Vienna, Austria, Ramallah, Palestine and Indianapolis, United States.

== Publications ==
Selected papers from these conferences are published in the One World Archaeology Series. In mid-2012 there were 58 books in this series. WAC also publishes Archaeologies, the Journal of the World Archaeological Congress. A full list] of the book series and journals that WAC publishes is available.

== Protocols ==
The World Archaeological Congress has produced ground-breaking codes for the conduct of archaeologists. These include the Vermillion Accord on Human Remains which calls for respect for the dead and descendent communities and the Tamaki Makau-rau Accord on the Display of Human Remains and Sacred Objects which requires permission from community members before displaying human remains and artifacts.

== Global Libraries Program ==
The Global Libraries Program aims to develop the archaeological literary collections of economically-disadvantaged institutions. By supporting such libraries, we hope to assist archaeological and cultural heritage management students and professionals to undertake and excel at their study and work.

== WAC Presidents ==
Michael Day (1986–1990), Jack Golson (1990–1994), Bassey Wai Andah (1994–1997), Gilbert Pwiti (acting 1998–1999), Martin Hall (1999–2003), Claire Smith (2003–2013), Koji Mizoguchi (2013–present)

== See also ==
- Heritage for Peace
