= Archaeology =

Study of human activity based on materials left behind

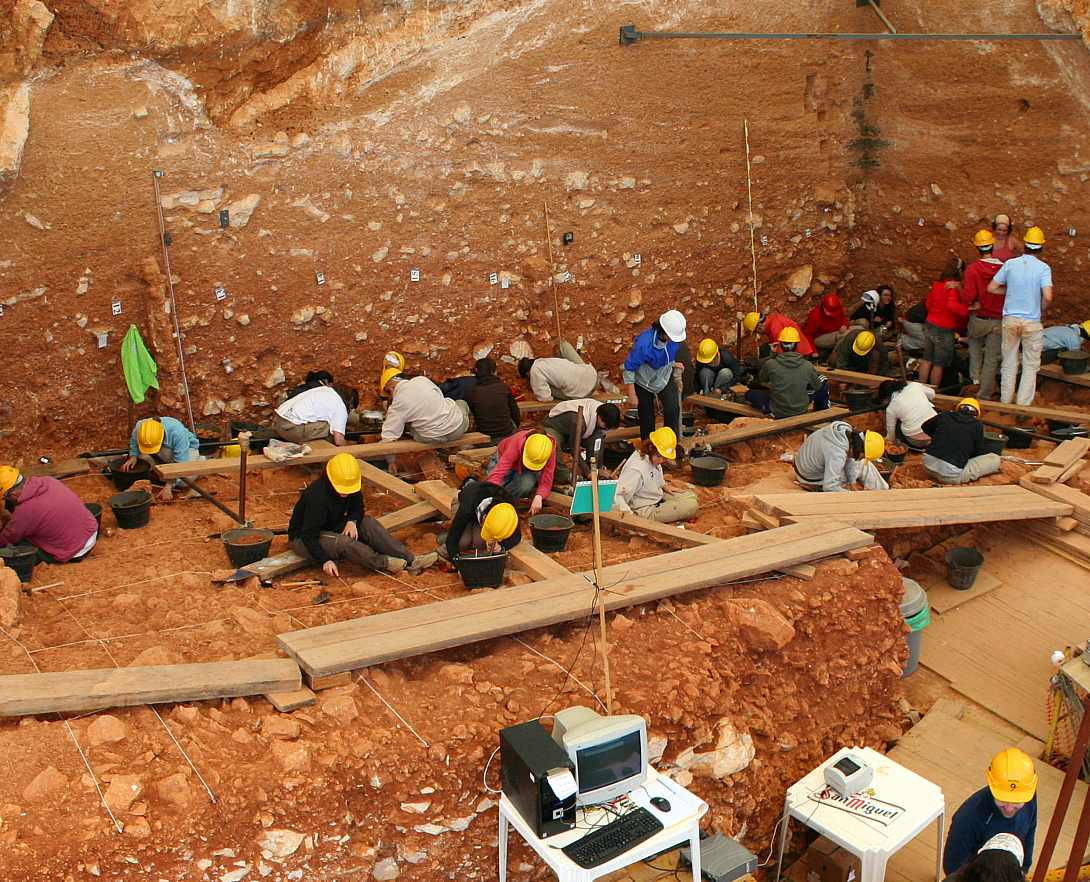
Excavations at Atapuerca, an archaeological site in Spain

Archaeology or archeology (Note: from Ancient Greek ἀρχαῖος (archaios) 'ancient' and λογία (logia) 'study of'. Although American English usually does not use -ae spellings, archaeology is the standard spelling across the English-speaking world, including the United States. Some US government bodies and university presses use archeology in accordance with the GPO Style Manual. Another uncommon variant is archæology, using the archaic ligature æ.) is the study of human activity through the recovery and analysis of material culture. The archaeological record consists of artifacts, architecture, biofacts or ecofacts, sites, and cultural landscapes. Archaeology can be considered both a social science and a branch of the humanities. It is usually considered a rigorous specialized sub academic discipline of anthropology (in North America – the four-field approach), but may also be classified as part history or geography. The discipline involves surveying, excavation, and eventually analysis of data collected, to learn more about the past. In broad scope, archaeology relies on cross-disciplinary research.

Archaeologists study human prehistory and history, from the development of the first stone tools at Lomekwi in East Africa 3.3 million years ago up until recent decades. Archaeology is distinct from palaeontology, which is the study of fossil remains. Archaeology is particularly important for learning about prehistoric societies, for which, by definition, there are no written records. Prehistory includes over 99% of the human past, from the Paleolithic until the advent of literacy in societies around the world. Archaeology has various goals, ranging from understanding culture history to reconstructing past lifeways to documenting and explaining changes in human societies over time. Derived from Greek, the term archaeology means "the study of ancient history".

Archaeology developed out of antiquarianism in Europe during the 19th century and has since become a discipline practiced worldwide. Nation-states have used archaeology to create particular visions of the past. Since its early development, various specific sub-disciplines of archaeology have developed, including maritime archaeology, feminist archaeology, and archaeoastronomy, and numerous different scientific techniques have been developed to aid archaeological investigation. Nonetheless, today, archaeologists face many problems, such as dealing with pseudoarchaeology, the looting of artifacts, a lack of public interest, and opposition to the excavation of human remains.

== History ==
=== First instances of archaeology ===
Excavations of Nabonidus (c. 550 BC)

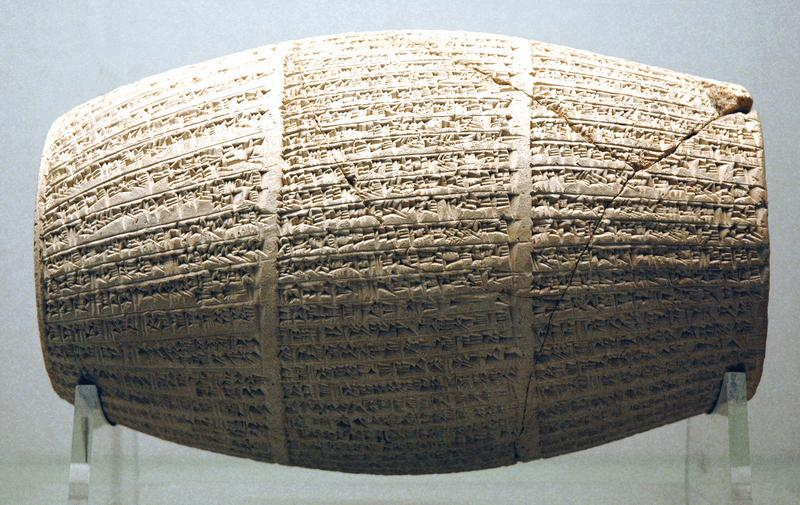
Nabonidus cylinder from Sippar

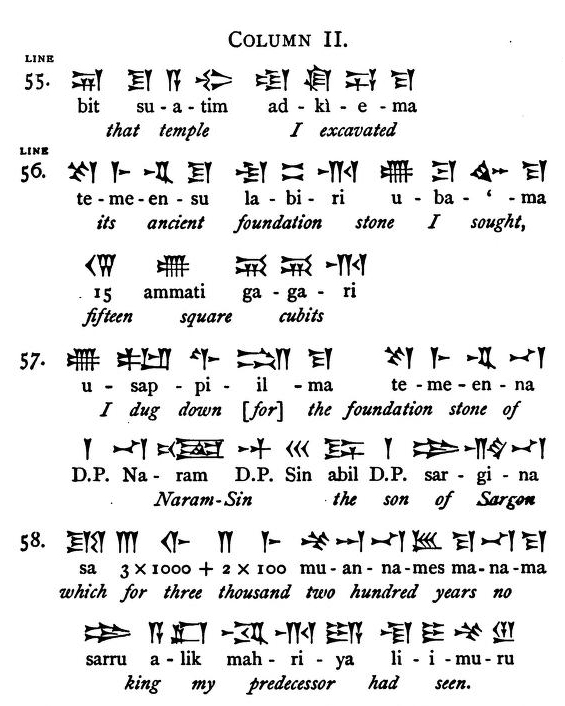
Extract describing the excavation

Cuneiform account of the excavation of a foundation deposit belonging to Naram-Sin of Akkad (ruled c. 2200 BC), by king Nabonidus (ruled c. 550 BC).

In Ancient Mesopotamia, a foundation deposits the Akkadian Empire ruler Naram-Sin (ruled c. 2200 BC) was discovered and analysed by King Nabonidus, c. 550 BC, who is thus known as the first archaeologist. Not only did he lead the first excavations which were to find the foundation deposits of the temples of Šamaš the sun god, the warrior goddess Anunitu (both located in Sippar), and the sanctuary that Naram-Sin built to the moon god, located in Harran, but he also had them restored to their former glory. He was also the first to date an archaeological artifact in his attempt to date Naram-Sin's temple during his search for it. Even though his estimate was inaccurate by about 1,500 years, it was still a very good one considering the lack of accurate dating technology at the time.

=== Antiquarians ===
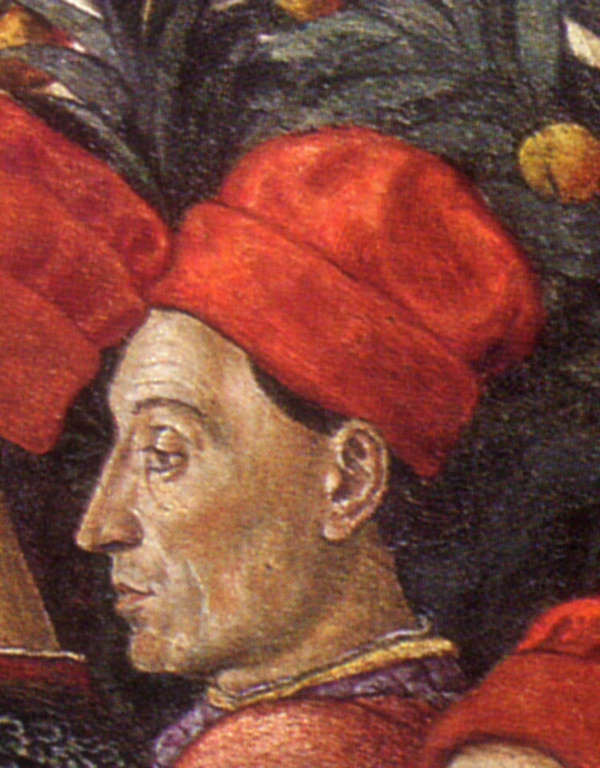
Cyriacus of Ancona (fresco by Benozzo Gozzoli)

The science of archaeology (from Greek ἀρχαιολογία archaiologia, from ἀρχαῖος, arkhaios 'ancient' and -λογία, -logia 'study') grew out of the older multi-disciplinary study known as antiquarianism. Antiquarians studied history with particular attention to ancient artifacts, manuscripts, and historical sites. Antiquarianism focused on the empirical evidence available for understanding the past, encapsulated in the motto of the 18th century antiquary Richard Colt Hoare: "We speak from facts, not theory". Tentative steps towards the systematization of archaeology as a science took place during the Enlightenment period in Europe in the 17th and 18th centuries.

In Imperial China during the Song dynasty (960–1279), figures such as Ouyang Xiu and Zhao Mingcheng established the tradition of Chinese epigraphy by investigating, preserving, and analyzing ancient Chinese bronze inscriptions from the Shang and Zhou periods. In his book published in 1088, Shen Kuo criticized contemporary Chinese scholars for attributing ancient bronze vessels as creations of famous sages rather than artisan commoners, and for attempting to revive them for ritual use without discerning their original functionality and purpose of manufacture. Such antiquarian pursuits waned after the Song period, were revived in the 17th century during the Qing dynasty, but were always considered a branch of Chinese historiography rather than a separate discipline of archaeology.

In Renaissance Europe, philosophical interest in the remains of Greco-Roman civilization and the rediscovery of classical culture began in the late Middle Ages, with humanism.

Cyriacus of Ancona was a restlessly itinerant Italian humanist and antiquarian who came from a prominent family of merchants in Ancona, a maritime republic on the Adriatic. He was called by his contemporaries pater antiquitatis ('father of antiquity') and today "father of classical archaeology": "Cyriac of Ancona was the most enterprising and prolific recorder of Greek and Roman antiquities, particularly inscriptions, in the fifteenth century, and the general accuracy of his records entitles him to be called the founding father of modern classical archeology." He travelled throughout Greece and all around the Eastern Mediterranean, to record his findings on ancient buildings, statues and inscriptions, including archaeological remains still unknown to his time: the Parthenon, Delphi, the Egyptian pyramids, the hieroglyphics. He noted down his archaeological discoveries in his diary, Commentaria (in six volumes).

Flavio Biondo, an Italian Renaissance humanist historian, created a systematic guide to the ruins and topography of ancient Rome in the early 15th century, for which he has been called an early founder of archaeology.

Antiquarians of the 16th century, including John Leland and William Camden, conducted surveys of the English countryside, drawing, describing and interpreting the monuments that they encountered.

The Oxford English Dictionary first cites "archaeologist" in 1824; this soon became the usual term for one major branch of antiquarian activity. "Archaeology", from 1607 onward, initially meant what we would call "ancient history" generally, with the narrower modern sense first seen in 1837. However, it was Jacob Spon who, in 1685, offered one of the earliest definitions of "archaeologia" to describe the study of antiquities in which he was engaged, in the preface of a collection of transcriptions of Roman inscriptions which he had gleaned over the years of his travels, entitled Miscellanea eruditae antiquitatis.

In archeological terminology, such descriptive aspects of early antiquarianism (and later archaeology in general) are also known as archaeography, that encompasses various descriptions of archaeological sites and objects, initially by travelers, traders, diplomats and other non-professionals, who were often in position to view sites and antiquities in a better state of preservation then encountered later by scholars, thus making such early archaeographical accounts (writings, drawings, etc.) very valuable for modern archaeological studies, that are continuing to use and apply various descriptive (archaeographical) practices and tools, integrated into modern archaeological methodology.

Twelfth-century Indian scholar Kalhana's writings involved recording local traditions and examining manuscripts, inscriptions, coins, and architecture, which are described as among the earliest traces of archaeology. One of his notable works is called Rajatarangini, which was completed c. 1150 and is considered one of the first historical works of India.

=== First excavations ===
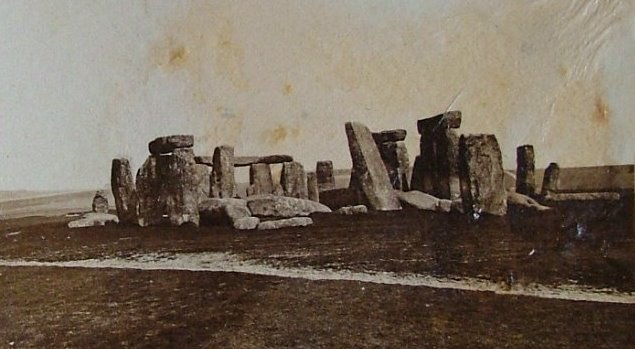
An early photograph of Stonehenge taken July 1877

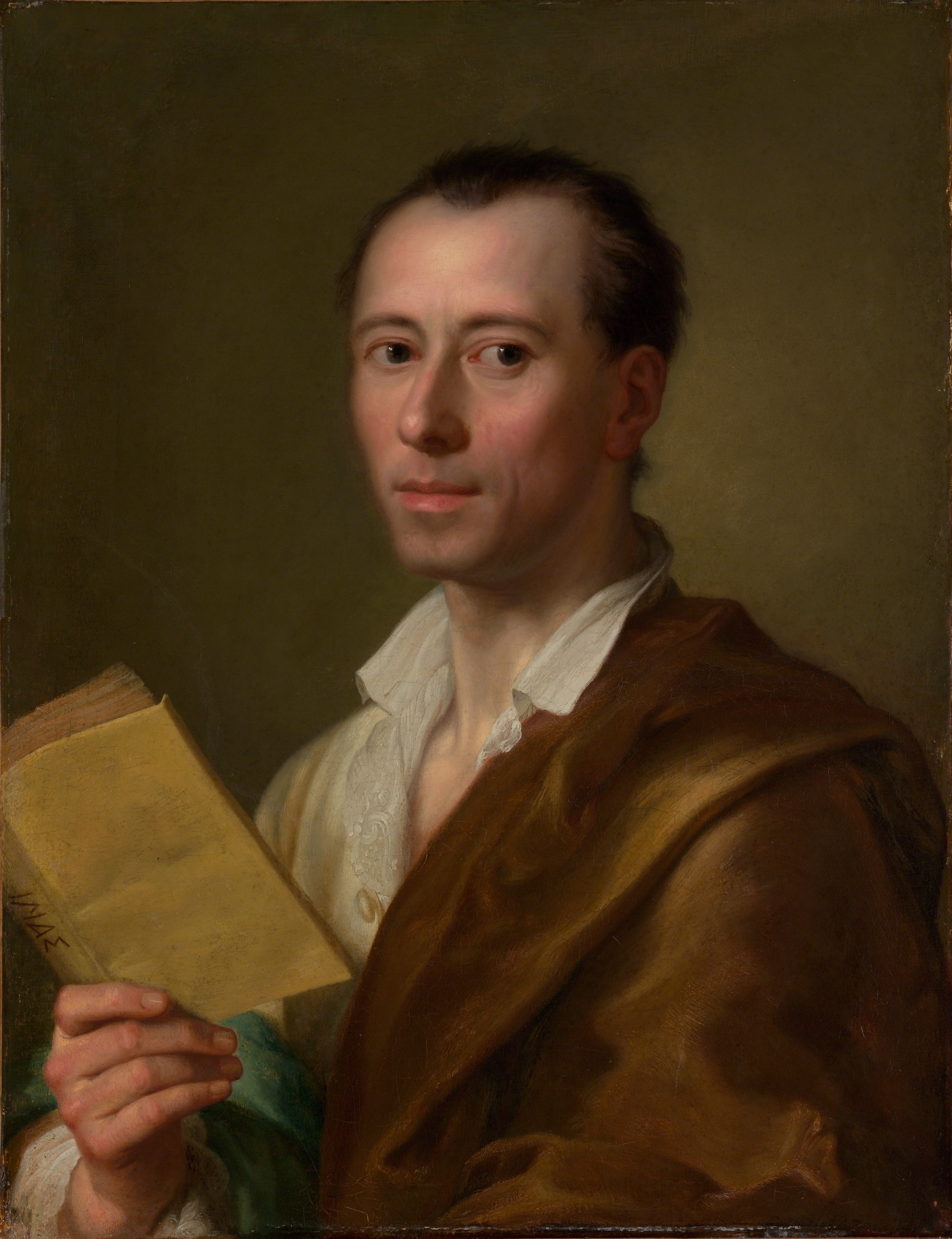
Johann Joachim Winckelmann (Raphael Mengs after 1755)

Among the first sites to undergo archaeological excavation were Stonehenge and other megalithic monuments in England. John Aubrey (1626–1697) was a pioneer archaeologist who recorded numerous megalithic and other field monuments in southern England. He was also ahead of his time in analysing his findings. He attempted to chart the chronological stylistic evolution of handwriting, medieval architecture, costume, and shield-shapes.

Excavations were also carried out by the Spanish military engineer Roque Joaquín de Alcubierre in the ancient towns of Pompeii and Herculaneum, both of which had been covered by ash during the Eruption of Mount Vesuvius in AD 79. These excavations began in 1748 in Pompeii and in 1738 in Herculaneum. The discovery of entire towns, complete with utensils and even human shapes, as well as the unearthing of frescos, had a big impact throughout Europe.

However, before the development of modern techniques, excavations tended to be haphazard; the importance of concepts such as stratification and context was overlooked.

In the mid-18th century, the German Johann Joachim Winckelmann lived in Rome and devoted himself to the study of Roman antiquities, gradually acquiring an unrivalled knowledge of ancient art. Then, he visited the archaeological excavations being conducted at Pompeii and Herculaneum. He was one of the founders of scientific archaeology and first applied the categories of style on a large, systematic basis to the history of art. He was one of the first to separate Greek art into periods and time classifications. Winckelmann has been called both "The prophet and founding hero of modern archaeology" and the father of the discipline of art history.

=== Development of archaeological method ===
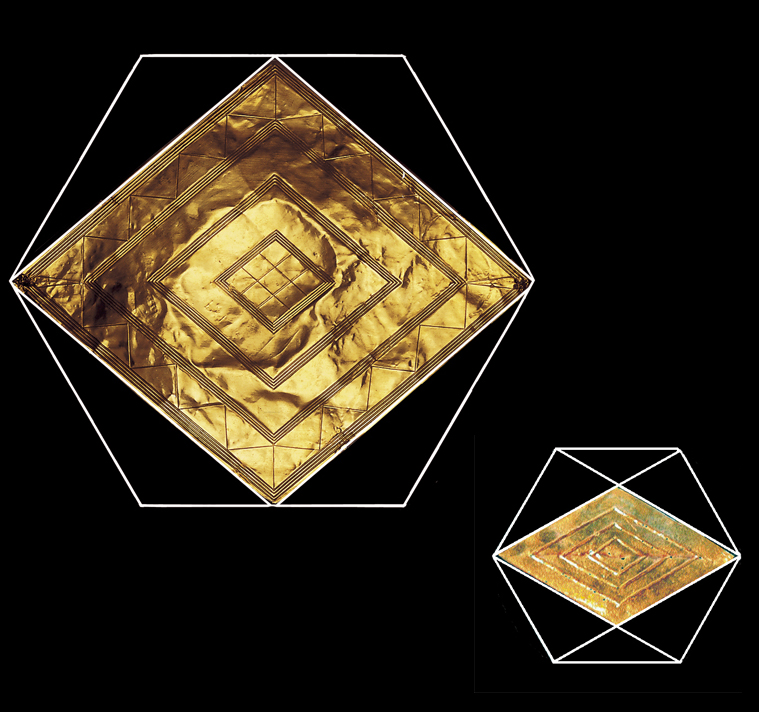
Artifacts discovered at the 1808 Bush Barrow excavation by Sir Richard Colt Hoare and William Cunnington.

The father of archaeological excavation was William Cunnington (1754–1810). He undertook excavations in Wiltshire from around 1798, funded by Sir Richard Colt Hoare. Cunnington made meticulous recordings of Neolithic and Bronze Age barrows, and the terms he used to categorize and describe them are still used by archaeologists today. Future U.S. President Thomas Jefferson also did his own excavations in 1784 using the trench method, on several Native American burial mounds in Virginia. His excavations were prompted by the "Moundbuilders" question; however, his careful methods led him to conclude that there was no reason why the ancestors of the Native Americans of his time could not have raised those mounds.

One of the major achievements of 19th-century archaeology was the development of stratigraphy. The idea of overlapping strata tracing back to successive periods was borrowed from the new geological and palaeontological work of scholars like William Smith, James Hutton, and Charles Lyell. The systematic application of stratigraphy to archaeology first occurred during excavations of prehistorical and Bronze Age sites. In the third and fourth decades of the 19th century, archaeologists such as Jacques Boucher de Perthes and Christian Jürgensen Thomsen began to arrange the artifacts they had found in chronological order.

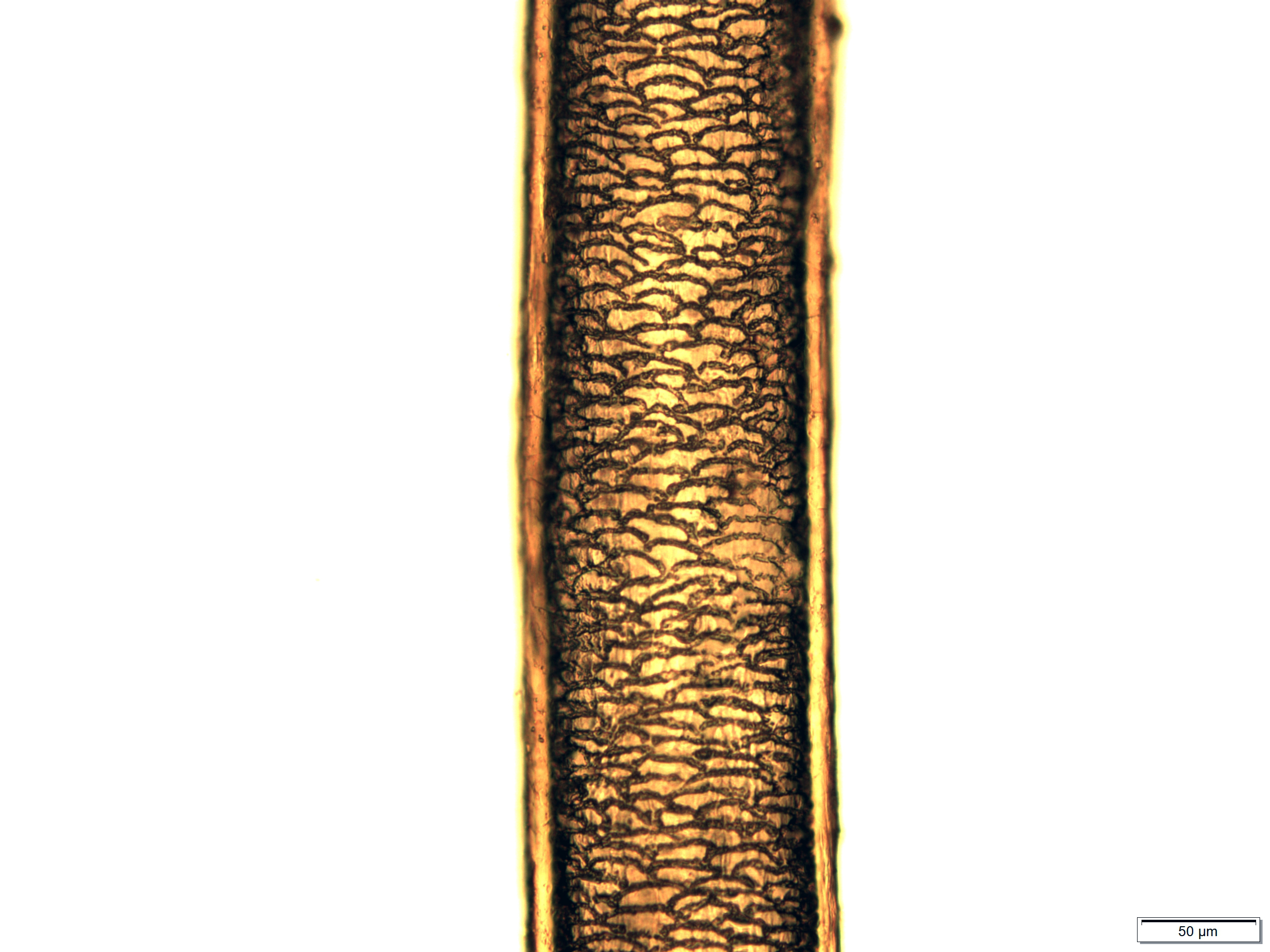
This photo is made of a single goat hair from a textile found on the 14th century ship in Tallinn, Estonia. The photo was done in the archaeology department (University of Tartu) using a microscope Olympus BX51, magnification 200x

A major figure in the development of archaeology into a rigorous science was army officer and ethnologist Augustus Pitt Rivers, who began excavations on his land in England in the 1880s. Highly methodical by the standards of the time, he is widely regarded as the first scientific archaeologist. He arranged his artifacts by type or "Typology (archaeology)", and within types chronologically. This style of arrangement, designed to highlight evolutionary trends in human artifacts, was of enormous significance for accurately dating the objects. His most important methodological innovation was his insistence that all artifacts, not just beautiful or unique ones, be collected and catalogued.

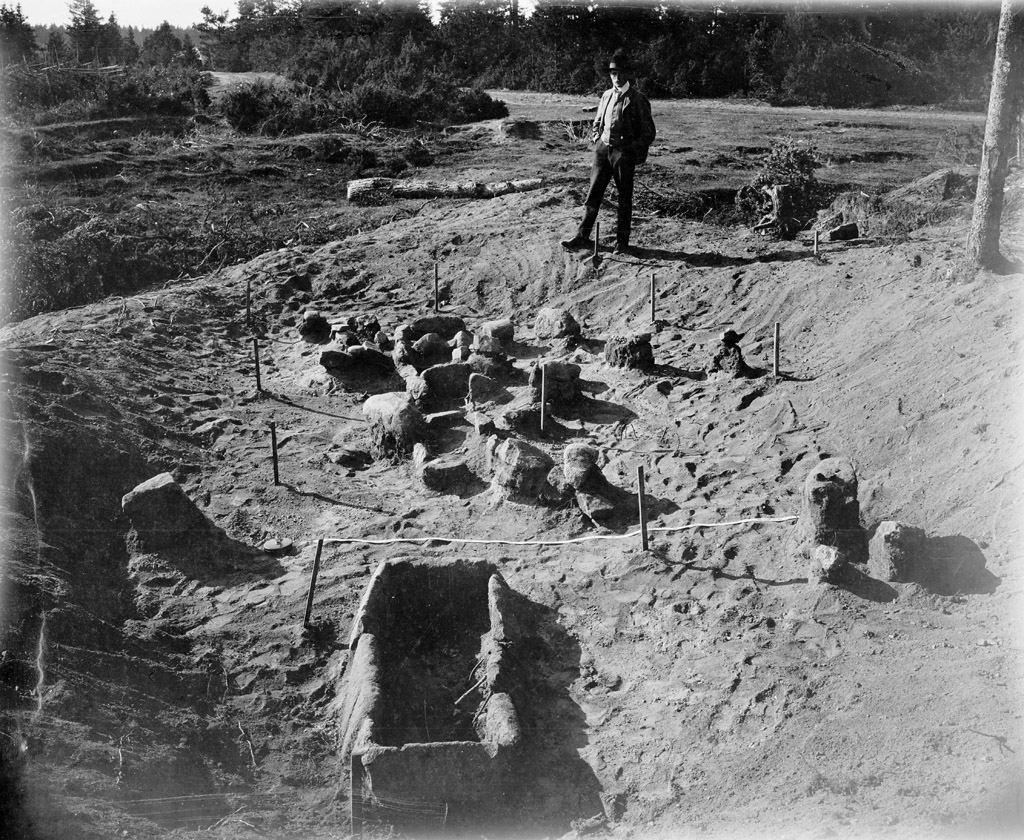
Archaeological excavation of a Stone Age settlement at Glamilders in Långbergsöda village, Saltvik, Åland, in 1906.

William Flinders Petrie is another man who may legitimately be called the Father of Archaeology. His painstaking recording and study of artifacts, both in Egypt and later in Palestine, laid the groundwork for many of the ideas behind modern archaeological recording; he remarked that "I believe the true line of research lies in the noting and comparison of the smallest details." Petrie developed the system of dating layers based on pottery and ceramic findings, which revolutionized the chronological basis of Egyptology. Petrie was the first to scientifically investigate the Great Pyramid in Egypt during the 1880s. He was also responsible for mentoring and training a whole generation of Egyptologists, including Howard Carter who went on to achieve fame with the discovery of the tomb of 14th-century BC pharaoh Tutankhamun.

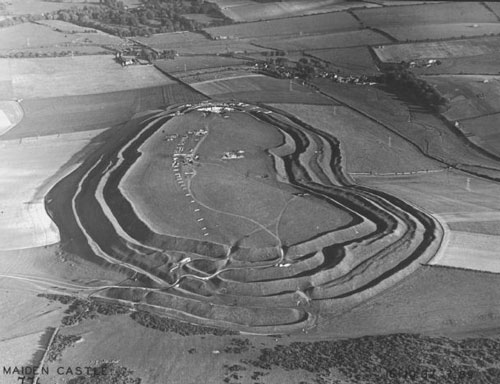
Mortimer Wheeler pioneered systematic excavation in the early 20th century. Pictured, are his excavations at Maiden Castle, Dorset, in October 1937.

The first stratigraphic excavation to gain wide public popularity was that of Hissarlik, on the site of ancient Troy, carried out by Heinrich Schliemann, Frank Calvert, and Wilhelm Dörpfeld in the 1870s. These scholars individuated nine different cities that had overlapped with one another, from prehistory to the Hellenistic period. Meanwhile, the work of Sir Arthur Evans at Knossos in Crete revealed the ancient existence of an equally advanced Minoan civilization.

The next major figure in the development of archaeology was Sir Mortimer Wheeler, whose highly disciplined approach to excavation and systematic coverage in the 1920s and 1930s brought the science on swiftly. Wheeler developed the grid system of excavation, which was further improved by his student Kathleen Kenyon.

Archaeology became a professional activity in the first half of the 20th century, and it became possible to study archaeology as a subject in universities and even schools. By the end of the 20th century, nearly all professional archaeologists, at least in developed countries, were graduates. Further adaptation and innovation in archaeology continued in this period, when maritime archaeology and urban archaeology became more prevalent, and rescue archaeology was developed in response to increasing commercial development.

== Purpose ==
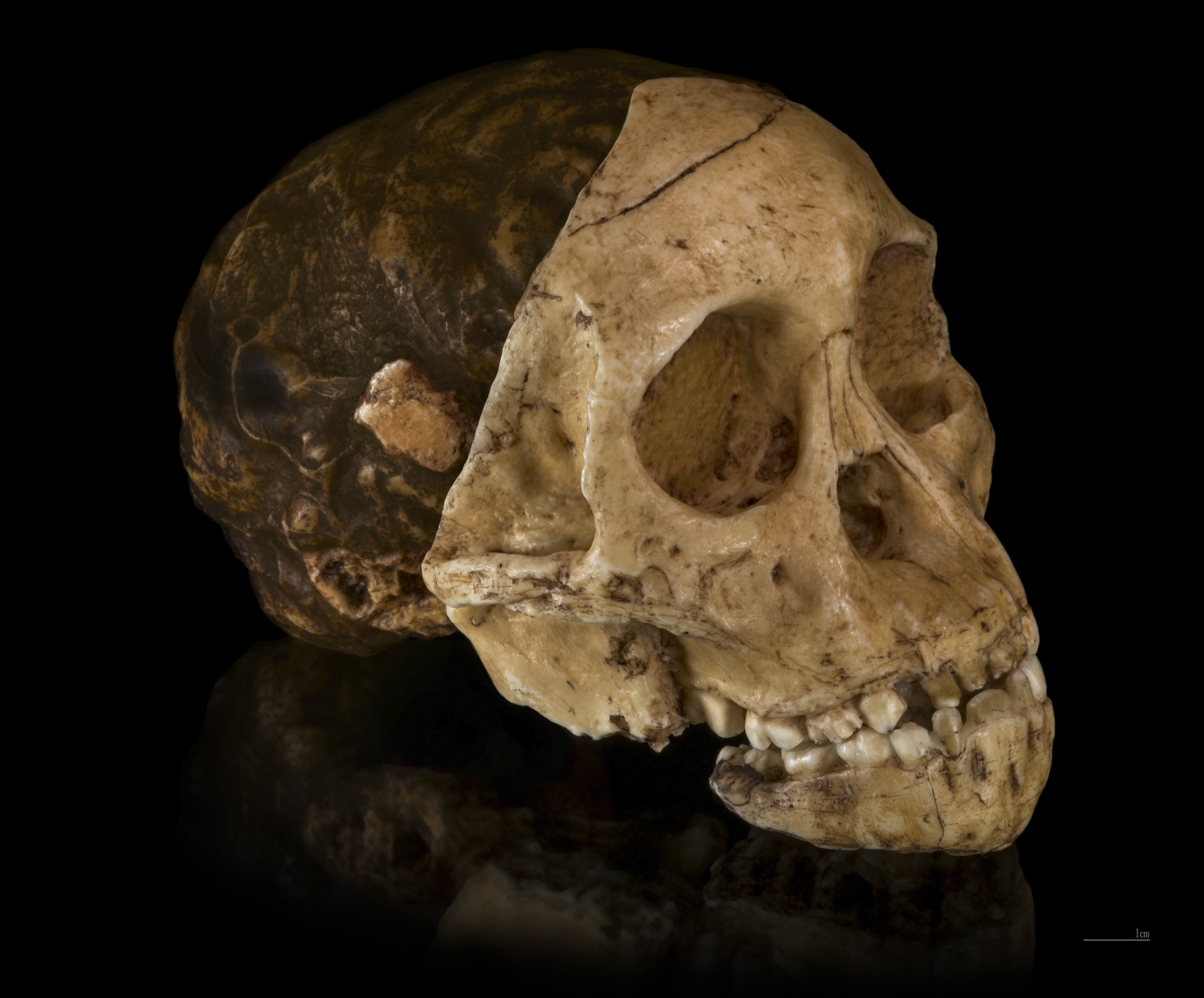
Cast of the skull of the Taung child, uncovered in South Africa. The Child was an infant of the Australopithecus africanus species, an early form of hominin

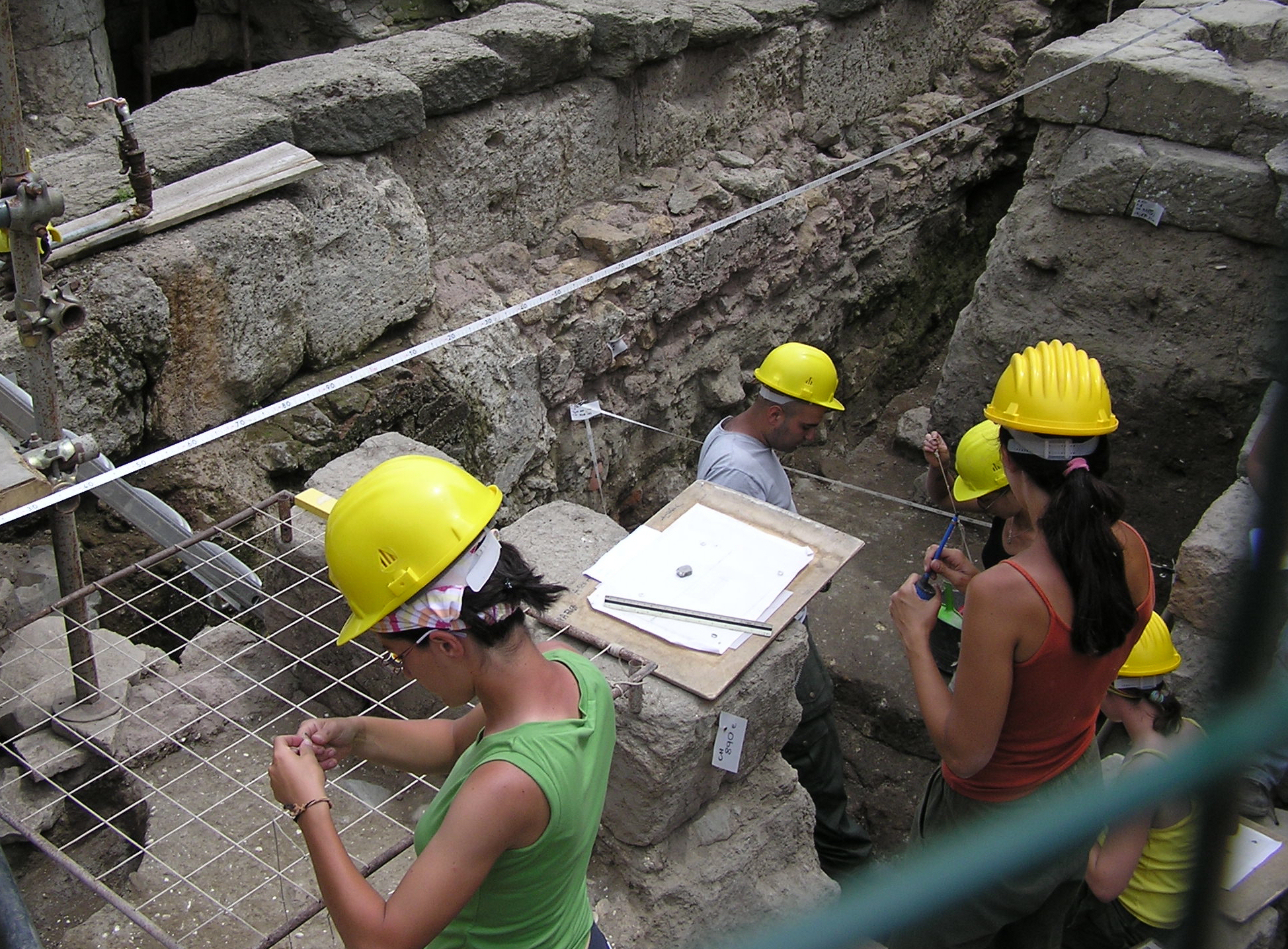
Archaeologists excavating in Rome, Italy

The purpose of archaeology is to learn more about past societies and the development of the human race. Over 99% of human development has occurred within prehistoric cultures, which did not use writing; no written records exist for study. Without such written sources, the only way to understand prehistoric societies is through archaeology. Because archaeology is the study of past human activity, it stretches back to about 2.5 million years ago when the first stone tools were found – The Oldowan Industry. Many important developments in human history occurred during prehistory, such as the evolution of humanity during the Paleolithic period, when the hominins developed from the australopithecines in Africa and eventually into modern Homo sapiens. Archaeology also sheds light on many of humanity's technological advances, for instance, the ability to use fire, the development of stone tools, the discovery of metallurgy, the beginnings of religion, and the creation of agriculture. Without archaeology, little or nothing would be known about humanity's use of material culture that predates writing.

However, it is not only prehistoric, pre-literate cultures that can be studied using archaeology; historic, literate cultures can also be studied through the sub-discipline of historical archaeology. For many literate cultures, such as Ancient Greece and Mesopotamia, their surviving records are often incomplete and biased to some extent. In many societies, literacy was restricted to the elite classes, such as the clergy or the bureaucracy of the court or the temple. The literacy of aristocrats has sometimes been restricted to deeds and contracts. The interests and worldview of elites are often quite different from those of the populace. Writings that were produced by people more representative of the general population were unlikely to find their way into libraries and be preserved there for posterity. Thus, written records tend to reflect the biases, assumptions, cultural values, and possibly deceptions of a limited range of individuals, usually a small fraction of the larger population. Hence, written records cannot be trusted as a sole source. The material record may be closer to a fair representation of society, though it is subject to its own biases, such as sampling bias and differential preservation.

Often, archaeology provides the only means of learning about the existence and behavior of people in the past. Over the millennia, many thousands of cultures and societies, and billions of people, have come and gone, with little or no written record, or with existing records that are misrepresentative or incomplete. Writing, as it is known today, did not exist in human civilization until the 4th millennium BC, and even then, only in a relatively small number of technologically advanced civilizations. In contrast, Homo sapiens has existed for at least 200,000 years, and other Homo species for millions of years (see Human evolution). These civilizations are, not coincidentally, the best known; they have been open to historical inquiry for centuries, whereas the study of prehistoric cultures has only recently emerged. Within a literate civilization, many events and important human practices may not be officially recorded. Any knowledge of the early years of human civilization – the development of agriculture, cult practices of folk religion, the rise of the first cities – must come from archaeology.

In addition to their scientific importance, archaeological remains sometimes have political or cultural significance for the descendants of the people who produced them, monetary value for collectors, or strong aesthetic appeal. Many people identify archaeology with the recovery of such aesthetic, religious, political, or economic treasures rather than with the reconstruction of past societies.

This view is often espoused in works of popular fiction, such as Raiders of the Lost Ark, The Mummy, and King Solomon's Mines. When unrealistic subjects are treated more seriously, accusations of pseudoscience are invariably levelled at their proponents (see Pseudoarchaeology). However, these endeavours, real and fictional, are not representative of modern archaeology.

=== Theory ===
There is no single approach to archaeological theory adopted by all archaeologists. When archaeology developed in the late 19th century, the first approach to archaeological theory to be practised was that of cultural-historical archaeology, which held the goal of explaining why cultures changed and adapted rather than just highlighting the fact that they did, therefore emphasizing historical particularism. In the early 20th century, many archaeologists who studied past societies with direct continuing links to existing ones (such as those of Native Americans, Siberians, Mesoamericans etc.) followed the direct historical approach, compared the continuity between the past and contemporary ethnic and cultural groups. In the 1960s, an archaeological movement largely led by American archaeologists like Lewis Binford and Kent Flannery arose that rebelled against the established cultural-history archaeology. They proposed a "New Archaeology", which would be more "scientific" and "anthropological", with hypothesis testing and the scientific method very important parts of what became known as processual archaeology.

In the 1980s, a new postmodern movement arose led by the British archaeologists Michael Shanks, Christopher Tilley, Daniel Miller, and Ian Hodder, which has become known as post-processual archaeology. It questioned processualism's appeals to scientific positivism and impartiality; it emphasized the importance of a more self-critical theoretical reflexivity. However, processualists have criticized this approach as lacking scientific rigour. The validity of both processualism and post-processualism is still under debate. Meanwhile, another theory, known as historical processualism, has emerged seeking to incorporate a focus on process and post-processual archaeology's emphasis on reflexivity and history.

Archaeological theory now borrows from a wide range of influences, including systems theory, neo-evolutionary thought,[35] phenomenology, postmodernism, agency theory, cognitive science, structural functionalism, Marxism, gender-based and feminist archaeology, queer theory, postcolonial thoughts, materiality, and posthumanism.

== Methods ==
Video showing the different works in an archaeological recovery and analysis

An archaeological investigation usually involves several distinct phases, each employing a variety of methods. Before any practical work can begin, however, a clear objective for what the archaeologists are seeking to achieve must be agreed upon. This done, a site is surveyed to learn as much as possible about it and its surroundings. Second, an excavation may be conducted to uncover any buried archaeological features. And third, the information collected during the excavation is studied and evaluated to achieve the archaeologists' original research objectives. It is then considered good practice for the information to be published so that it is available to other archaeologists and historians, although this is sometimes neglected.

=== Remote sensing ===
Before actually starting to dig at a location, remote sensing can be used to identify where sites are located within a large area or to provide more information about sites or regions. There are two types of remote sensing instruments—passive and active. Passive instruments detect natural energy reflected or emitted by the observed scene. Passive instruments sense only radiation emitted by the object being viewed or reflected by the object from a source other than the instrument. Active instruments emit energy and record the reflections. Satellite imagery is an example of passive remote sensing. Here are three active remote sensing instruments:

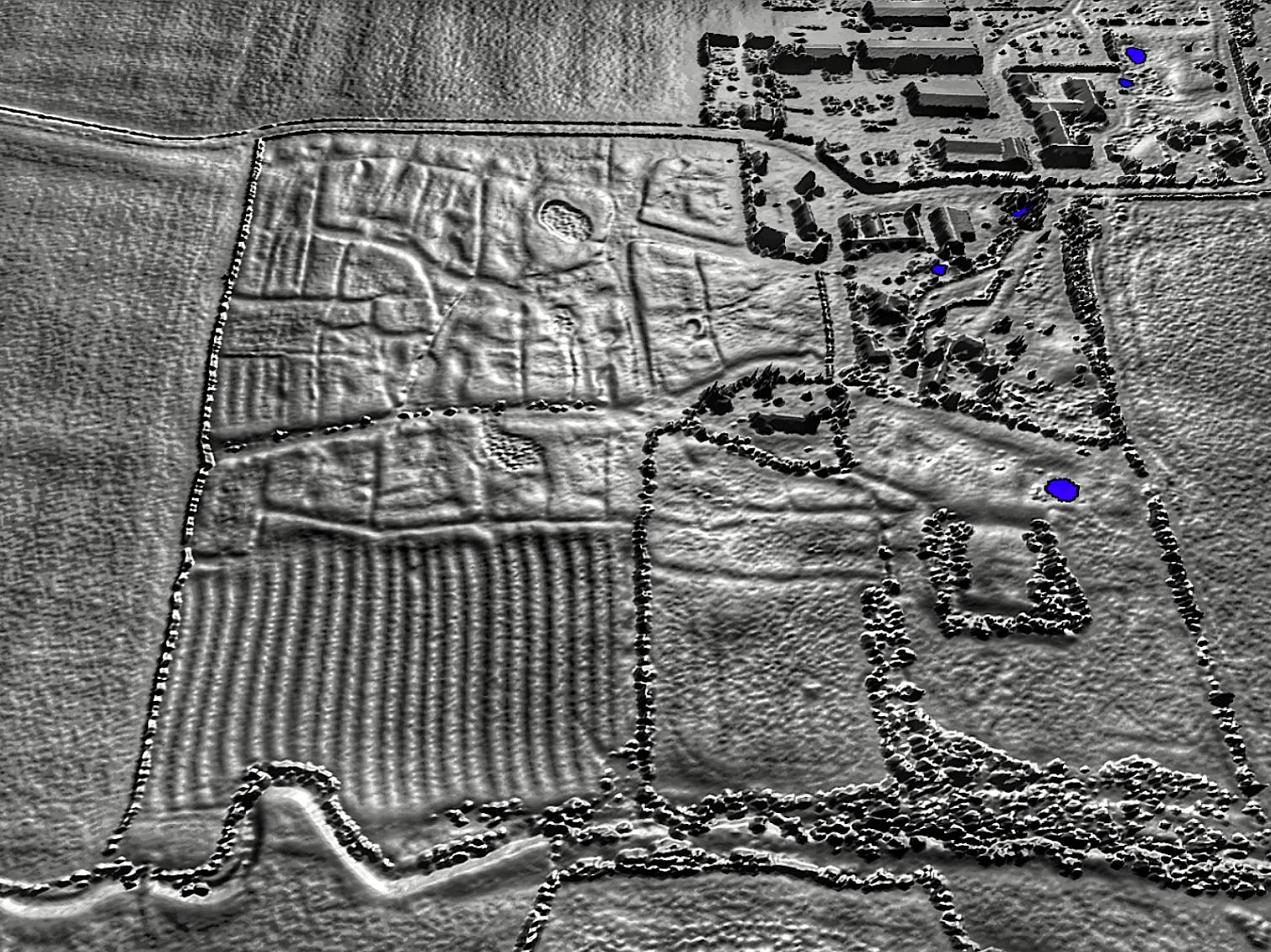
A lidar view of the site of Rand Medieval Settlement in Lincolnshire, England.

- Lidar: Lidar (light detection and ranging) uses a laser (light amplification by stimulated emission of radiation) to transmit a light pulse and a receiver with sensitive detectors to measure the backscattered or reflected light.

The distance to the object is determined by recording the time between the transmitted and backscattered pulses and using the speed of light to calculate the distance travelled. Lidars can determine atmospheric profiles of aerosols, clouds, and other atmospheric constituents.

- Laser altimeter: A laser altimeter uses a lidar (see above) to measure the height of the instrument platform above the surface. By independently determining the platform's height relative to Earth's mean surface, the topography of the underlying surface can be determined.
- Drones: Archaeologists around the world use drones to speed up survey work and protect sites from squatters, builders, and miners. In Peru, small drones helped researchers produce three-dimensional models of Peruvian sites instead of the usual flat maps – and in days and weeks instead of months and years. Drones costing as little as £650 have proven useful. In 2013, drones flew over at least six Peruvian archaeological sites, including the colonial Andean town Machu Llacta 4,000 metres (13,000 ft) above sea level. The drones continue to have altitude problems in the Andes, leading to plans to make a drone blimp, employing open source software. Jeffrey Quilter, an archaeologist with Harvard University, said, "You can go up three metres and photograph a room, 300 metres and photograph a site, or you can go up 3,000 metres and photograph the entire valley." In September 2014 drones weighing about 5 kg (11 lb) were used for 3D mapping of the above-ground ruins of the Greek city of Aphrodisias. The Austrian Archaeological Institute in Vienna is analysing the data.

=== Field survey ===
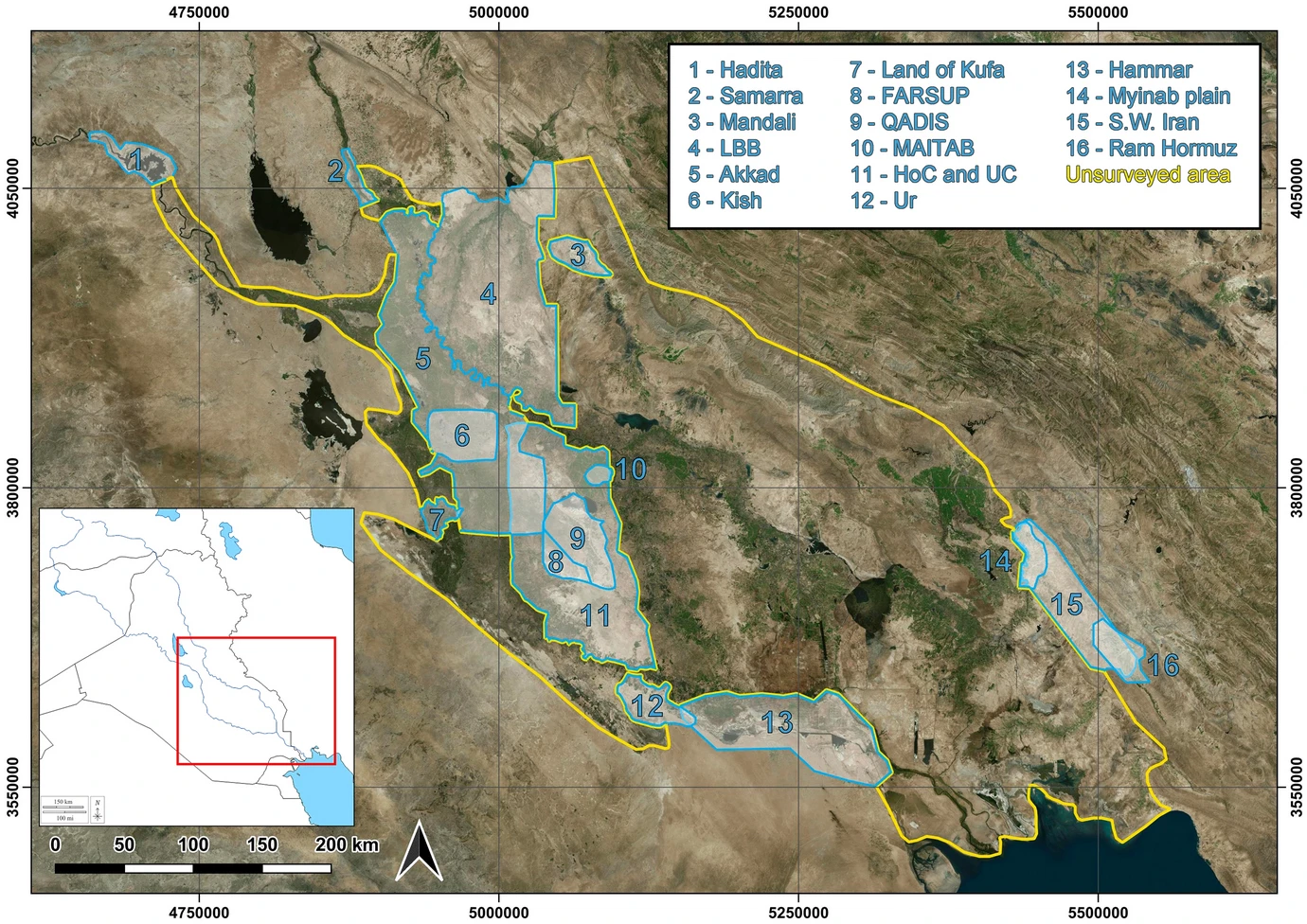
Satellite image of Mesopotamia (with the Persian Gulf in the lower right corner) indicating the areas that have been subjected to regional surveys (in blue) over the past decades

The archaeological project then continues (or begins) with a field survey. A regional survey is an attempt to locate previously unknown sites within a region systematically. A site survey is an attempt to systematically locate features of interest, such as houses and middens, within a site. Each of these two goals may be accomplished with largely the same methods.

Surveys were not widely practised in the early days of archaeology. Cultural historians and earlier researchers were usually content to discover the locations of monumental sites from the local populace and to excavate only the plainly visible features there. Gordon Willey pioneered the technique of regional settlement pattern survey in 1949 in the Viru Valley of coastal Peru, and survey of all levels became prominent with the rise of processual archaeology some years later.

Survey work has many benefits if performed as a preliminary exercise to, or even in place of, excavation. It requires relatively little time and expense because it does not involve processing large volumes of soil to search for artifacts. (Nevertheless, surveying a large region or site can be expensive, so archaeologists often employ sampling methods.) As with other forms of non-destructive archaeology, survey avoids ethical issues (of particular concern to descendant peoples) associated with destroying a site through excavation. It is the only way to gather some forms of information, such as settlement patterns and settlement structure. Survey data are commonly assembled into maps, which may show surface features and/or artifact distribution.

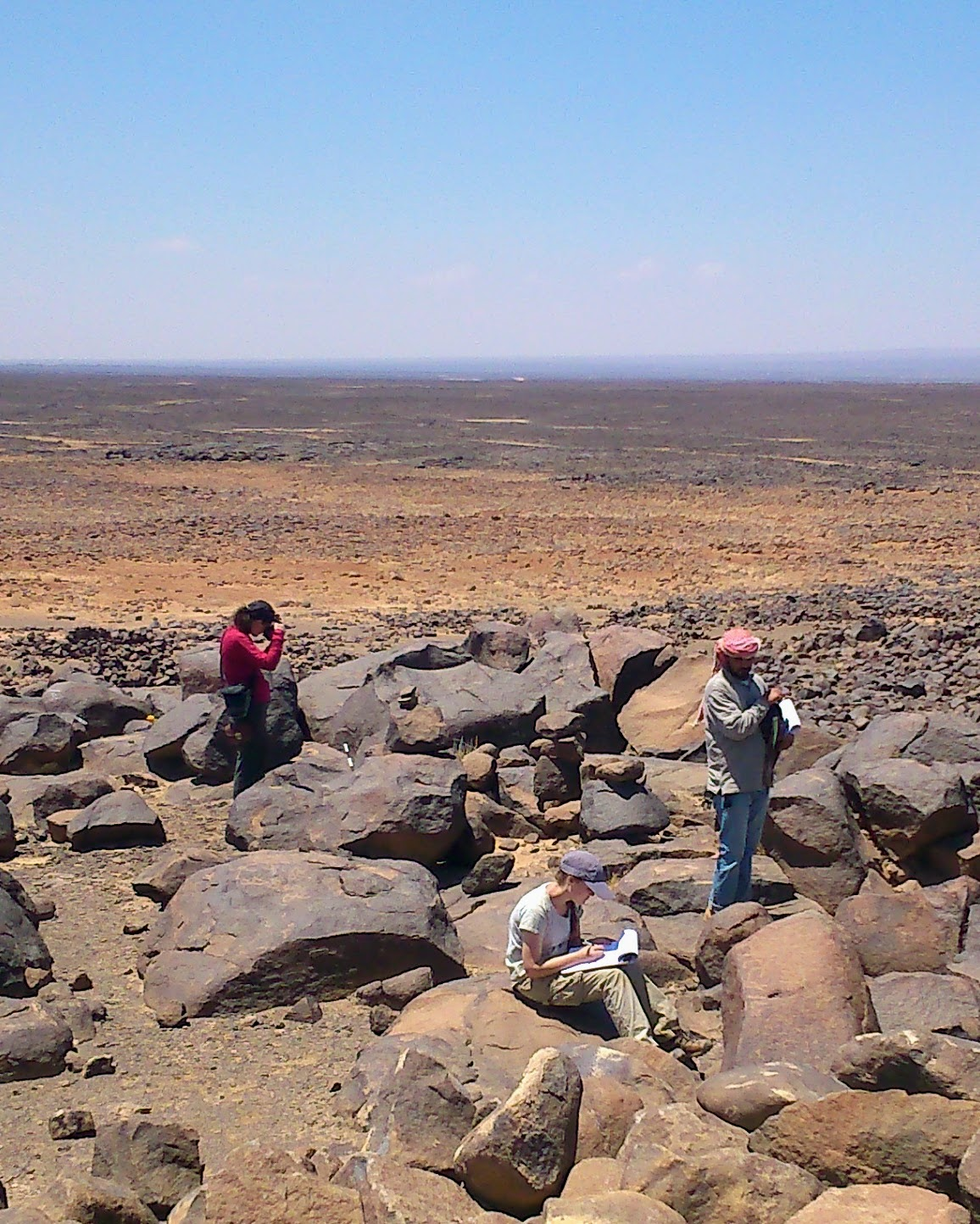
Archaeologists surveying a site in the Harrat al-Sham, eastern Jordan

The simplest survey technique is a surface survey. It involves combing an area, usually on foot but sometimes using mechanized transport, to search for features or artifacts visible on the surface. Surface survey cannot detect sites or features that are completely buried under earth or overgrown with vegetation. Surface survey may also include mini-excavation techniques such as augers, corers, and shovel test pits. If no materials are found, the area surveyed is deemed sterile.

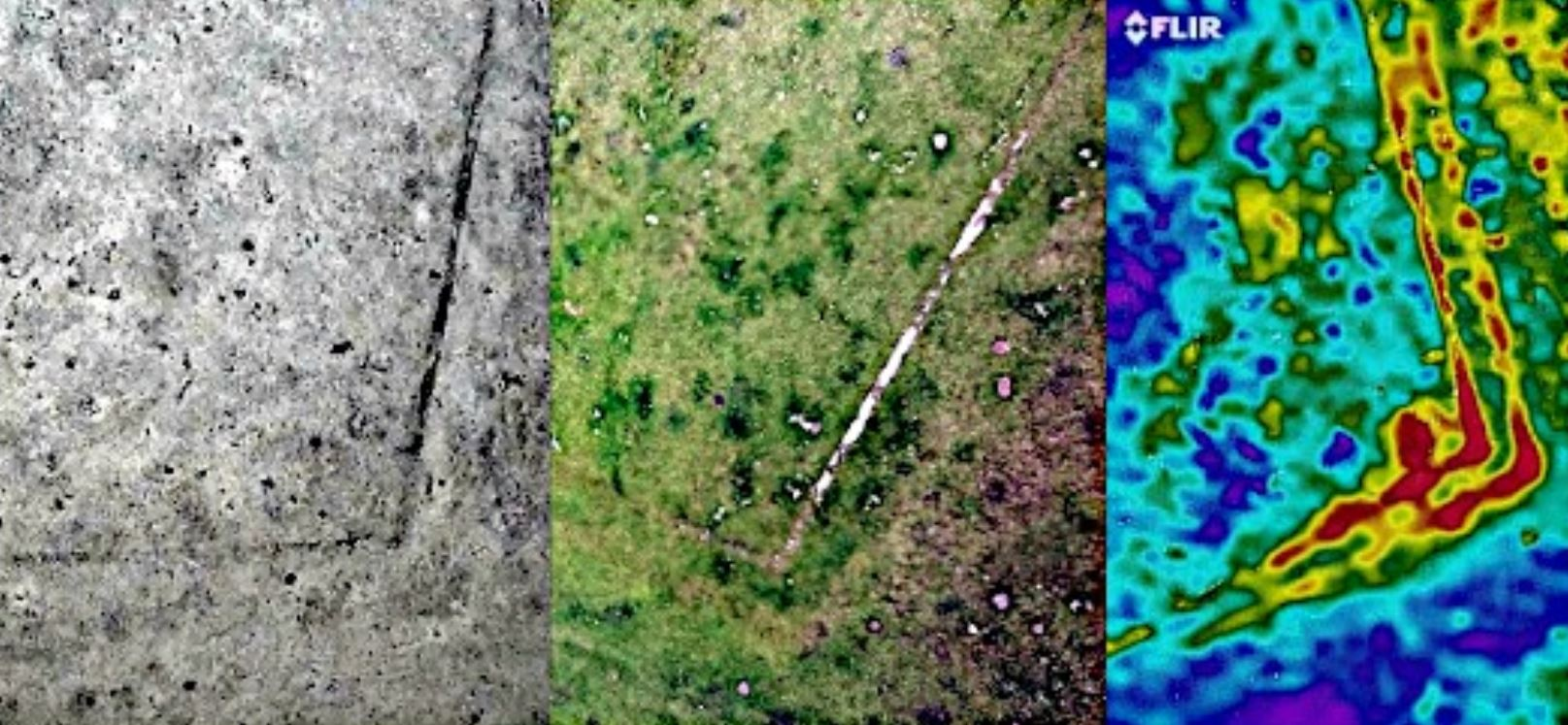
The residual foundations of a double-walled enclosure in the near infrared, visible spectrum and the thermal infrared.

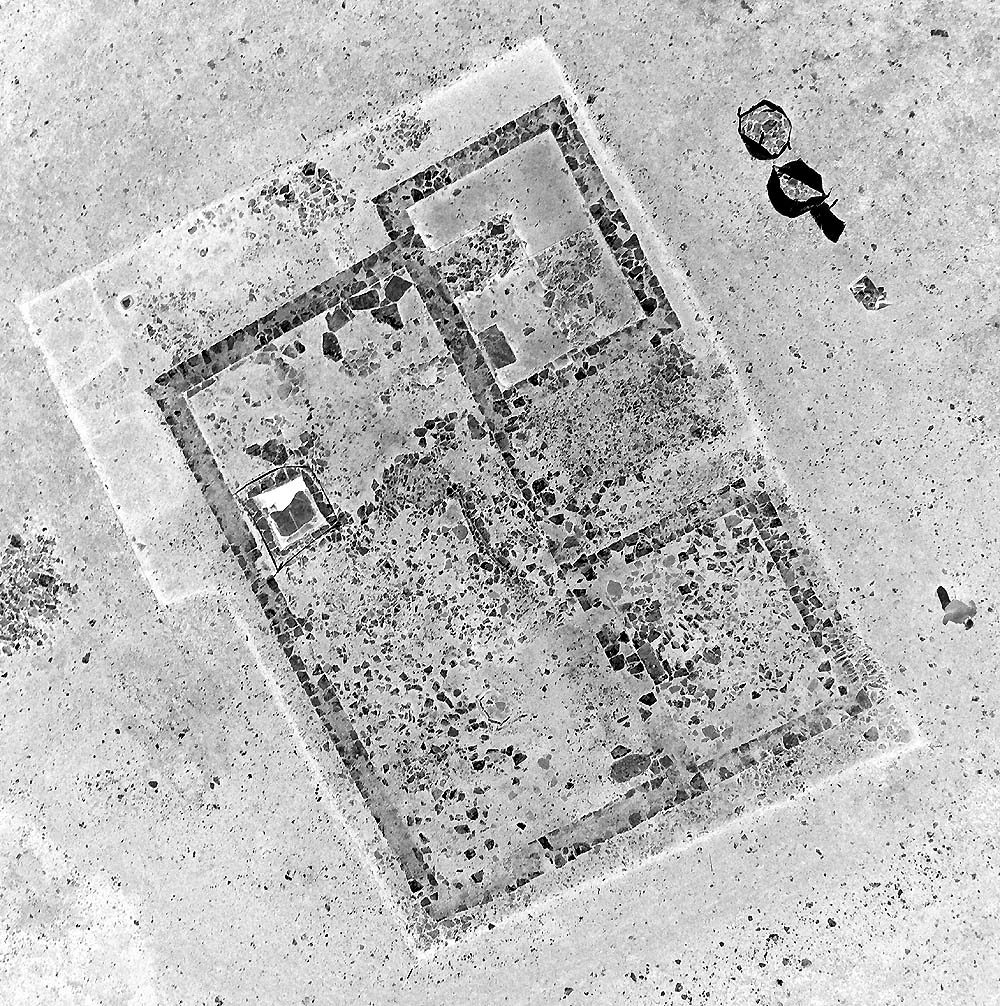
Inverted kite aerial photo of an excavation of a Roman building at Nesley near Tetbury in Gloucestershire.

Aerial survey is conducted using cameras attached to airplanes, balloons, UAVs, or even Kites. A bird's-eye view is useful for quick mapping of large or complex sites. Aerial photographs are used to document the status of the archaeological dig. Aerial imaging can also detect many things not visible from the surface. Plants growing above a buried human-made structure, such as a stone wall, will develop more slowly, while those above other types of features (such as middens) may develop more rapidly. Photographs of ripening grain, which changes colour rapidly at maturation, have revealed buried structures with great precision. Aerial photographs taken at different times of day will help show the outlines of structures by changes in shadows. Aerial survey also employs ultraviolet, infrared, ground-penetrating radar wavelengths, Lidar and thermography.

Geophysical survey can be the most effective way to see beneath the ground. Magnetometers detect minute deviations in the Earth's magnetic field caused by iron artifacts, kilns, some types of stone structures, and even ditches and middens. Devices that measure the electrical resistivity of the soil are also widely used. Archaeological features whose electrical resistivity contrasts with that of surrounding soils can be detected and mapped. Some archaeological features (such as those composed of stone or brick) have higher resistivity than typical soils. In comparison, others (such as organic deposits or unfired clay) tend to have lower resistivity.

Although some archaeologists consider the use of metal detectors to be tantamount to treasure hunting, others deem them an effective tool in archaeological surveying. Examples of formal archaeological use of metal detectors include musketball distribution analysis on English Civil War battlefields, metal distribution analysis before excavation of a 19th-century ship wreck, and service cable location during evaluation. Metal detectorists have also contributed to archaeology, where they have made detailed records of their results and refrained from raising artifacts from their archaeological context. In the UK, metal detectorists have been invited to participate in the Portable Antiquities Scheme.

Regional survey in underwater archaeology uses geophysical or remote sensing devices such as a marine magnetometer, side-scan sonar, or sub-bottom sonar.

=== Excavation ===
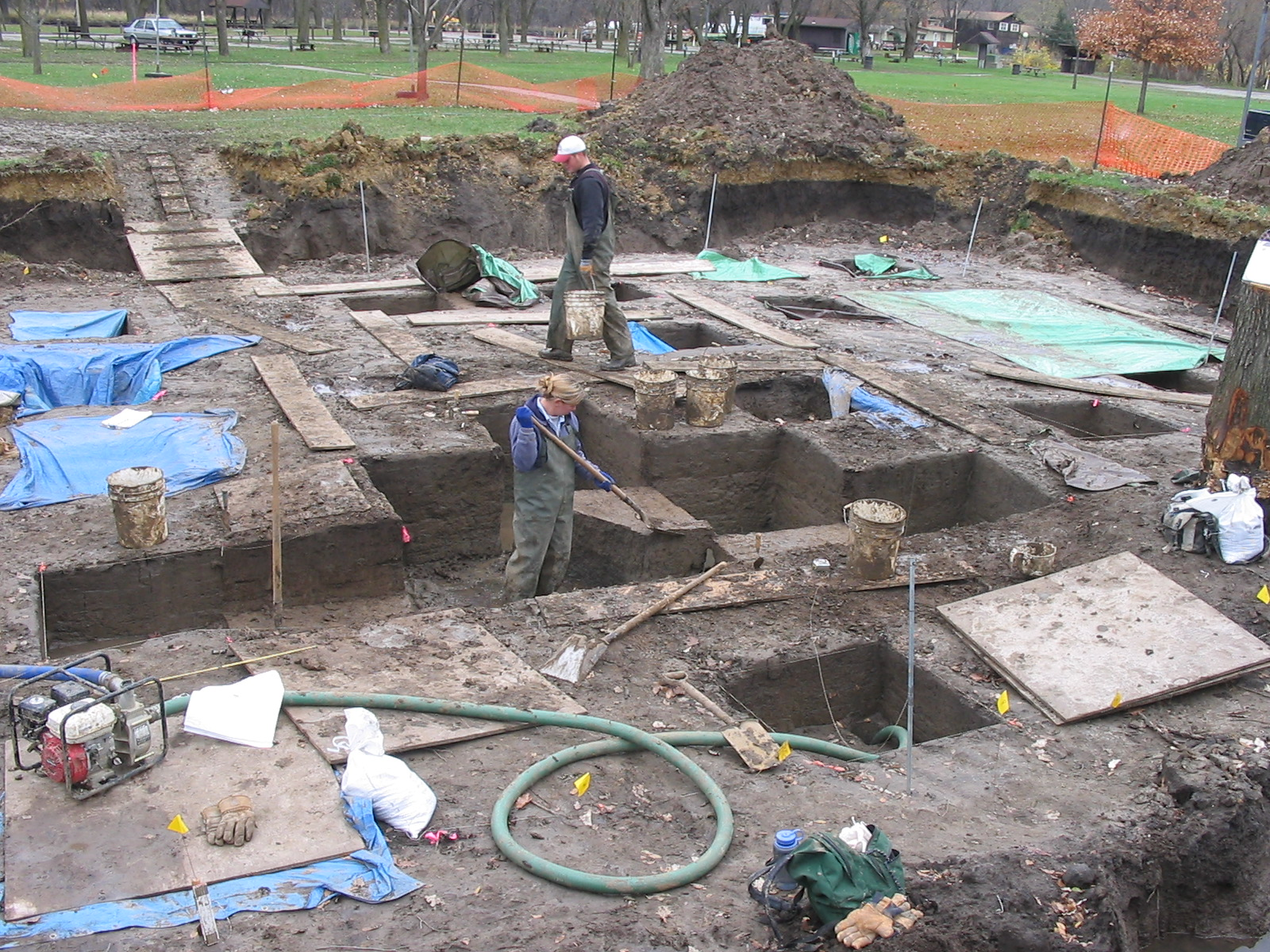
Excavations at the 3800-year-old Edgewater Park Site, Iowa

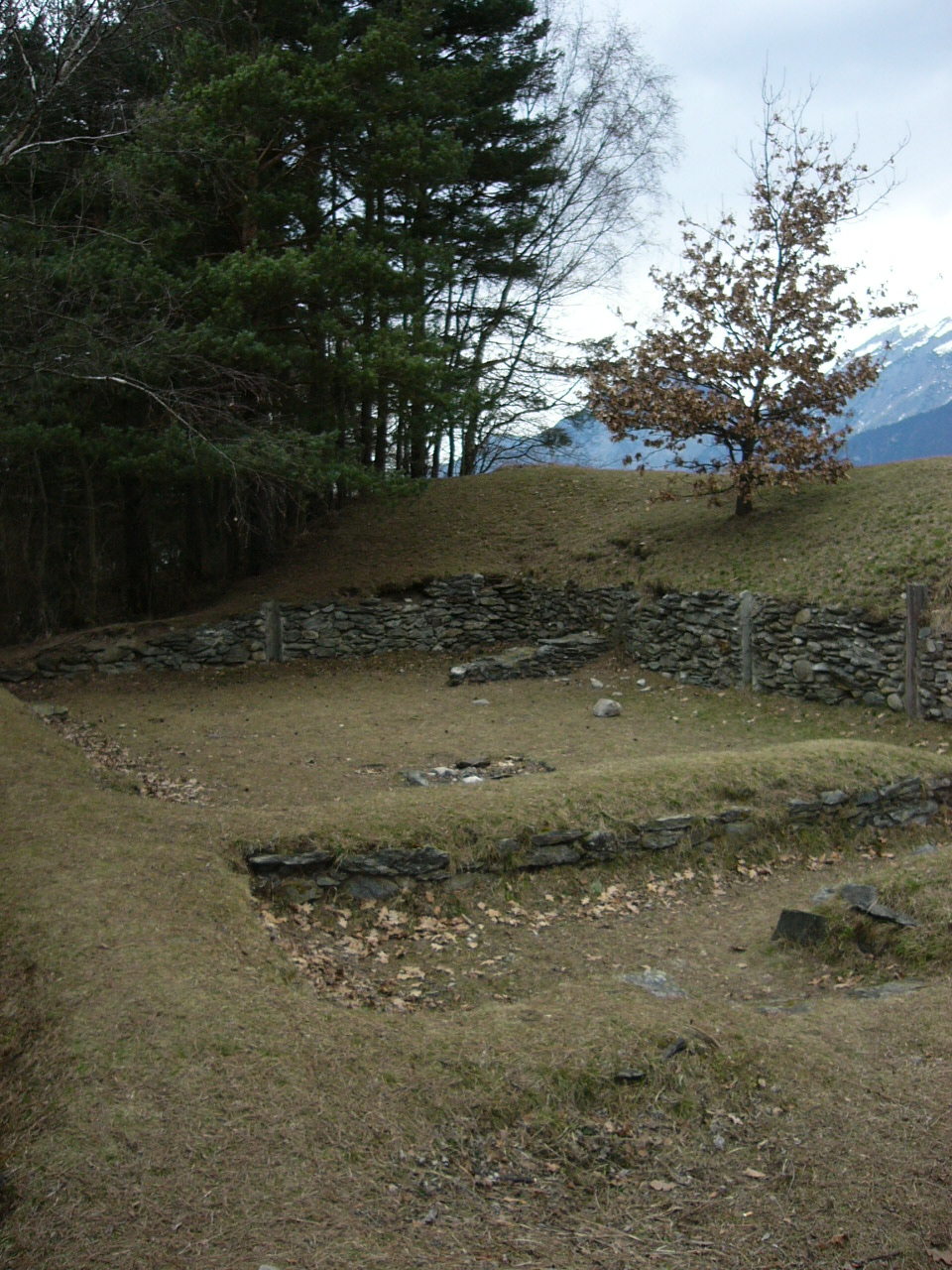
Archaeological excavation that discovered prehistoric caves in Vill (Innsbruck), Austria

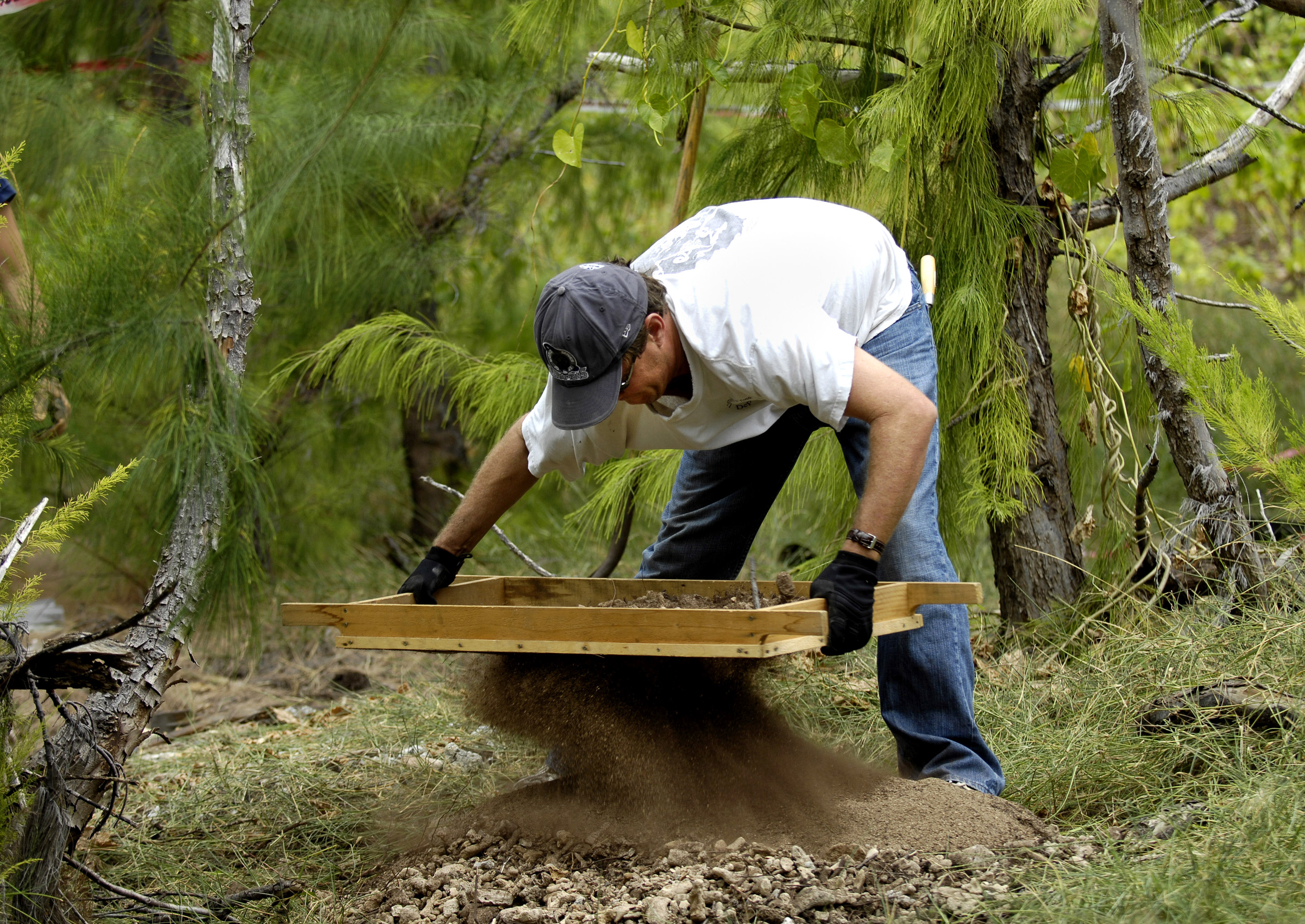
An archaeologist sifting for POW remains on Wake Island.

Archaeological excavation has existed even when the field was still the domain of amateurs, and it remains the primary source of data recovered in most field projects. It can reveal several types of information that are usually not accessible through surveys, such as stratigraphy, three-dimensional structure, and verifiably primary context.

Modern excavation techniques require that the precise locations of objects and features, known as their provenance or provenience, be recorded. This always involves determining their horizontal locations and, sometimes, their vertical positions as well (see also Primary Laws of Archaeology). Likewise, their association, or relationship with nearby objects and features, needs to be recorded for later analysis. This allows the archaeologist to deduce which artifacts and features were likely used together and which may be from different phases of activity. For example, excavation of a site reveals its stratigraphy; if a succession of distinct cultures occupied a site, artifacts from more recent cultures will lie above those from earlier ones.

Excavation is the most expensive phase of archaeological research, in relative terms. Also, as a destructive process, it carries ethical concerns. As a result, very few sites are excavated in their entirety. Again, the percentage of a site excavated depends greatly on the country and the "method statement" issued. Sampling is even more important in excavation than in survey. Sometimes large mechanical equipment, such as backhoes (JCBs), is used in excavation, especially to remove the topsoil (overburden), though this method is increasingly used with great caution. Following this rather dramatic step, the exposed area is usually hand-cleaned with trowels or hoes to ensure that all features are apparent.

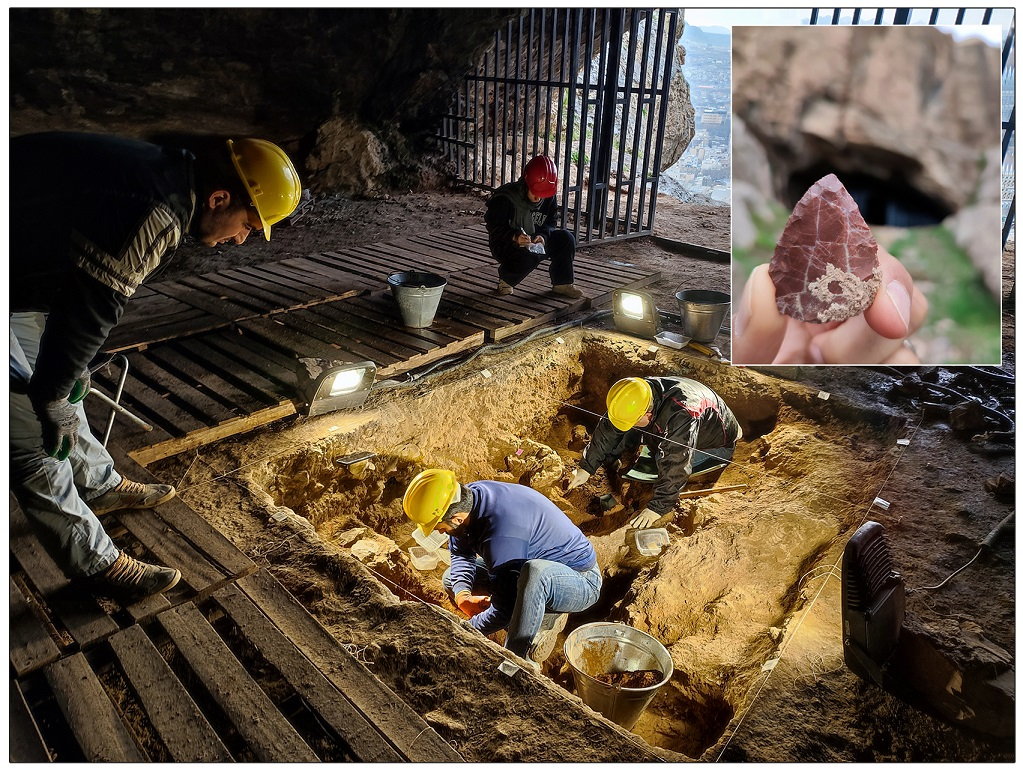
Archaeological excavations in the Middle Paleolithic cave site of the Ghamari Cave, Zagros 2025

The next task is to create a site plan and then use it to help determine the excavation method. Features dug into the natural subsoil are normally excavated in portions to produce a visible archaeological section for recording. A feature, for example, a pit or a ditch, consists of two parts: the cut and the fill. The cut describes the edge of the feature where it meets the natural soil. It is the feature's boundary. The fill is what the feature is filled with, and will often appear quite distinct from the natural soil. The cut and fill are given consecutive numbers for recording purposes. Scaled plans and sections of individual features are all drawn on site; black-and-white and colour photographs of them are taken; and recording sheets are filled in, describing the context of each feature. All this information serves as a permanent record of the now-destroyed archaeology and is used to describe and interpret the site.

=== Analysis ===
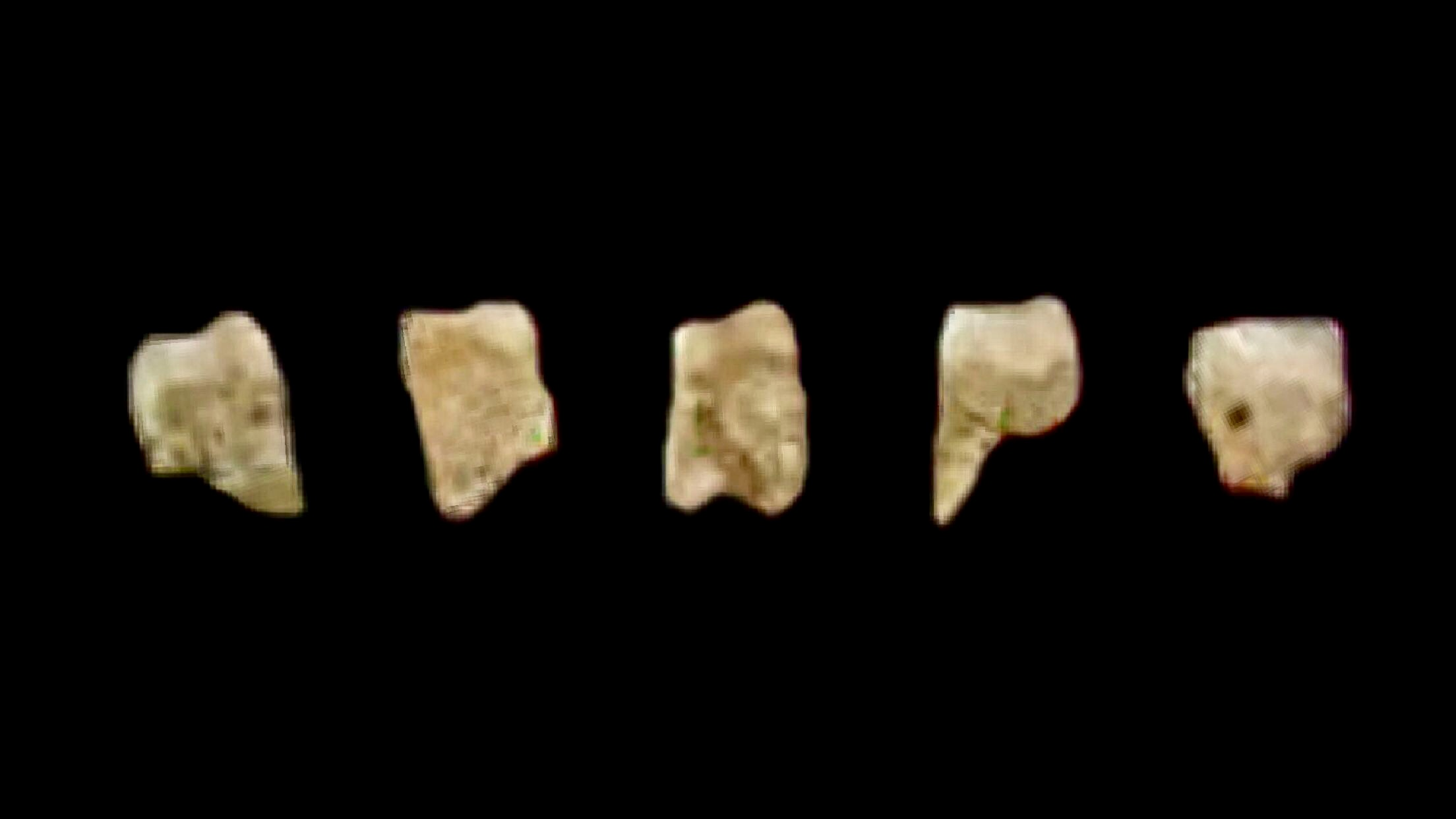
Five of the seven known fossil teeth of Homo luzonensis found in Callao Cave, the Philippines.

Once artifacts and structures have been excavated or collected during surface surveys, they must be studied properly. This process is known as post-excavation analysis, and is usually the most time-consuming part of an archaeological investigation. It is not uncommon for final excavation reports for major sites to take years to be published.

At a basic level of analysis, artifacts found are cleaned, catalogued and compared to published collections. This comparison process often involves classifying them typologically and identifying other sites with similar artifact assemblages. However, a much broader range of analytical techniques is available through archaeological science, allowing artifacts to be dated and their compositions examined. Bones, plants, and pollen collected from a site can all be analysing using the methods of zooarchaeology, paleoethnobotany, palynology and stable isotopes while any texts can usually be deciphered.

These techniques frequently provide information that would not otherwise be known, thereby contributing greatly to understanding a site.

== Subfields ==
As with most academic disciplines, there are a very large number of archaeological sub-disciplines characterized by a specific method or type of material (e.g., lithic analysis, music, archaeobotany), geographical or chronological focus (e.g. Near Eastern archaeology, Islamic archaeology, Medieval archaeology), other thematic concern (e.g. maritime archaeology, landscape archaeology, battlefield archaeology), or a specific archaeological culture or civilization (e.g. Egyptology, Indology, Sinology).

=== Historical archaeology ===
Historical archaeology is the study of cultures with some form of writing and deals with objects and issues from the past.

In medieval Europe, archaeologists have explored the illicit burial of unbaptized children in medieval texts and cemeteries. In downtown New York City, archaeologists have exhumed the 18th century remains of the African Burial Ground. When remnants of the WWII Siegfried Line were being destroyed, emergency archaeological digs were conducted whenever any part of the line was removed, to advance scientific knowledge and reveal details of its construction.

=== Ethnoarchaeology ===
Ethnoarchaeology is the ethnographic study of living people, designed to aid in our interpretation of the archaeological record. The approach first gained prominence during the processual movement of the 1960s, and continues to be a vibrant component of post-processual and other current archaeological approaches. Early ethnoarchaeological research focused on hunter-gatherer or foraging societies; today, ethnoarchaeological research encompasses a much wider range of human behaviour.

=== Experimental archaeology ===
Experimental archaeology represents the application of the experimental method to develop more highly controlled observations of processes that create and impact the archaeological record. In the context of the logical positivism of processualism with its goals of improving the scientific rigor of archaeological epistemologies, the experimental method gained importance. Experimental techniques remain a crucial component to improving the inferential frameworks for interpreting the archaeological record.

=== Archaeometry ===
Archaeometry aims to systematize archaeological measurement. It emphasizes the application of analytical techniques from physics, chemistry, and engineering. It is a field of research that frequently focuses on determining the chemical composition of archaeological remains for source analysis. Archaeometry also investigates different spatial characteristics of features, employing methods such as space syntax techniques and geodesy as well as computer-based tools such as geographic information system technology. Rare earth elements patterns may also be used. A relatively nascent subfield is that of archaeological materials, designed to enhance understanding of prehistoric and non-industrial culture through scientific analysis of the structure and properties of materials associated with human activity.

=== Digital archaeology ===
Digital Archeology is an interdisciplinary field that applies information technology (IT), digital tools, and data management techniques to archaeology. It includes virtual archeology and computational archeology.

Examples of digital archaeology include the use of computer graphics to create virtual 3D models of sites, like the throne room of an Assyrian palace or ancient Rome. Photogrammetry and digital topographical models are combined with astronomical calculations to check if structures, such as pillars, align with astronomical events like the sun's position at a solstice. Agent-based modelling and simulation are used to understand past social dynamics and outcomes. Data mining is applied to large collections of archaeological 'grey literature'.

=== Cultural resources management ===
Archaeology can be a subsidiary activity within Cultural resource management (CRM), also called Cultural heritage management (CHM) in the UK. CRM archaeologists frequently examine archaeological sites threatened by development. CRM accounts for most archaeological research done in the US and much of that in western Europe. In the US, CRM archaeology has been a growing concern since the passage of the National Historic Preservation Act (NHPA) of 1966. Most scholars and politicians believe CRM has helped preserve much of the US's history and prehistory that would otherwise have been lost to the expansion of cities, dams, and highways. Along with other statutes, the NHPA mandates that projects on federal land, or involving federal funds or permits, consider the effects of the project on each archaeological site.

The application of CRM in the UK is not limited to government-funded projects. Since 1990, PPG 16 has required planners to consider archaeology as a material consideration in determining applications for new development. As a result, archaeological organizations undertake mitigation work in advance of or during construction in archaeologically sensitive areas, at the developer's expense. Some of the largest archaeological projects ever undertaken in the UK are due to major infrastructure projects such as the A14 road improvement scheme and the construction of HS2.

In England, ultimate responsibility of care for the historic environment rests with the Department for Culture, Media and Sport in association with English Heritage. In Scotland, Wales and Northern Ireland, the same responsibilities lie with Historic Scotland, Cadw and the Northern Ireland Environment Agency respectively. In France, the Institut national du patrimoine (The National Institute of Cultural Heritage) trains curators specialized in archaeology. Their mission is to enhance the objects discovered. The curator is the link between scientific knowledge, administrative regulations, heritage objects, and the public.

Among the goals of CRM are the identification, preservation, and maintenance of cultural sites on public and private lands, and the removal of culturally valuable materials from areas where they would otherwise be destroyed by human activity, such as proposed construction. This study examines whether significant archaeological sites are present in the area affected by the proposed construction. If these do exist, time and money must be allotted for their excavation. If initial survey and/or test excavations indicate the presence of an extraordinarily valuable site, the construction may be prohibited entirely.

Cultural resources management has been criticized. CRM is conducted by private companies that bid for projects by submitting proposals outlining the work to be done and the expected budget. The agency responsible for the construction often chooses the proposal that asks for the least funding. CRM archaeologists face time pressure, often forced to complete their work in much less time than might be allotted to a purely academic project. Compounding the time pressure is the vetting process for site reports that CRM firms are required to submit to the appropriate State Historic Preservation Office (SHPO). From the SHPO's perspective, there is no difference between a report submitted by a CRM firm operating under a tight deadline and a multi-year academic project.

The ratio of open academic archaeology positions to the number of archaeology MA/MSc and PhD students is low. CRM, once an intellectual backwater for individuals with "strong backs and weak minds", has attracted these graduates, and CRM offices are increasingly staffed by advance degreed workers with a track record of producing scholarly articles, but who also have extensive CRM field experience.

== Protection ==
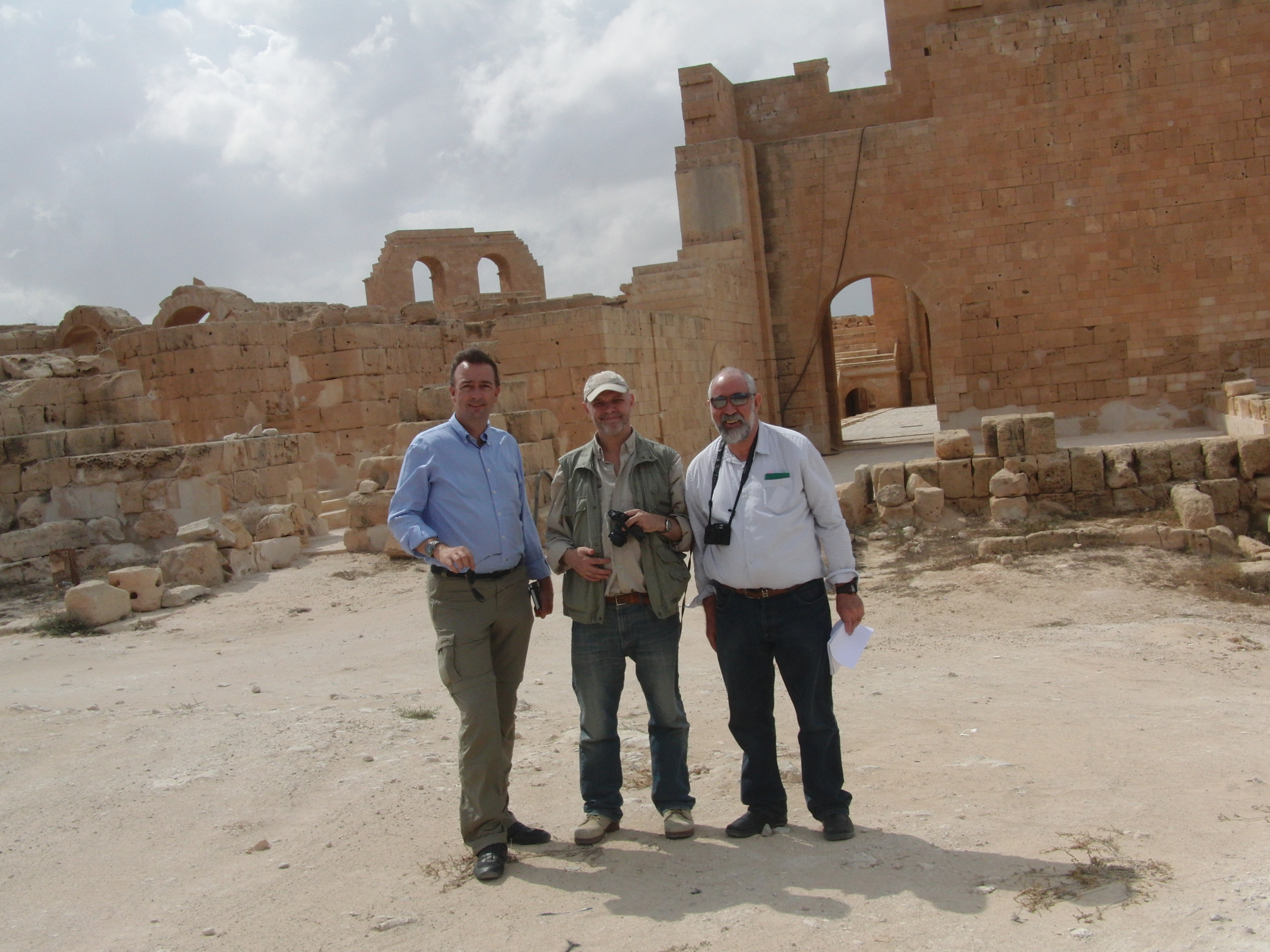
Karl von Habsburg, on a Blue Shield International fact-finding mission in Libya

The protection of archaeological finds for the public from catastrophes, wars, and armed conflicts is increasingly being implemented internationally. This happens, on the one hand, through international agreements and, on the other hand, through organizations that monitor or enforce protection. United Nations, UNESCO, and Blue Shield International deal with the protection of cultural heritage, including archaeological sites. This also applies to the integration of United Nations peacekeeping. Blue Shield International has undertaken various fact-finding missions in recent years to protect archaeological sites during the wars in Libya, Syria, Egypt, and Lebanon. The importance of archaeological finds for identity, tourism, and sustainable economic growth is repeatedly emphasized internationally.

The president of Blue Shield International, Karl von Habsburg, said during a cultural property protection mission in Lebanon in April 2019 with the United Nations Interim Force in Lebanon: "Cultural assets are part of the identity of the people who live in a certain place. If you destroy their culture, you also destroy their identity. Many people are uprooted, often have no prospects anymore, and subsequently flee from their homeland."

== Popular views of archaeology ==
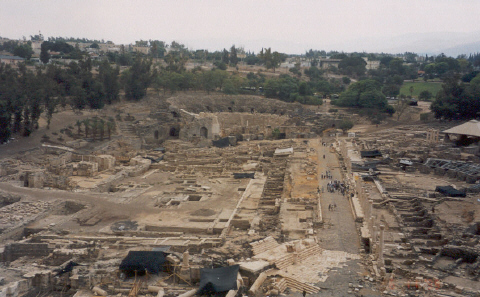
Extensive excavations at Beit She'an, Israel

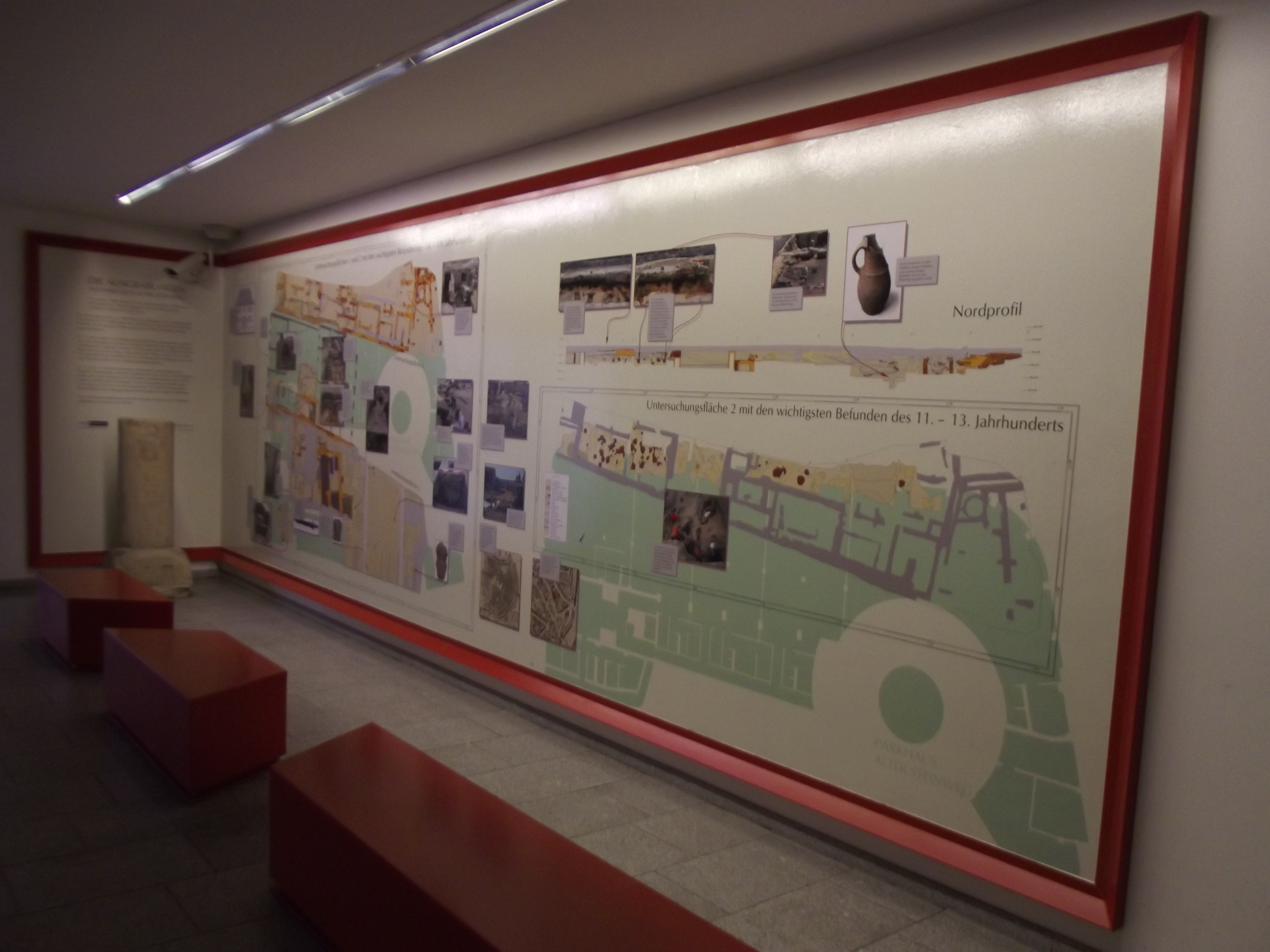
Permanent exhibition in a German multi-storey car park, explaining the archaeological discoveries made during the construction of this building

Early archaeology was largely an attempt to uncover spectacular artifacts and features or to explore vast, mysterious abandoned cities, and was mostly carried out by upper-class, scholarly men. This general tendency laid the foundation for the modern popular view of archaeology and archaeologists. Many of the public view archaeology as something only available to a narrow demographic. The job of archaeologist is depicted as a "romantic adventurist occupation", and as a hobby more than a job in the scientific community. Cinema audiences form a notion of "who archaeologists are, why they do what they do, and how relationships to the past are constituted", and are often under the impression that all archaeology takes place in a distant and foreign land, only to collect monetarily or spiritually priceless artifacts. The modern depiction of archaeology has distorted the public's perception of what it is.

Much thorough and productive research has indeed been conducted in dramatic locales such as Copán and the Valley of the Kings, but the bulk of modern archaeological activity and finds is not so sensational. Archaeological adventure stories tend to ignore the painstaking work involved in carrying out modern surveys, excavations, and data processing. Some archaeologists refer to such off-the-mark portrayals as "pseudoarchaeology". Archaeologists are also highly reliant on public support; the question of for whom they work is often discussed.

== Current issues and controversy ==
=== Public archaeology ===
Motivated by a desire to halt looting, curb pseudoarchaeology, and to help preserve archaeological sites through education and fostering public appreciation for the importance of archaeological heritage, archaeologists are mounting public-outreach campaigns. They seek to stop looting by combatting people who illegally take artifacts from protected sites, and by alerting people who live near archaeological sites of the threat of looting. Common methods of public outreach include press releases, encouraging school field trips to sites under excavation led by professional archaeologists, and making reports and publications accessible outside academia. Public appreciation of the significance of archaeology and archaeological sites often leads to improved protection from encroaching development or other threats.

One audience for archaeologists' work is the public. Archaeologists increasingly realize that their work can benefit audiences outside the field and academia, and that they have a responsibility to educate and inform the public about archaeology. Local heritage awareness is aimed at increasing civic and individual pride through projects such as community excavation programs and better public presentations of archaeological sites and knowledge. The U.S. Department of Agriculture, Forest Service (USFS) operates a volunteer archaeology and historic preservation program called the Passport in Time (PIT). Volunteers work with professional USFS archaeologists and historians on national forests throughout the U.S. Volunteers are involved in all aspects of professional archaeology under expert supervision.

Television programs, web videos, and social media can also bring an understanding of underwater archaeology to a broad audience. The Mardi Gras Shipwreck Project integrated a one-hour HD documentary, short videos for public viewing and video updates during the expedition as part of the educational outreach. Webcasting is also another tool for educational outreach. For one week in 2000 and 2001, live underwater video of the Queen Anne's Revenge Shipwreck Project was webcast to the Internet as a part of the QAR DiveLive educational program that reached thousands of children around the world. Southerly, C.; Gillman-Bryan, J. (19 February 2009). Diving on the Queen Anne's Revenge. The American Academy of Underwater Sciences. Archived from the original on 19 February 2009. Created and co-produced by Nautilus Productions and Marine Grafics, this project enabled students to talk to scientists and learn about methods and technologies used by the underwater archaeology team.

In the UK, popular archaeology programs such as Time Team and Meet the Ancestors have resulted in an upsurge in public interest. Where possible, archaeologists now make more provisions for public involvement and outreach in larger projects than they have in the past and many modern local archaeological organizations operate within the Community archaeology framework to expand public involvement in smaller-scale, more local projects. Archaeological excavation, however, is best undertaken by well-trained staff who can work quickly, carefully, and accurately. Often, this requires observing the necessary health and safety and indemnity insurance requirements when working on a modern building site with tight deadlines. Certain charities and local government bodies sometimes offer places on research projects either as part of academic work or as a defined community project. There is also an industry selling places on commercial training excavations and archaeological holiday tours.

Archaeologists prize local knowledge and often liaise with local historical and archaeological societies, which is one reason community archaeology projects are becoming more common. Often, archaeologists are assisted by the public in the locating of archaeological sites, which professional archaeologists have neither the funding nor the time to do.

Archaeological Legacy Institute (ALI), is a registered 501[c] [3] non-profit, media and education corporation registered in Oregon in 1999. ALI founded a website, The Archaeology Channel, to support the organization's mission of "nurturing and bringing attention to the human cultural heritage, by using media in the most efficient and effective ways possible."

There is a considerable international body of research focused on archaeology; public value and tangible benefits of archaeology include helping to counteract racism, documenting accomplishments of ignored communities, providing time-depth as a response to short-termism of the modern age, and contributing to human ecology, independent evidence base, historic context development and tourism.

As well as the act of discover itself ("Discovery is a positive state of mind, as is curiosity and exercising what has been called the archaeological imagination"), the delivery of public benefits through archaeology can be summarised as follows: through contributing to a shared history, artistic and cultural treasures, local values, place-making and social cohesion, educational benefits, contribution to science and innovation, health and wellbeing, and added economic value to developers.

=== Pseudoarchaeology ===
Pseudoarchaeology is an umbrella term for all activities that falsely claim to be archaeological but in fact violate commonly accepted and scientific archaeological practices. It includes much fictional archaeological work (discussed above), as well as some actual activity. Many non-fiction authors have ignored the scientific methods of processual archaeology, or the specific critiques of it contained in post-processualism.

An example of this type is the writing of Erich von Däniken. His 1968 book, Chariots of the Gods?, together with many subsequent lesser-known works, expounds a theory of ancient contacts between human civilization on Earth and more technologically advanced extraterrestrial civilizations. This theory, known as palaeocontact theory, or Ancient astronaut theory, is not exclusively Däniken's, nor did the idea originate with him. Works of this nature are usually marked by the renunciation of well-established theories based on limited evidence and the interpretation of evidence with a preconceived theory in mind.

=== Looting ===
A looter's pit on the morning following its excavation, taken at Rontoy, Huaura Valley, Peru in June 2007. Several small holes left by looters' prospecting probes can be seen, as well as their footprints.

Looting of archaeological sites is an ancient problem. For instance, many of the tombs of the Egyptian pharaohs were looted during antiquity. Archaeology stimulates interest in ancient objects, and people in search of artifacts or treasure cause damage to archaeological sites. The commercial and academic demand for artifacts contributes directly to the illicit antiquities trade. Smuggling antiquities abroad to private collectors has caused great cultural and economic damage in many countries whose governments lack the resources and/or the will to deter it. Looters damage and destroy archaeological sites, denying future generations information about their ethnic and cultural heritage. Indigenous peoples especially lose access to and control over their 'cultural resources', ultimately denying them the opportunity to know their past.

In 1937, W. F. Hodge the director of the Southwest Museum released a statement that the museum would no longer purchase or accept collections from looted contexts. The first conviction of the transport of artifacts illegally removed from private property under the Archaeological Resources Protection Act was in 1992 in the State of Indiana.

Archaeologists trying to protect artifacts may be placed in danger by looters or locals trying to protect the artifacts from archaeologists, who are viewed as looters by the locals.

Some historical archaeological sites are looted by metal detector hobbyists who search for artifacts using increasingly advanced technology. Efforts are underway among all major Archaeological organizations to increase education and legitimate cooperation between amateurs and professionals in the metal detecting community.

While most looting is deliberate, accidental looting can occur when amateurs, unaware of the importance of archaeological rigor, collect artifacts from sites and place them in private collections.

=== Descendant peoples ===
In the United States, examples such as the case of Kennewick Man have illustrated the tensions between Native Americans and archaeologists, which can be summarized as a conflict between a need to remain respectful toward sacred burial sites and the academic benefit from studying them. For years, American archaeologists dug on Indian burial grounds and other places considered sacred, removing artifacts and human remains to storage facilities for further study. In some cases, human remains were not even thoroughly studied but instead archived rather than reburied. Furthermore, Western archaeologists' views of the past often differ from those of tribal peoples. The West views time as linear; for many natives, it is cyclic. From a Western perspective, the past is long-gone; from a native perspective, disturbing the past can have dire consequences in the present.

As a consequence, American Indians attempted to prevent the archaeological excavation of sites inhabited by their ancestors. At the same time, American archaeologists believed that the advancement of scientific knowledge justified continuing their studies. This contradictory situation was addressed by the Native American Graves Protection and Repatriation Act (NAGPRA, 1990), which sought to reach a compromise by limiting research institutions' right to possess human remains. In part due to the spirit of postprocessualism, some archaeologists have begun to actively enlist the assistance of indigenous peoples likely to be descended from those under study.

Archaeologists have also been obliged to re-examine what constitutes an archaeological site in light of what native peoples consider sacred space. To many native peoples, natural features such as lakes, mountains, or even individual trees have cultural significance. Australian archaeologists have particularly explored this issue and attempted to survey these sites to help protect them from development. Such work requires close links and trust between archaeologists and the people they are trying to help and, at the same time, study.

While this cooperation presents a new set of challenges and hurdles to fieldwork, it has benefits for all parties involved. Tribal elders cooperating with archaeologists can prevent the excavation of areas of sites that they consider sacred, while the archaeologists gain the elders' aid in interpreting their finds. There have also been active efforts to recruit Aboriginal peoples directly into the archaeological profession.

==== Repatriation ====
A new trend in the heated controversy between First Nations groups and scientists is the repatriation of native artifacts to the original descendants. An example of this occurred on 21 June 2005, when community members and elders from a number of the 10 Algonquian nations in the Ottawa area convened on the Kitigan Zibi reservation near Maniwaki, Quebec, to inter ancestral human remains and burial goods—some dating back 6,000 years. It was not determined, however, if the remains were directly related to the Algonquin people who now inhabit the region. The remains may be of Iroquoian ancestry, since Iroquoian people inhabited the area before the Algonquin. Moreover, the oldest of these remains might have no relation at all to the Algonquin or Iroquois and belong to an earlier culture that previously inhabited the area.

The remains and artifacts, including jewelry, tools and weapons, were originally excavated from various sites in the Ottawa Valley, including Morrison and the Allumette Islands. They had been part of the Canadian Museum of Civilization's research collection for decades, some since the late 19th century. Elders from various Algonquin communities conferred on an appropriate reburial, eventually deciding on traditional red cedar and birch bark boxes lined with red cedar chips, muskrat and beaver pelts.

An inconspicuous rock mound marks the reburial site, where nearly 80 boxes of various sizes are buried. Because of this reburial, no further scientific study is possible. Although negotiations between the Kitigan Zibi community and the museum were at times tense, they reached an agreement.

=== African diaspora archaeology ===
African Diaspora Archaeology is an area of study within the subfield of historical archaeology that studies those that have been forcibly transported through the Atlantic Slave Trade, the Trans-Saharan Slave Trade, and the Indian Ocean Slave Trade, as well as their descendants. Although of global relevance, most research has been conducted in the Americas and Africa.

In the United States, as with the experience of Native Americans, the history of African diaspora archaeology is one of controversy over Whiteness in archaeology and anthropology, and a lack of inclusion of the African-descendant community, and possession of human remains in the collections of universities and museums. In the 1990s, anthropologist Michael Blakey was the director of research during the New York African Burial Ground Project where he initiated a protocol for collaborating with the African descendant community. In 2011, the Society of Black Archaeologists was created in the United States. Co-founders Ayana Omilade Flewellen, archaeologist at the University of California, Riverside and Justin Dunnavant, archaeologist and assistant professor of anthropology at the University of California, Los Angeles intend to build a restorative justice-based structure in archaeology. They suggest defining descendants not only in genealogical terms, but also to welcome input of African Americans whose ancestors had a shared historical experience in enslavement.

The United States Senate unanimously passed a bill in December 2020 that centers African American cemeteries at risk in South Carolina. The bill is made to protect historic African burial grounds and can lead to the creation of an African American Burial Grounds Network. Barbados, eight days after becoming a republic on November 30, 2021, announced plans for the construction of the Newton Enslaved Burial Ground Memorial as well as a museum dedicated to the history of the Atlantic slave trade. The Ghanaian-British architect David Adjaye is to lead the project that is to commemorate an estimated 570 West Africans buried in unmarked graves at the site of the former Newton sugar plantation. Barbados can be seen as a good example of respectful preservation of an African burial ground. Throughout the Americas however the burial grounds are in danger of being destroyed or human remains are being excavated without the descendant community being involved. In 2022, residents on Sint Eustatius, Dutch Caribbean spoke out strongly against what they found were unethical excavations of their ancestors on the Godet African Burial Ground and the Golden Rock African Burial Ground.

=== Climate change and archaeology ===
As anthropogenic climate change affects our environment, projections show that there will be changes in rainfall with increased drought and desertification, increases in intensity and frequency of rainfall, increases in temperature (winter and summer), increases in both the temperature and frequency of heatwaves, rising sea levels, and warmer seas, ocean acidification and changes in oceanic currents. These climate drivers will result in changes to flora and fauna and to ground conditions (both on and below the surface), thereby affecting archaeological deposits and structures; human responses to the climate crisis will also impact archaeological sites. The archaeologist's knowledge and skills are relevant to supporting society in adapting to a changing climate and a low-carbon future. Another effect of higher temperatures has been the melting of glaciers and ice patches. This has led to the discovery of artifacts and bodies long buried in the ice, fostering the new field of glacial archaeology.

Archaeological sites can be seen as habitats that support ecosystems and fulfill biodiversity goals.

=== AI in archaeology ===
As artificial intelligence (AI) continues to influence scientific research, its application in archaeological studies has become increasingly significant. For instance, AI models have been utilized to identify archaeological remains in the Empty Quarter of the Arabian Peninsula. Additionally, AI technology has facilitated the discovery of 303 new geoglyphs in Nazca. AI is also useful in the translation of language and text, and can be used to help preserve cultural heritage. Furthermore, with the help of LiDAR scanning, AI can also be used to create a 3D model of archaeological sites, such as in the Maya Lowlands where researchers are using these two technologies today.

However, as the integration of AI in archaeology progresses, the risks in overuse of this become more apparent. The use of AI in archaeology creates a risk of oversimplification of data that is otherwise very complex. This oversimplification creates changes in how the data is interpreted, and creates concerns over the fostering of a deterministic view. Another concern over AI is that it has the potential to perpetuate old and outdated ideas.

As a tool AI will continue to grow in all scientific fields, with similar supportive and opposing arguments across all disciplines. While it can be used in some beneficial contexts, such as an instrument for translation, it also has the potential to do harm, such as the perpetuation of outdated ideas and the oversimplification of otherwise extremely complex data. Kansa has called for archaeologists to resist replacing human-curated, open scholarship with commercial AI summaries that prioritize engagement and plausibility over truth and ethical stewardship .

== See also ==
- Aerial archaeology
- Anthropology – Scientific study of humans, human behavior, and societies
- Archaeoastronomy – Interdisciplinary study of astronomies in cultures
- Archaeobiology
- Archaeogenetics – Study of ancient DNA
- Archaeological science – Application of scientific techniques to archaeology
- Archaeology and racism
- Archaeology of religion and ritual
- Archival research – Type of research using evidence from archival records
- Area of archaeological potential – Location likely containing archaeological finds
- Bioarchaeology – Sub-discipline of archaeology
- Chronological dating – Methods for estimating a realistic date for an event or object
- Classical archaeology – Sub-discipline of archaeology
- Computational archaeology – Archaeological sub-discipline
- Conservation and restoration of archaeological sites – Process in archaeology
- Digital archaeology – Application of digital technology to archaeology
- Disturbance (archaeology) – Change to an archaeological site
- Dump digging – Excavating garbage dumps to find objects of interest
- Environmental archaeology – Sub-discipline of archaeology
- Environmental history – Specialisation of history
- Geophysical survey (archaeology) – Non-invasive physical sensing techniques used for archaeological imaging or mapping
- GIS in archaeology – System to capture, manage, and present geographic data
- Glossary of archaeology
- Harris matrix – Method of depicting site stratigraphy
- Human ecology – Study of humans and their environment
- Intellectual Property Issues in Cultural Heritage project – Cultural heritage research initiative
- Landscape archaeology – Sub-discipline of archaeology and archaeological theory
- Landscape history – Study of changes in the physical environment caused by human activities
- Magnetic survey (archaeology) – Magnetic detection of archaeological artefacts and features
- Maritime archaeology – Archaeological study of human interaction with the sea
- Nationalism and archaeology
- Palaeoanthropology – Study of ancient humans
- Remote sensing in archaeology
- Urban archaeology – Archaeological sub-discipline
- Zooarchaeology – Analysis of animal remains found in archaeological sites

Lists

- List of archaeological excavations by date
- List of archaeological periods
- List of archaeological sites by country
- List of archaeologists
- List of archaeology awards
- List of paleoethnobotanists

== Bibliography ==
- Aldenderfer, M. S.; Maschner, H. D. G., eds. (1996). Anthropology, Space, and Geographic Information Systems. New York, New York: Oxford University Press.
- Ascher, R. (1961). "Analogy in archaeological interpretation". Southwestern Journal of Anthropology. 17 (4). University of New Mexico: 317–325. doi:10.1086/soutjanth.17.4.3628943. JSTOR 3628943.
- Ascher, R. (1961). "Experimental Archeology". American Anthropologist. 63 (4): 793–816. doi:10.1525/aa.1961.63.4.02a00070.
- Billman, B. R.; Feinman, G. (1999). Settlement Pattern Studies in the Americas – Fifty Years Since Virú. Washington, D.C.: Smithsonian Institution Press.
- Binford, L. (1962). "Archaeology as Anthropology". American Antiquity. 28 (4). Society for American Archaeology: 217–225. doi:10.2307/278380. JSTOR 278380.
- Deetz, James (1989). "Archaeography, Archaeology, or Archeology?". American Journal of Archaeology. 93 (3): 429–435. doi:10.2307/505592. JSTOR 505592.
- Denning, K. (2004). "The Storm of Progress' and Archaeology for an Online Public". Internet Archaeology. 15.
- Ebrey, Patricia Buckley (1999). The Cambridge Illustrated History of China. Cambridge University Press. ISBN 978-0-521-43519-2.
- Fash, William (2001). "Archaeology". In David L. Carrasco (ed.). The Oxford Encyclopedia of Mesoamerican Cultures. Vol. 1. New York: Oxford University Press. pp. 25–35. ISBN 978-0-19-510815-6. Archived from the original on 22 May 2023.
- Flannery, K. V. (1967). "Culture History v. Culture Process: A Debate in American archaeology". Scientific American. 217 (2): 119–122. doi:10.1038/scientificamerican0867-119.
- Flannery, K. V. (1982). "The Golden Marshalltown: A Parable for the Archaeology of the 1980s". American Anthropologist. 84 (2): 265–278. doi:10.1525/aa.1982.84.2.02a00010.
- Fraser, Julius Thomas; Francis C. Haber (1986). Time, Science, and Society in China and the West. Amherst, Massachusetts: University of Massachusetts Press.
- Glascock, M. D.; Neff, H.; Stryker, K. S. & Johnson, T. N. (1994). "Sourcing archaeological obsidian by an abbreviated NAA procedure". Journal of Radioanalytical and Nuclear Chemistry. 180 (1): 29–35. Bibcode:1994JRNC..180...29G. doi:10.1007/BF02039899.
- Gifford-Gonzalez, D. P.; Damrosch, D. B.; Damrosch, D. R.; Pryor, J. & Thunen, R. L. (1985). "The Third Dimension in Site Structure: An Experiment in Trampling and Vertical Dispersal". American Antiquity. 50 (4): 803–818. doi:10.2307/280169. JSTOR 280169.
- Gladfelter, B. G. (1977). "Geoarchaeology: The Geomorphologist and Archaeology". American Antiquity. 42 (4). Society for American Archaeology: 519–538. Bibcode:1977AmAnt..42..519G. doi:10.2307/278926. JSTOR 278926.
- Gould, R. (1971a). "The Archaeologist as Ethnographer: A Case from the Western Desert of Australia". World Archaeology. 3 (2): 143–177. doi:10.1080/00438243.1969.9979499.
- Gould, R.; Koster, D. A. & Sontz, A. H. L. (1971b). "The Lithic Assemblage of the Western Desert Aborigines of Australia". American Antiquity. 36 (2): 149–169. doi:10.2307/278668. JSTOR 278668.
- Gould, R.; Yellen, J. (1987). "Man the hunted: Determinants of household spacing in desert and tropical foraging societies". Journal of Anthropological Archaeology. 6 (1): 77. Bibcode:1987JAnAr...6...77G. doi:10.1016/0278-4165(87)90017-1.
- Haviland, William A.; Prins, Harald E. L.; McBride, Bunny; Walrath, Dana (2010). Cultural Anthropology: The human challenge (13th ed.). Cengage. ISBN 978-0-495-81082-7.
- Hinshaw, J. (2000). Ethnobotanical and Archaeobotanical Relationships: A Yuman case study. Salinas: Coyote Press. pp. 3–7, 38–45.
- Hodder, I. (1982). Symbols in Action. Cambridge University Press.
- Hodder, I. (1985). "Post-processual archaeology". In Schiffer, M. B. (ed.). Advances in Archaeological Method and Theory. New York: Academic Press.
- Hodder, I., ed. (1987). The Archaeology of Contextual Meaning. New York: Cambridge University Press.
- Hodder, I. (1990). "Style as historical quality". In Hastorf, M. (ed.). The Uses of Style in Archaeology. Cambridge University Press.
- Hodder, I. (1991). "Interpretive Archaeology and Its Role". American Antiquity. 56 (1). Society for American Archaeology: 7–18. doi:10.2307/280968. JSTOR 280968.
- Hodder, I. (1992). Theory and Practice in Archaeology. London, UK: Routledge.
- Kipfer, Barbara Ann (2000). Encyclopedic Dictionary of Archaeology. Boston, Massachusetts: Kluwer Academic Publishers. ISBN 978-1-4757-5133-8.
- Kuznar, L., ed. (2001). Ethnoarchaeology of Andean South America. Ann Arbor, Michigan: International Monographs in Prehistory.
- Miller, D.; Tilley, C. (1984). "Ideology, power, and prehistory: An introduction". In Miller, D.; Tilley, C. (eds.). Ideology, Power, and Prehistory. Cambridge: Cambridge University Press. ISBN 978-0-521-25526-4. OCLC 241599209.
- Miller, D.; Rowlands, M.; Tilley, C., eds. (1989). Dominion and Resistance. New York, New York: Routledge.
- Ogundele, S. O. (2005). "Ethnoarchaeology of domestic space and spatial behaviour among the Tiv and Ungwai of central Nigeria". African Archaeological Review. 22 (1): 25–54. doi:10.1007/s10437-005-3158-2.
- Pauketat, Timothy R. (March 2001). "Practice and history in archaeology: An emerging paradigm". Anthropological Theory. 1 (1): 73–98. doi:10.1177/146349960100100105.
- Renfrew, C.; Bahn, P. G. (1991). Archaeology: Theories, Methods, and Practice. London, England: Thames and Hudson Limited. ISBN 978-0-500-27867-3.
- Saraydar, S. C.; Shimada, I. (1971). "A Quantitative Comparison of Efficiency Between A Stone Axe and A Steel Axe". American Antiquity. 36 (2): 216–217. doi:10.2307/278680. JSTOR 278680.
- Saraydar, S. C.; Shimada, I. (1973). "Experimental archaeology: A new outlook". American Antiquity. 38 (3): 344–350. doi:10.2307/279722. JSTOR 279722.
- Sellet, F.; Greaves, R. & Yu, P.-L. (2006). Archaeology and Ethnoarchaeology of Mobility. Gainesville: University Press of Florida.
- Shanks, M.; Tilley, C. (1987). Reconstructing Archaeology. New York: Cambridge University Press.
- Shanks, M.; Tilley, C. (1988). Social Theory and Archaeology. Albuquerque, New Mexico: University of New Mexico Press. ISBN 978-0-7456-0184-7.
- Shanks, M. (1991). "Some recent approaches to style and social reconstruction in classical archaeology". Archaeological Review from Cambridge. 10: 164–174.
- Shanks, M. (1993). "Style and the design of a perfume jar from an Archaic Greek city state". Journal of European Archaeology. 1 (1): 77–106. doi:10.1179/096576693800731190.
- Shott, M. J.; Sillitoe, P. (2005). "Use life and curation in New Guinea experimental used flakes". Journal of Archaeological Science. 32 (5): 653–663. Bibcode:2005JArSc..32..653S. doi:10.1016/j.jas.2004.11.012.
- Tassie, G. J.; Owens, L. S. (2010). Standards of Archaeological Excavations: A Fieldguide to the Methodology, Recording Techniques and Conventions. London, England: GHP. ISBN 978-1-906137-17-5.
- Taylor, W. W. (1948). A Study of Archaeology. Menasha: American Anthropological Association. ISBN 978-0-906367-12-4.
- Tilley, Christopher, ed. (1993). Interpretive Archaeology. Oxford, England: Berg. ISBN 978-0-85496-842-8.
- Trigger, B. G. (1989). A History of Archaeological Thought. Cambridge, UK: Cambridge University Press.
- Watters, M. R. (1992). Principles of Geoarchaeology: A North American Perspective. Tucson, Arizona: The University of Arizona Press.
- Watters, M. R. (2000). "Alluvial stratigraphy and geoarchaeology in the American Southwest". Geoarchaeology. 15 (6): 537–557. Bibcode:2000Gearc..15..537W. doi:10.1002/1520-6548(200008)15:6<537::AID-GEA5>3.0.CO;2-E.
- Willey, G. R. (1953). Prehistoric Settlement Patterns in the Virú Valley, Perú. Washington, D.C.
- Willey, G. (1968). Settlement Archaeology. Palo Alto, California: National Press.
- Wylie, A. (1985). "The reaction against analogy". In Schiffer, Michael B. (ed.). Advances in Archaeological Method and Theory. Orlando, Florida: Academic Press. pp. 63–111.
- Yellen, J.; Harpending, H. (1972). "Hunter-Gatherer Populations and Archaeological Inference". World Archaeology. 4 (2): 244–253. doi:10.1080/00438243.1972.9979535. PMID 16468220.
- Yellen, J. (1977). Archaeological Approaches to the Present. New York: Academic Press. ISBN 978-0-12-770350-3.
