= Sterility =

Sterile or sterility may refer to:

- Asepsis, a state of being free from biological contaminants
- Sterile (archaeology), a sediment deposit which contains no evidence of human activity
- Sterilization (microbiology), any process that eliminates or kills all forms of life or removes them from an item or a field
- Sterility (physiology), an inability of a living organism to effect sexual reproduction
  - Infertility, a medical condition which prevents a person, an animal or a plant from bearing children, especially through natural means
- Sterile Records, a record label which was formed by Nigel Ayers and Caroline K of the post-industrial music group Nocturnal Emissions in London in 1979

== See also ==
- Sterilization (disambiguation)
