= Intellectual Property Issues in Cultural Heritage project =

Cultural heritage research initiative

The Intellectual Property Issues in Cultural Heritage (IPinCH) Project is a seven-year international research initiative based at Simon Fraser University, in British Columbia, Canada. IPinCH's work explores the rights, values, and responsibilities of material culture, cultural knowledge, and the practice of heritage research. The project is directed by Dr. George P. Nicholas (Simon Fraser University), co-developed with Julie Hollowell (Indiana University) and Kelly Bannister (University of Victoria) and is funded by the Social Sciences and Humanities Research Council of Canada's (SSHRC) major collaborative research initiatives (MCRI) program.

IPinCH is an international collaboration of scholars, students, heritage professionals, community members, policy makers, and Indigenous organizations. The Research Team includes fifty-one leading scholars and professionals, one hundred and three Associates, sixteen Fellows, and thirty partnering organizations, representing Canada, Australia, United States, New Zealand, Italy, Japan, South Africa, Germany, and Switzerland. The project's organizational partners range from the World Intellectual Property Organization (WIPO), to Parks Canada, to Indigenous groups including the Penobscot Nation of Maine and the Moriori of Rekohu (Chatham Islands, New Zealand).

The project serves as both a practical resource and a network of support for communities and researchers engaged in cultural heritage work. Topics of research include the theoretical, ethical, and practical implications of commodification, appropriation, and other about the past, and how these may affect communities, researchers, and other stakeholders.

== Purpose ==
=== Project Description ===
The 7-year project began in 2008 with a $2.5 million grant from the Major Collaborative Research Initiatives program of Canada's Social Sciences and Humanities Research Council. About one-fourth of the project budget is reserved for student fellowships and research support, and one-fourth for community-based heritage research for case studies related to the project themes.

The IPinCH project initially had three components:

- Community Initiatives
- Working Groups
- Knowledge Base

As of March 2016, eight of the twelve community initiatives have been completed and the final reports are available on the IPinCH website (for details on IPinCH's Community Initiatives, please see below). To accommodate broadening research interests and developments, IPinCH Working Groups have been reconceptualized as Research Themes (see section below on Research Themes). The knowledge base (KB), an online searchable database and archive containing scholarly and popular articles, documents and tools created by communities, global case studies, research protocols and legislation, and resources created by the IPinCH project, has been retired from the IPinCH website. A selection of KB material is available within Simon Fraser University's Institutional Repository Summit.

== Community-based Initiatives / Special Initiatives ==
IPinCH values a collaborative approach and employs Community-Based Participatory Research (CBPR) methods that engage the community in all aspects of the research process. In the CBIs, communities determine the research goals, which form for the foundation for the initiative, including the practical and theoretical outputs. After community review, the results of these initiatives will be made available to partner organizations and stakeholders, in order to assist them in refining their own policies and approaches.

Key features of a CBPR methodology include:

- A collaborative approach that engages the community or organization in all aspects of the research process—from development of research questions and research design to conducting the research, designing outputs, and disseminating results;
- Research goals that prioritize community needs and result in direct community benefits;
- Projects that contribute to community capacity building and to sustainable and more equitable relations between the community and outside researchers, promote respect for local values, and address mistrust, inequity, and similar issues in conventional research.

Twelve community initiatives received funding from IPinCH and a further five Special Initiatives have also been approved. The community initiatives address a range of pressing cultural heritage topics:

- A Case of Access: Inuvialuit Engagement with the Smithsonian's MacFarlane Collection

The MacFarlane Collection is a collection of 550 Inuvialuit items bought by Hudson's Bay Company trader Roderick MacFarlane in the mid-1800s for the Smithsonian Institution in Washington, D.C. Inuvialuit elders, youth, cultural experts, anthropologists and museum curators shared with one another their respective knowledge about the museum collection and documented the process. The project has encouraged interaction and engagement by the Inuvialuit with the objects in the MacFarlane Collection, supported by the creation of a virtual exhibit and searchable archive of the collection.

- The History and Contemporary Practices of the Hopi Cultural Preservation Office

This case study focuses on the differences between Hopi notions of navoti ("traditional knowledge") and Euro-American understandings of intellectual property, and the implications of this difference in terms of managing cultural knowledge resources. This case study is working towards developing an official cultural heritage management guide for the Hopi Cultural Preservation Office and the Hopi Tribe.

- Yukon First Nations Heritage Values and Heritage Resource Management

This community initiative seeks understandings of heritage values from three participating Yukon First Nations: the Champagne & Aishihik First Nations, the Carcross-Tagish First Nation, and the Ta'an Kwach'än Council. This project will explore how the values of Yukon First Nations towards heritage resources differ from Western understandings, and will articulate and document what Indigenous heritage management practices look like on a practical level.

=== Special Initiatives ===
- Special Initiative — Did Tlingit and Haida people eat sea otters during the pre-contact period? An issue of intellectual property and cultural heritage
- Special Initiative — Managing and Protecting Inuit Cultural Heritage in Nunavut
- Special Initiative — Tracing Roots: a Documentary with and about Delores Churchill
- Special Initiative — Traditional Knowledge Licensing and Labeling Website 1.0
- Special Initiative — Ainu Conceptions of Cultural and Natural Heritage

== Research Themes ==
Integrating research findings and knowledge from our Community-Based Initiatives and other sources, the IPinCH Research Themes explore unique questions relating to intellectual property and heritage. Each group is led by at least two team members, as Research Theme Co-Chairs. Membership in these groups is open to all associated students, partnering organization representatives, co-investigators, associates, collaborators, research assistants, steering committee members, and community representatives.

- Commodifications of Cultural Heritage

How can processes of commodification be both harmful and beneficial? What tools and strategies can Indigenous communities and scholars use to deal with commodification concerns and opportunities? This theme covers complex topics such as the role of government and legislation in regulating cultural commodification, whether commodification can benefit disempowered communities, and the impact of treating human remains as commodities, whether in medical science or museums. Research theme co-chairs: Sven Ouzman (University of Pretoria) and Solen Roth (University of British Columbia).

- Community-Based Cultural Heritage Research (CBCHR)

There is an ongoing need for background information and case studies to help students and scholars think through the implications of community-based work. This theme also amalgamates resources to help foster balanced and mutually beneficial relationships between academic and community researchers and promote fair and culturally-appropriate uses of intellectual property. Research theme chairs: Kelly Bannister (University of Victoria), Julie Hollowell (Indiana University), Ian Lilley (University of Queensland), and John R. Welch (Simon Fraser University).

== Awards and recognitions ==
The Intellectual Property Issues has been the recipient of numerous notable awards and recognitions:

- 2007 Major Collaborative Research Initiative Grant awarded for "Intellectual Property Issues in Cultural Heritage: Theory, Practice, Policy, and Ethics". Social Sciences and Humanities Research Council
- 2013 Connections Grant for "Indigenous Peoples, Cultural Commodifications, and Self-Determination." Social Sciences and Humanities Research Council.
- 2013 Partnership Impact Award for "Intellectual Property Issues in Cultural Heritage Project." Social Sciences and Humanities Research Council
- 2015 Connections Grant for "Exploring the (Re-) Construction of Identity at the Interface of Biology and Culture." Social Sciences and Humanities Research Council
- 2015 Simon Fraser University President's Dream Colloquium Award for "Protecting Indigenous Cultural Heritage: Emergent Policy and Practice"

== See also ==
- Appropriation (sociology)
- Anthropology
- Archaeology
- Commodification
- Cultural Heritage
- Intellectual Property
