= Natural (archaeology) =

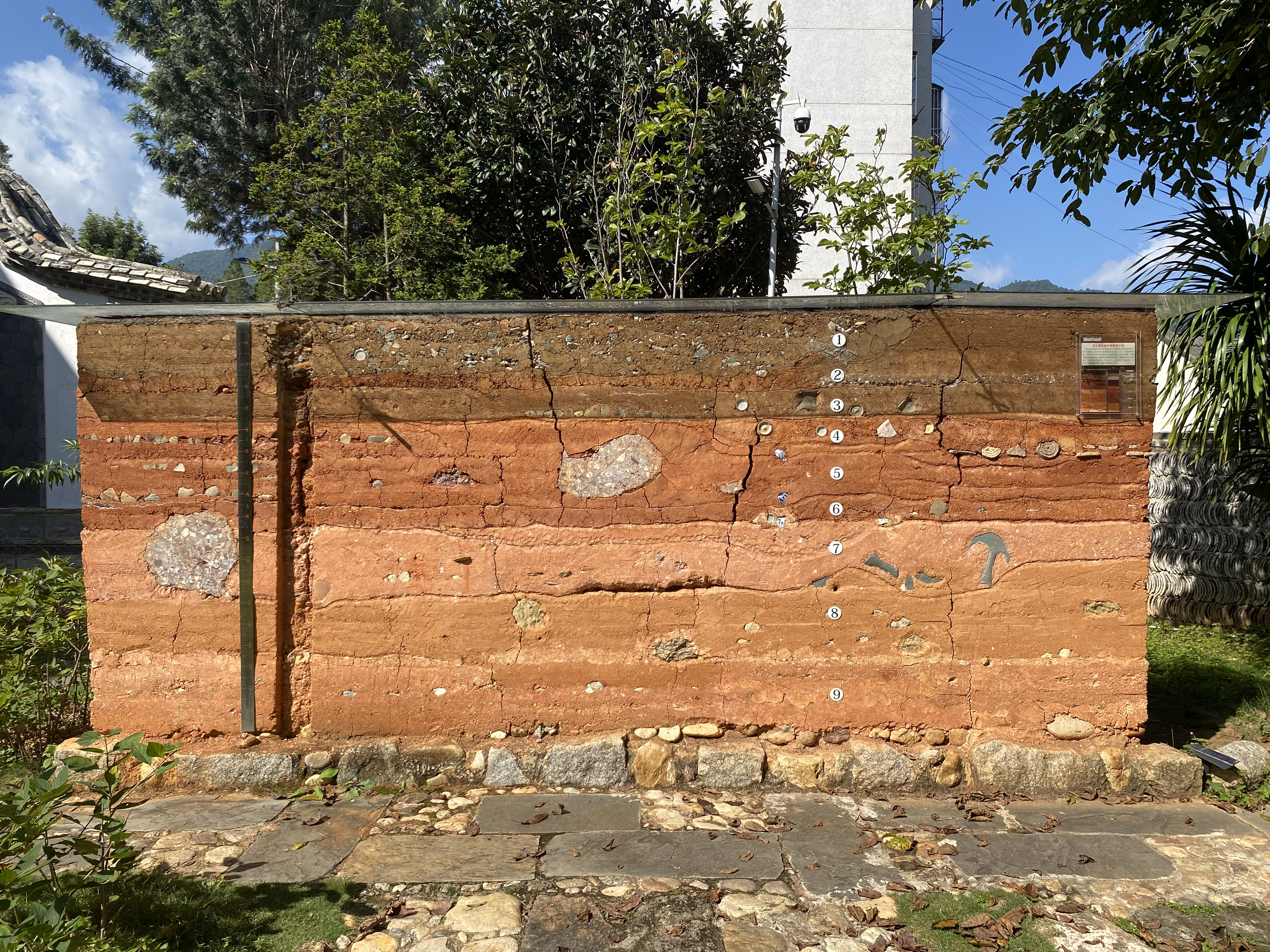
An archaeology natural layer exhibit at Lincang Archaeological Museum, Yunnan, China

In archaeology, natural is a term to denote a layer (stratum) in the stratigraphic record where there is no evidence of human impact on the environment. While there may be "natural" layers interbedded with archaeologically interesting layers, such as when a site was abandoned for long periods between occupations, the top (or horizon) of the natural layer below which there is no anthropogenic activity on site, and thus where the archaeological record begins, is the point to terminate digging. Usually it is the underlying geological makeup of the site that was formed by geologic processes. It is the goal of complete excavation to remove the entirety of the archaeological record all the way to the "natural", leaving only the natural deposits of pre-human activity on site.

If the excavation is related to development, the impact assessment may stipulate excavation will cease at a certain depth, because the nature of the development will not disturb remains below a certain level. Such an excavation may not reach a natural or sterile layer.

== Issues of definition ==
Natural is becoming a blurred term in archaeology due to an increased understanding by researchers of natural processes. In addition, through the development of geoarchaeology, scholars believe the natural landscape has a bearing on interpretation of subsequent human activity on any given site. As geoarchaeology continues to influence the interpretation of processes that occur within the archaeological record, the term "natural" has become less useful.

Natural can be a relative term. On urban sites, where research interests may make a detailed examination of the earliest part of the record impractical, rudimentary human or prehistoric activity may go unrecorded, as opposed to an equivalent horizon on a rural site for which the study team's agenda is to look for prehistoric evidence. Chemical and soil process over time often obscure and cause decomposition of cultural materials, and thus a human-occupied layer may look natural. Additionally, early prehistoric tools were manufactured from natural materials, such as bone, stone and fiber; they do not stand out as clearly as metal, glass and plastic. The effect of decompositional processes is that the older an archaeological deposit is, the more it will appear similar to the underlying geology. For some archaeologists, a basic rule of thumb is "the greater the contrast a context has with the natural, the younger it is." Similarly, United States prehistoric archaeologists often rely on significantly diminished counts of lithic flake debitage to assess the excavation unit's trend toward natural stratigraphy. While a trend may be recognized, a stratum is not called natural or sterile, unless it is void of cultural materials.
