= List of archaeological excavations by date =

This is a list of significant archaeological expeditions by date, which include first excavations at important sites, or expeditions that uncovered important objects.

== 1500s ==
- Pompeii - 1599 - Domenico Fontana called when the digging of an underground channel to divert the river Sarno ran into ancient walls covered with paintings and inscriptions.

== 1600s ==
- Ur - 1625 - Pietro Della Valle noted bricks with cuneiform writing and stone seals at the site of Ur.

== 1700s ==
- Julliberrie's Grave - 1702 - Heneage Finch

== 1800s ==
=== 1810s ===
- Babylon - 1811–12 - Claudius Rich

=== 1840s ===
- Dur-Sharrukin (Knorsabad) - 1842 - Paul-Émile Botta
- Ninevah - 1843 - Paul-Émile Botta
- Ninevah - 1845 - Austen Henry Layard
- Dur-Sharrukin (Knorsabad) - 1847 - Austen Henry Layard found Sennacherib's palace, and the library of Ashurbanipal

=== 1850s ===
- Larsa - 1850 - William Loftus
- Nippur - 1851 - Austen Henry Layard
- Borsippa - 1854 - Henry Creswicke Rawlinson
- Eridu - 1855 - John George Taylor

=== 1870s ===
- Troy - 1871-1879 - Heinrich Schliemann conducted two excavations at the site, determining that the city pre-dated the Classical era

=== 1880s ===
- Sippar - 1880-81 - Hormuzd Rassam
- Sippar-Amnanum - Hormuzd Rassam
- Tell Zurghul - 1887 - Robert Koldewey
- Lagash - 1887 - Robert Koldewey
- Great Serpent Mound - 1887-89 - Frederic Ward Putnam

=== 1890s ===
- Delphi - 1892 - Theophile Homolle, French School of Archaeology

== 1900s ==
=== 1900s ===
- Knossos - 1900 - Arthur Evans
- Shuruppak - 1902 - Robert Koldewey and Friedrich Delitzsch
- Gezer - 1902-09 - R.A.S. Macalister
- Adab - 1903-05 - Edgar James Banks
- Girsu - 1903-09 - Gaston Cros

=== 1910s ===
- Tell al-'Ubaid - Henry Hall

=== 1920s ===
- Ngaut Ngaut (also called Devon Downs) - Norman Tindale
- Mohenjo-daro - Kashinath Narayan Dikshit in 1924–25 and John Marshall in 1925–26
- Jemdet Nasr - Stephen Langdon

=== 1930s ===
- Sutton Hoo - Basil Brown
- Eshnunna - Henri Frankfort
- Khafajah - Henri Frankfort

=== 1940s ===
- Tell Uqair - Seton Lloyd

=== 1960s ===
- Masada - Yigael Yadin
- Tel Arad - Yohanan Aharoni

=== 1990s ===
- Marad - 1990 - Excavations led by Na'el Hannoon

== 2000s ==
- Tulul al-Baqarat - 2008-10 - Ayad Mahir Mahmud

=== 2010s ===
- Tell Khaiber - 2013-17
