= Glacial archaeology =

Study of human artifacts preserved in ice

Glacial archaeology, or ice patch archaeology, is a new field in which artifacts emerge through melting ice as a result of climate change. These artifacts are usually well-preserved (due to their encasement in ice), but decay quickly once exposed to the elements. One of the first such discoveries was made by hikers in 1991, with Ötzi. Such artifacts have ranged from hundreds to thousands of years in age. There are few researchers who specialize in this field, leading to concerns that valuable artifacts are continually being lost. Discoveries provide evidence for various human activities, such as evolution in hunting methods or materials used domestically.

== Locations ==
Glacial artifacts are usually found in mountain ranges. Alaska receives funding through the Inflation Reduction Act, which it uses to coordinate efforts between indigenous peoples, park archeologists, and federal agencies to preserve emerging artifacts. They have searched several national parks in Alaska with Washington State University. Some artifacts discovered in the state have been found in Lake Clark and Wrangell-St. Elias. The Yukon Ice Patches have provided evidence for early metallurgy in arrowheads used by indigenous hunters. Textiles believed to be from either the Viking or medieval period have been discovered at Lundbreen. Another artifact discovered in Norway were wooden skis with reindeer lining.

== See also ==
- Archaeological looting
