= Sterilization =

Sterilization may refer to:

- Sterilization (microbiology), killing or inactivation of micro-organisms
- Soil steam sterilization, a farming technique that sterilizes soil with steam in open fields or greenhouses
- Sterilization (medicine), a medical method that renders a human unable to reproduce
- Neutering, the surgical sterilization of animals
- Chemosterilant, a chemical compound that causes sterility
- Sterilization (economics), central bank operations aimed at neutralizing foreign exchange operations' impact on domestic money supply, or offset adverse consequences of large capital flows

== See also ==
- Sterility (physiology)
