= Anne Clarke (archaeologist) =

Australian archaeologist and heritage specialist

Professor Anne (Annie) Clarke FAHA

Academic background
- Education: Australian National University
- Thesis: Winds of Change: an archaeology of contact in the Groote Eylandt Archipelago, Northern Territory.

Academic work
- Institutions: University of Sydney

Anne (Annie) Clarke FAHA is an Australian archaeologist and heritage specialist. She is a professor of archaeology and heritage at the University of Sydney. Clarke is a leading scholar in Australian archaeology, both historical and Aboriginal, as well as critical heritage studies. She has specialisms in archaeobotany, contact archaeology and rock art.

== Education ==
Clarke obtained a BA (hons) from the Institute of Archaeology, University of London in 1980. In 1989 she obtained a MA from the University of Western Australia with a thesis titled An Analysis of Archaeobotanical Data from Two Sites in Kakadu National Park, Northern Territory. She obtained a PhD in 1996 from the Australian National University, supervised by Rhys Jones, Mike Smith and Matthew Spriggs. Her thesis, titled Winds of Change: an archaeology of contact in the Groote Eylandt Archipelago, Northern Territory explored the dynamics of contact and colonialism between Indigenous people living in the Groote Eylandt archipelago, Macassan traders and later European colonists. It also represented and early model of engaged, community archaeology, as Clarke carried out her fieldwork in collaboration with the local Aboriginal communities of Groote Eylandt.

== Career ==
After completing her PhD, Clarke was employed by the Australian National University, first as a post-doctoral fellow and lecturer. In 2003, she was appointed as a lecturer in heritage studies at the University of Sydney. Over the course of her career, Clarke has held a number of grants, including a large number of Australian Research Council Linkage projects. From 2006 to 2009, Clarke (along with colleagues Robin Torrence of the Australian Museum and Jude Philp of the Macleay Museum) directed the ARC-funded "Producers and Collectors: Uncovering the Role of Indigenous Agency in the Formation of Museum Collections". From 2012 to 2015 she was lead Chief Investigator on the project "The archaeology and history of quarantine" that investigated the Sydney Quarantine Station at North Head. She is currently involved with two ARC Linkage projects: "Reconstructing museum specimen data through the pathways of global commerce" led by Jude Philp and "Heritage of the air: how aviation transformed Australia" led by Tracey Ireland of the University of Canberra. For the latter project, she is analysing material culture related to aviation held in a number of collections, including by Qantas and the SFO Museum at San Francisco Airport.

Clarke is best known for her work on the archaeology of cross-cultural exchange, community archaeology and cultural heritage. Her work on Groote Eylandt focussed scholarly attention on paintings of Macassan praus in Aboriginal Australian rock art. She applied these methods to the study of graffiti made at the Sydney Quarantine Station by people interned there in the 19th and 20th centuries. This research led to the 2016 publication of the book Stories from the sandstone: quarantine inscriptions from Australia's immigrant past (co-authored with Peter Hobbins and Ursula Frederick) that won the NSW community and regional history prize at the 2017 NSW Premier's History Awards. In recent years, Clarke has returned to Groot Eylandt where she has been working with the local community to develop educational programs, repatriation protocols and future archaeological research projects.

She was elected a Fellow of the Australian Academy of the Humanities in 2023.

== Selected publications ==
=== Books ===
- Brown, S., A. Clarke and U.K. Frederick (eds) (2015). Object Stories. artifacts and archaeologists, (San Francisco: Left Coast Press).
- Clarke, A. and U.K. Frederick (eds) (2014) “Signs of the Times: Archaeological approaches to historical and contemporary graffiti”. Themed Section, Australian Archaeology 78. https://doi.org/10.1080/03122417.2014.11681999
- Harrison, R., S. Byrne, and A. Clarke (eds) (2013). Reassembling the Collection: Ethnographic Museums and Indigenous Agency. (Santa Fe, NM: SAR Press).
- Hobbins, P., U. K. Frederick and A. Clarke (2016) Stories from the Sandstone. Quarantine Inscriptions from Australia’s Immigrant Past (Crows Nest, Arbon Publishing).
- Torrence, R. and A. Clarke (eds) (2000). The Archaeology of Difference: Negotiating cross-cultural engagements in Oceania. One World Archaeology 38, (London: Routledge).

=== Articles and book chapters ===
- Clarke, A. (2000), “Time, Tradition and Transformation: the archaeology of intercultural encounters on Groote Eylandt, Northern Australia” in R. Torrence and A. Clarke (eds) The Archaeology of Difference: Negotiating cross-cultural engagements in Oceania. One World Archaeology 38, (London: Routledge), 142–181. https://doi.org/10.4324/9780203298817
- Clarke, A. (2002). “The Ideal and the real: cultural and personal transformations of archaeological research on Groote Eylandt, Northern Australia”. World Archaeology 34 (2): 249–264. https://doi.org/10.1080/0043824022000007080
- Clarke, A. (2000). ‘”The Moormans Trowsers’: Aboriginal and Macassan Interactions and the Changing Fabric of Indigenous Social Life’”. In S. O’Connor and P. Veth (eds) East of Wallace’s Line. (Rotterdam: A.A. Balkema) Modern Quaternary Research in Southeast Asia 16: 315-335.
- Clarke, A. (1994). “Romancing the Stones: the cultural construction of an archaeological landscape”, Archaeology in Oceania 29: 1–15. https://www.jstor.org/stable/40386978
- Clarke, A., S. Colley and M. Gibbs (eds) (2012) Historical and contemporary archaeology in the Sydney Basin. Archaeology in Oceania 47 (2). https://www.jstor.org/stable/23265072
- Clarke, A. and U.K. Frederick (2016). ‘That was Then, This is Now: An Introduction to Contemporary Archaeology in Australia’. In U.K. Frederick and A. Clarke (eds) That was Then, This is Now: Contemporary Archaeology and Material Cultures in Australia. (Newcastle upon Tyne: Cambridge Scholars Publishing), 1–13.
- Clarke, A. and U.K. Frederick (2011), “Making a sea change: Rock art, archaeology and the enduring legacy of Frederick McCarthy's research on Groote Eylandt” in M. Thomas and M. Neale (eds) Exploring the Legacy of the 1948 American-Australian Scientific Expedition to Arnhem Land, (Canberra: ANU e-press), 135–155.
- Clarke, A., U.K. Frederick, & P. Hobbins (2017). 'No complaints': counter-narratives of immigration and detention in graffiti at North Head Immigration Detention Centre, Australia 1973–76. World Archaeology. https://doi.org/10.1080/00438243.2017.1334582
- Clarke, A. and A. Paterson (eds) (2003) Cross-Cultural Archaeology: An introduction. Archaeology in Oceania 38 (2). https://doi.org/10.1002/j.1834-4453.2003.tb00528.x
- Torrence, R. and A. Clarke (2016). "Excavating ethnographic collections: negotiations and cross-cultural exchange in Papua New Guinea". World Archaeology 48:2, 181-195 https://doi.org/10.1080/00438243.2016.1146161
