= Braiding knowledge =

Braiding knowledge is a research framework that combines traditional knowledge with "Western" science to address contemporary issues.

== Organizations ==
The following organizations center the use of braiding knowledge in their mission statements.

=== Center for Braiding Indigenous Knowledges and Science ===
The Center for Braiding Indigenous Knowledges and Science (CBIKS) was founded in 2023 with funding by the National Science Foundation’s Science and Technology Centers: Integrative Partnerships program by co-principal investigators: Sonya Atalay, Ora Marek-Martinez, Bonnie Newsom, and Jon Woodruff. The Center is located on the MIT campus with eight regional hubs across the U.S. and in Canada, Aotearoa New Zealand, and Australia. Research is fully community-driven and in full collaboration with community partners at all education levels. CBIKS is currently directed by Sonya Atalay.

=== Braiding Knowledge Project ===
The Braiding Knowledge Project, founded in 2021, is led by Melissa Tehee, Breanne Litts, and Rogelio Cardona-Rivera between Utah State University and the University of Utah with funding from the Spencer Foundation and the National Science Foundation.

=== Braiding Knowledges Canada (BKC) ===
BKC is a Canadian not-for-profit corporation established in 2019 that promotes decolonizing practices through place-based, community-driven environmental research. The corporation is supported by a five-year grant from the Government of Canada’s Strategic Science Fund Program from 2024 to 2029. BKC is based out of the University of Alberta, Edmonton, Canada.
