= Prehistoric Women =

Prehistoric Women may refer to:

- Prehistoric Women (1950 film), a low-budget fantasy adventure film
- Prehistoric Women (1967 film), a British fantasy adventure film

== See also ==
- Women in prehistory
