= Transgender archaeology =

Approach to archaeological theory and practice

Transgender archaeology is an approach to the study of archaeology which focuses on critiquing dominant views of archaeology rooted in binary gender, sex, and expression. This approach diversifies cisgender approaches to archaeological practice. In 2016, a special issue of the Journal of Archaeological Method and Theory was dedicated to papers that challenged a binary approach to gender. Researchers such as Mary Weismantel have discussed how understanding past gender diversity can support contemporary transgender rights, but have called for transgender archaeology to "not re-populate the ancient past ... but to offer a subtler appreciation of cultural variation". Jan Turek, writing in 2016, described how archaeological interpretation can be limited since "current gender categories do not always correspond with those of a former reality". Transgender theory provides an avenue of empowerment especially for those with multiple marginalized identities.

== Theory ==
Transgender archaeology does not search to find transgender people in the past, or to understand the origins of being transgender; rather, it seeks to critically challenge current assumptions in archaeological discourse. The gender and sex binary employed by anthropologists and archaeologists is rooted in Western ideas which erase the fluidity of gender and sex today and by people in the past. According to Mary Weismantel, when archaeologists engage in modern binary gender interpretations and sex beliefs and apply them towards people in the past, they are furthering the beliefs of the natural truth of the sexed body. This may cause harm to transgender and gender nonconforming people as it furthers invalidates their identity and aligns with transphobic beliefs.

This subfield is deeply rooted in Transgender theory which arose from Queer theory. Queer theory seeks out to understand the “others” in the past who do not fall within the dominant culture. Transgender theory goes beyond queer and feminist theory by "explicitly incorporating ideas of the fluidly embodied, socially constructed, and self-constructed aspects of social identity, along with the dynamic interaction and integration of these aspects of identity within the narratives of lived experiences". Transgender theory arose to directly challenge Queer theory in its beliefs beyond the gender and sex binary. Transgender theory advocates for those who are "either/or" and "both/neither" which describes gender and sexuality beyond the binary. Rather, it advocates for the diversity among gender expression and experiences to create a better picture of people’s lived experiences. Intersectional identities, lived experiences, and socially and self-constructed ideas of self are all fundamental themes in Transgender theory.

== Understanding past societies ==
Transgender archaeology draws on and can be applied to a range of disciplines in the field, including figurative analysis, bioarchaeology, and others. For figurines from coastal Ecuador, many of these objects combine both masculine and feminine attributes through either physical characteristics or dress. These figures, interpreted as potentially non-binary or transgender, are found in the Tumaco-La Tolita culture, as well as from Bahía and Jama Coaque cultures. Similarly, analysis of late Bronze Age figurines from Knossos demonstrated that for both faience figurines and ivory bull-leaper figurines, "sexed differences are not clearly marked in a binary fashion". Alberti argues that any sexed differences are highly dependent on the socio-religious context of the figurines, rather than specifically gendered identities. The importance of context is also echoed in work on non-binary and intersex visibility in Roman archaeology.

Bioarchaeological estimates of sex are based on identification of potentially dimorphic features, yet neither gender nor biological sex are entirely binary categories. However, some characteristics that are often viewed as sexually dimorphic may not, depending on the age of the individual whose body is being analysed. For example, cranial robustness tends to be associated as a male characteristic, yet it can also be considered a female characteristic because the effects of menopause can produce the same. Additionally, the categorization of sex uses a spectrum of female, probable female, ambiguous sex, male and probable male. This is dependent on the confidence of the researcher in the estimation, rather than focus on the possibility of "sex-gender fluidity" in the past. Transgender archaeology advocates to look beyond the ideas of gender and sex today to better understand how different cultures viewed sex and gender. The current sexing of bodies based on remains has been critiqued of being too focused on the sex binary based on Western ideas of gender and sex. Approximately 1.7% of people born today are classified as intersex which do not fit into the dimorphism of sex currently employed. Absolute sexual dimorphism between males and females does not exists as there is overlap and variation among sexual dimorphism.

Studies that support interpretations of gender fluidity include ones on pre-Columbian Maya burial practices, multiple Hidatsa genders during the pre-Columbian era, mortuary practices in Chumash communities, communities during the Copper Age on the Black Sea coast in Bulgaria, the excavation and interpretation of a 5,000-year-old person by the Czech Archaeological Society, the reassessment of grave Bj.581 at Birka, non-binary gender expression in Inuit cultures, Roman Galli, a 1,000-year-old person who likely had Klinefelter syndrome from Finland, the life of Elagabalus, prehistoric burials in Europe, historical archaeology around the Engabao community in Ecuador, material cultures in medieval England, dress in eighteenth-century Ireland, and many others. The Lady of Vix is the name assigned to the main burial at the Vix site in northern Burgundy. The sex of the individual was highly contested as their funerary objects are often associated with men, but the individual was sexed using their skeletal remains to likely be female.

== Nonbinary archaeology ==
Researchers have begun to recognize the role and presence of nonbinary people in the past largely using a transgender archaeological approach and lens. Although some nonbinary people today consider themselves under the transgender umbrella, not all do. It is important to theorize nonbinary spaces and identities in the past to adequately describe and portray the variety and diversity among human culture and life. Examples of nonbinary people have been identified in Ancient Chinese culture, specifically during the Han dynasty, and Greco-Roman culture where eunuchs had a specific role in society occupying a third gender. Both cultures provide language and myths regarding nonbinary or gender nonconforming peoples which provide avenues to challenge current ideas of gender employed onto past societies.

== Mary Weismantel ==
The field has largely been shaped by the works of Mary Weismantel who has advocated for Transgender theory in archaeology. Weismantel advocates for taking a “transgender rampage” throughout prehistory to critique past assumptions and societal norms placed onto past culture and peoples. This approach has had little application in the field of archaeology especially compared to Queer theory .

== Activism ==
Archaeologists have advocated for transgender rights and express concern on how modern transphobia and exclusion misrepresents the diversity of gender, sex, and expression in the past. The Black Trowel Collective, a group of anarchist archaeologists, have advocated for transgender archaeology and theory to advocate beyond current gender and sex binaries. They reinforce the notion that the work archaeologists do is inherently political and affects queer and transgender people in the modern day which are facing historic levels of oppression and violence against them. They also advocate for creating a safer space in the field for gender nonconforming and transgender students and colleagues which is not currently the case.

== See also ==
- Queer archaeology
- Gender archaeology
- Red Lady of Paviland
