= Feminist archaeology =

Subdiscipline of archaeology

Feminist archaeology employs a feminist perspective in interpreting past societies. It often focuses on gender, but also considers gender in tandem with other factors, such as sexuality, race, or class. Feminist archaeology has critiqued the uncritical application of modern, Western norms and values to past societies. It is additionally concerned with increasing the representation of women in the discipline of archaeology, and reducing androcentric bias within the field.

Feminist archaeology has expanded in recent years to include intersectional analyses, such as Black Feminist archaeology, Indigenous archaeology, and post-colonial archaeology. It also began to pay more attention to household studies, the study of masculinity, and the study of sexuality.

== Emergence of feminist archaeology ==
Feminist archaeology initially emerged in the late 1970s and early 80s, along with other objections to the epistemology espoused by the processual school of archaeological thought, such as symbolic and hermeneutic archaeologies. Margaret Conkey and Janet Spector's 1984 paper Archaeology and the Study of Gender summed up the feminist critique of the discipline at that time: that archaeologists were unproblematically overlaying modern-day, Western gender norms onto past societies, for example in the sexual division of labor; that contexts and artifacts attributed to the activities of men, such as projectile point production and butchering at kill sites, were prioritized in research time and funding; and that the very character of the discipline was constructed around masculine values and norms. For example, women were generally encouraged to pursue laboratory studies instead of fieldwork (although there were exceptions throughout the history of the discipline) and the image of the archaeologist was centered on the rugged, masculine, “cowboy of science”. In 1991, two publications marked the emergence of feminist archaeology on a large scale: the edited volume Engendering Archaeology, which focused on women in prehistory, and a thematic issue of the journal Historical Archaeology, which focused on women and gender in post-Columbian America. Outside the Americas, feminist archaeology enjoyed an earlier emergence and greater support among the greater archaeological community.

=== Early feminist studies ===
Notable challenges raised by early feminist archaeologists have concerned hunting and stone tool-making, among many other topics. The Man the Hunter paradigm in anthropology, named after a symposium given in the 1960s by some of the most prominent names in archaeology, bifurcated the hominid sexual division of labor along male and female sexes. Males were in charge of hunting, and presumably through this activity developed important evolutionary traits, such as increased brain size. Meanwhile, females stayed at home and raised the young. An assumption behind this model is that women were constrained from certain activities due to decreased mobility resulting from pregnancy and their role in raising young children. This model has been critiqued by feminist anthropologists, as underplaying the evolutionary importance of women in favor of portraying them strictly as passive objects of reproduction and nothing more. Adrienne Zihlman, tracing the evolutionary achievements ascribed to males as hunters, pointed out that female gathering activities could just as easily account for such adaptations.

Joan Gero challenged androcentric explanations of tool-making on several levels. First, the common assumption that tool-making was almost exclusively associated with men was almost certainly false; at the least, women were far more likely to produce their own tools as needed in domestic contexts rather than wait for a man to come along and do it for them. The argument behind this assumption, that men possess greater upper-body strength, was dismissed by Gero, who pointed out physical strength is not an imperative quality in someone skilled at making stone tools. Additionally, Gero pointed out the great emphasis in research time and money towards studies concerned with the most “masculine” of stone tools, such as projectile points, while stone tools likely made and used by women, for example utilized flakes, have been relatively ignored.

== Feminist and gender archaeologies ==
Since the early feminist critiques of archaeology, gender has gained enormous popularity within the discipline. The label “feminist” has not been embraced by most archaeologists, however. A split between gender and feminist archaeologies formed during the 1990s. Gender archaeology has become a wide umbrella, including, but not limited to, feminist work that employs queer theory, practice theory, and performance theory, among others. Many archaeologists engaged in gender research avoid the label of “feminist,” largely due to the perceived negative connotations of the word. Others within the discipline have an oversimplified understanding of feminist archaeology's history and aims, and as a consequence mistakenly conflate it with postmodernism. Some archaeologists have argued against the continued incorporation of feminist thought, which is inherently political, into archaeological studies of gender. Few works in gender archaeology have actively engaged in challenging patriarchal power structures beyond rectifying androcentric histories. Feminist archaeology engages in challenging and changing interpretive frameworks employed by archaeologists: “Feminism is a politics aimed at changing gender-based power relations.” Noted feminist philosopher Alison Wylie delineates several guidelines imperative for conducting feminist archaeology:

1. To propose research questions that address people oppressed by systems of inequality structured by gender, in order to change such conditions.
2. Feminist research should be grounded in the situated experience of women and other groups marginalized by conventional gender structures.
3. Researchers should be held accountable to those affected by their research; under no means should feminist research exploit others.
4. Feminist researchers should engage in self-reflexivity, recognizing their personal social positions, interests, and values, and discussing how these interact with their research.

In contrast, gender archaeology not employed by feminists lacks such characteristics. Gender is currently a common topic of study in archaeology among non-feminists. Such studies focus on identifying gendered activities and material culture and on the gender roles of past peoples, but do not present themselves in an overtly political way. Non-feminist archaeologists are less compelled to position themselves within their work, or reflect on how their position affects their work. Investigating gender independent of feminism, however, elides the aims of early studies and represents gender and sex in a conceptually deficient manner.

== Ongoing feminist contributions to archaeology ==
Feminist archaeologists continue to challenge archaeological norms and expand research into new intellectual territories. They argue for the incorporation of alternative forms of knowledge and representation; for example, black and Indigenous epistemologies have been employed by feminist archaeologists. There continues to be a feminist critique of the masculine character and organization of archaeology.

=== Alternative forms of knowledge and presentation ===
One important realm of research for feminist archaeologists, along with some non-feminists, is de-centering Westernized forms of history in favor of privileging alternative conceptions and interpretations of the past, and exploring non-traditional ways of conveying knowledge. A growing body of work involves involvement with descendant communities, giving them a voice in archaeological investigations and interpretations of the past. The public demand for allowing descendant communities a voice in the African Burial Ground controversy highlighted the importance of this kind of work. Parallels have been drawn between feminist archaeology and Indigenous archaeology, focusing on how both work to break down the male, white, middle-class, Western monopoly to accessing knowledge about the past. This type of work helps to de-center the privileged position of Western knowledge without removing its relevance.

Additionally, feminist archaeologists have engaged in the use of fiction to help access the past. This has taken the form of plays, as seen in Red-Light Voices, based on letters and diaries by early 20th-century prostitutes to explore prostitution. Another example is seen in Laurie Wilkie’s fictional worker involved in the Federal Writers' Project, interjected in her archaeological study of an African-American midwife in the post-emancipation South. Janet D. Spector interpreted the meaning behind a single artifact through a fictional narrative in What This Awl Means. Narrative has been argued as an effective means by which archaeologists can create multivocal and more broadly accessible interpretations and presentations. The use of storytelling “demonstrate[s] how narrative is a powerful tool for bringing texture, nuance, and humanity to women’s experiences as evidenced through archaeology”).

=== Intersectional analysis ===
A common analytical technique employed by feminist (and some non-feminist) archaeologists is intersectional analysis, which, following the assertions of black feminists leading third-wave feminism in the U.S., maintains that gender cannot be accessed by itself but must be studied in conjunction with other forms of identity. In historical archaeology the linkage between gender, race, and class has been increasingly explored, but other aspects of identity, notably sexuality, have been examined as well in relation to gender. Intersectional analysis has not been limited to feminist archaeology, as illustrated by the prevalent use of gender-race-class as a means of exploring identity by historical archaeologists. Although many such studies have focused on white, middle-class women of the recent Anglo-American past, the articulation of gender with other aspects of identity is starting to be applied to Native American women and African Americans. The work of Kathleen Deagan on Spanish colonial sites in the US and Caribbean has pioneered a movement of study of gender in the Spanish colonies. The use of black feminist work, which calls to attention the inherent connectivity between gender and class in the U.S. has been an important step in advancing the use of intersectional analysis in archaeology. The intersectional approach faced a lot of “oppositional consciousness” that intervened in the flow of hegemonic feminist theory” and challenges in crossing the boundaries and negotiating with the terms of belonging in the community.

=== Black Feminist Archaeology ===
Black Feminist Archaeology is relatively new within the discipline of archaeology, and has been predominantly led by Black women in historical North American contexts. It focuses on the intersection between race, gender, and class in the interpretation of the American archaeological record, and rejects the separation or prioritization of one or another form of oppression. Black Feminist Archeology is heavily inspired by Black Feminist Anthropology, with the addition of archaeological theory introduced to create a "purposefully coarse and textured analytical framework." This theoretical approach connects contemporary concepts of racism and sexism with the past, and draws connections between past influences and the way in which the past has influenced and shaped the present.

==== Black Feminist Archaeological Contributions ====
===== Prehistoric Archaeology =====
Archaeologist Kathleen Sterling proposes two ways that black feminist theory can be applied to archaeology outside of historical North American contexts: (1) by studying the Paleolithic people of Europe in a way that attempts to be cognizant of our interpretations of primitiveness, while also acknowledging that our conceptions of primitiveness are racially coded; and (2) by studying anatomically modern humans (AMH) and Neanderthals, and the way in which they interacted. Sterling provides an example for how Black feminist theory can be applied to the latter.

Though exact dates are contested and variable, it can be said that anatomically modern humans (AMH) and Neanderthals interacted and lived among one another for a sustained amount of time. The ways in which AMHs and Neanderthals were thought to have interacted are through cultural transmission and competition. This interaction of cultural transmission is thought to be seen through the Châtelperronian tool tradition, as well as the presence of worked ivory in Upper Paleolithic sites, both of which are assumed to be diffused from AMHs. This interpretation of the cultural interaction between AMHs and Neanderthals, Sterling claims, assumes that Neanderthals are an inferior race to the superior Cro-Magnons, and learned nothing from this species that evolved over thousands of years successfully. The other leading interaction, competition, leads to the idea that the Neanderthal extinction was caused by Cro-Magnons out-competing them, which again lines up with Sterling's assertion that this implies that Neanderthals were an inferior race.

However, new analyses have complicated this relationship. New finds of a collapsed shelter of mammoth bones, red ochre, and non-butchery marks on mammoth bones, dated before the arrival of AMHs to the area, suggest that Neanderthals were capable of performing this kind of symbolic activity without the influence or direction of AMHs. Another complicating factor is DNA evidence, that shows that there was substantial sexual interaction between the species of Homo across Eurasia. This DNA shows that interbreeding between these species was prevalent enough to continue to persist in modern genomes today, but not so much as to have overwhelming percentages in modern populations.

Unfortunately, little is known about the dynamics of these relationships between Neanderthals and AMHS. Citing a 2012 New York Times article, where Dr. Chris Stringer describes the inbreeding between Neanderthals and AMHs as “aggressive acts between competing human groups,” which he says are akin to modern day hunter-gatherer groups that have the same behavior, Sterling suggests that this reinforces tribal stereotypes. Ideas of the innateness of violence and primitiveness of men are also implied. Sterling juxtaposes this view of prehistoric competition with the sexual violence experienced by enslaved Black women in the United States, and the criminality imposed on relations between Black men and White women. Consensual interactions between people of different races was seen as a historical impossibly, and that woman were not granted sexual agency.

Still, competition does not explain the probabilities of infanticide, abortion, and abandonment of the children born from Neanderthal and AMH interaction, which again ignore the agency of women in these populations, Sterling claims. Instead of Neanderthals withering away from climatic violence, Sterling posits that they were rather absorbed into AMH communities because of their interbreeding and child rearing. This view echoes other theories about Neanderthal disappearance, but acknowledges their autonomy and agency as well, despite leading to their extinction as a species.

Sterling uses a Black Feminist framework to showcase how different aspects of life and identity intersect and impact areas of interest, and produce more complex understandings of prehistoric life.

===== Historical archaeology =====
Whitney Battle-Baptiste, a proponent of Black Feminist Archaeology (BFA), talks about the theories and methodology of Black Feminist Archaeology in her book Black Feminist Archaeology. According to Battle-Baptiste, BFA focuses on "the intersectionality of race, gender, and class" and the doubled or tripled form of oppression due to one's multiple identities. BFA researches into the past with the goal of connecting it to present-day racism and sexism. BFA seeks to combine traditional archaeology's strict material analysis with nearby historical and contemporary communities' cultural landscapes. Aided by these methods, Black Feminist Archaeology has the potential to diversify the questions asked and knowledge produced in archaeology. The Hermitage Plantation in Tennessee, Lucy Foster's homesite in Massachusetts, and W.E.B. Du Bois' boyhood homesite in Massachusetts are examples Battle-Baptiste used to demonstrate the Black Feminist Archaeological approach to historical sites.

The Hermitage Plantation belonged to the seventh president Andrew Jackson, which had more than 160 slaves. In her research, Battle-Baptiste not only examines the physical landscape of the Hermitage but also delves into the cultural meanings, socialization processes, and Black agency within the space. Exploring the domestic sphere with an emphasis on race, she demonstrates that the types of domestic works captive women did differ from those of the European women. Relying on elder generations' social memory, Battle-Baptiste suggests that home is not the "four walls of a twenty foot dwelling." It extends into larger environment to incorporate the yard, and it is a place for people "to regroup, to learn strategies of survival, find strength, and create thoughts of resistance."

First discovered in the 1940s by Adelaide and Ripley Bullen, the Lucy Foster Homestead was home to Lucy Foster, who was born in 1767 in Boston, Massachusetts. As a child, she was taken in by a wealthy family, the Foster’s, and provided a home, and in return the family was granted compensation from the parish, and gained a working hand in daily chores and tasks. She served as the only African in the household for 11 years, before another child, Sarah Gilbert, was taken in by the Foster’s. After the abolition of slavery in Massachusetts, it appears that Lucy stayed with Hannah Foster, the matriarch of the Foster family. Limitation and lack of opportunities in post-emancipation Massachusetts may have contributed to this decision. At the age of 24, Lucy was “warned” out town by a letter that read, “You are, in the Name of the Commonwealth of Massachusetts, directed to warn and give Notice unto Lucy a Negroe Woman formerly a Servant of Job Foster…” This was a common practice meant to reduce the populations of Black and Indigenous populations in New England. Two years passed without incident, and Lucy seems to have returned to Andover once again. At 26, she is said to have given a “Profession of Faith,” to the South Parish Congregational Church, and a month later, Peter, Lucy’s son, is baptized. Peter’s age, location of birth, and paternal relation is unknown. Following the death of Hannah Foster in 1812, Lucy was granted one cow, one hundred dollars, and an acre of her land, per the instructions in the will. This information comes before the fate of her own children, suggesting a degree of familiarity between Lucy and the Foster matriarch. Not much is known about Lucy following this, until her death in 1845

A point of contention in Lucy’s story for Battle-Baptiste is the question of her poverty, and how poverty shaped Lucy’s identity, or her identity was shaped by poverty. She suggests that, like many other African American women did at the time, Lucy likely continued to work service jobs and other kinds of manual labor, like cooking, laundry, and sewing, evidenced by the number of needles, thimbles, and buttons found in her material assemblage. In 1813, Lucy is listed on the Overseers of the Poor and remains listed there until her death in 1845. She was never told to abandon her property or move to an alms house. Battle-Baptiste questions what poverty looks like in the material record, and how that material record was interpreted in the 1940s by the Bullens. In terms of Lucy’s material record, she had a wide array of items, including pearlware, Chinese porcelain, red ware, whitewall, and more, totaling 113 vessels, suggesting that ideas of poverty are variable throughout time. As Battle-Baptiste reanalyzed Lucy Foster’s homestead, she envisioned Lucy as independent, respected, and placed in a system that negotiated her freedom, but still experienced a degree of restriction based on her identity. The assemblage found at Lucy Foster’s home could also be evidence of her relative social position in Andover. Due to her isolation, it is possible that her positioning was advantageous to night travelers, and that this could be evidence of her role in the anti-slavery movement and contribution to the Underground Railroad.

Despite the storied life that Lucy Foster lived, and the importance of her site as one of the first excavated African American sites in the United States, her story is not well known in archaeology, or in Massachusetts.

=== Household studies ===
Archaeological studies of domestic sites have been particularly affected by ongoing feminist work. The long-standing trend in archaeology to associate women with domestic spaces, placed in opposition to the association with men and “public” spaces, has been a continuous locus of feminist research. Since the advent of the new millennium, there has been a shift away from such dichotomized spatial separation of gender. In historical archaeology, feminist archaeologists have been crucial to widening the definition of what constitutes a household from a familial model based on Western norms, such as household archaeology projects studying brothels and fraternities. By engaging with broader household literature, archaeologists have begun to re-conceive household, long considered autonomous analytical units, as political spaces, occupied by social actors occupying different social positions shaped by gender, race, age, occupation, socioeconomic status, and so on.

=== Feminist archaeology and the study of masculinity ===
Feminist concern has been primarily with women; however, emerging concern with the exploration and intricacies of masculinities in archaeology is rising. Masculine identity constructs and social reproduction of normative masculinity are some of the topics that have been addressed by a limited number of archaeologists. This area of study in general, however, remains relatively unexplored.

Inspired by the feminist trend, some archaeologists began to reflect on Archaeology as a discipline itself. Feminist critics lists three types of androcentrism exists in archaeology: 1) focusing on presumed male roles such as hunter, warrior, chief, and farmers; 2) under-analyzing in activities/processes considered to be in the female domain by western tradition; 3) interpreting data "through the eyes of middle-age, middle-class, western white men." If androcentrism in archaeology is not addressed and if humans are not seen as gendered, archaeologists will miss the truth due to repeated reproduction of modern gender stereotypes. Following this trend, archaeologists challenge the hypothesis that, in ancient societies, women were always the gathers while men were the hunters. Maritime archaeology has also began to reflect on itself as a strongly masculine archaeology subfield. Oftentimes, maritime archaeology studies warfare, shipwrecks, and sea battles, leaving the social aspects of maritime life marginalized and unexplored. Maritime archaeologists interpretations of the pasts also fail to "acknowledge there are other ways to be male and female." Considering the vastness of sea and the great potential of maritime archaeology, scholar Jesse Ransley advocate for the queering of maritime archaeology.

=== Feminist archaeology and the study of sexuality ===
Before the 1990s, there was a lack of archaeological research that dealt with sexuality. Entering into the 2000s, more researchers apply feminist theory and queer theory to study reproduction management, sexual representations, sexual identities, prostitution, and the sexual politics of institutions. For example, B.L Voss challenges the St. Augustine Pattern in colonial period by applying postcolonial and poststructural feminist theories. She examines the applicability of St. Augustine Pattern from six aspects of life and concludes that this pattern reduces the complexity of colonial history.

== Impact of feminism in archaeology ==
Feminist archaeology has had a lasting impact on archaeology that continues to grow today. Through the implementation of feminist thought in archaeology, visibility of women, both in the past and in the present, has been steadily increasing. One of the biggest contributions from feminist archaeology is the revisitation of past cultural circumstances, which has led to the reevaluation of women’s roles and revealed situations where women were more present than previously thought.

That being said, there remains an issue where women's roles are indeed illuminated, but the roles and activities they performed are not engaged critically, and are, as Margaret Conkey says, "unproblematized." In addition, the reinterpretation of androcentrism into gynocentrism, as with naming ancient figurines as “goddesses,” misses the point of meaningful Feminist critique.

Despite the positive change affected on archaeology, feminist thought is still not as widely implemented into mainstream archaeology, and when it is, it is often done so by women. When gender is considered in archaeological analyses, it is often only one factor amid a myriad of others within a larger framework, not a central tenet.

Additionally, there has been a lack of crossover between mainstream feminist academia and archaeological theory, showcasing that feminist archaeology has not yet made the jump into mainstream feminist circles.

== See also ==
- Women in prehistory
- Marija Gimbutas
- Queer archeology

== Bibliography ==
- Gero, Joan M.; Conkey, Margaret w. (1991). Engendering Archaeology: Women and Prehistory. Wiley. p. 436. ISBN 9780631175018. JSTOR 41102554.
