= Ruth Tringham =

British archaeologist

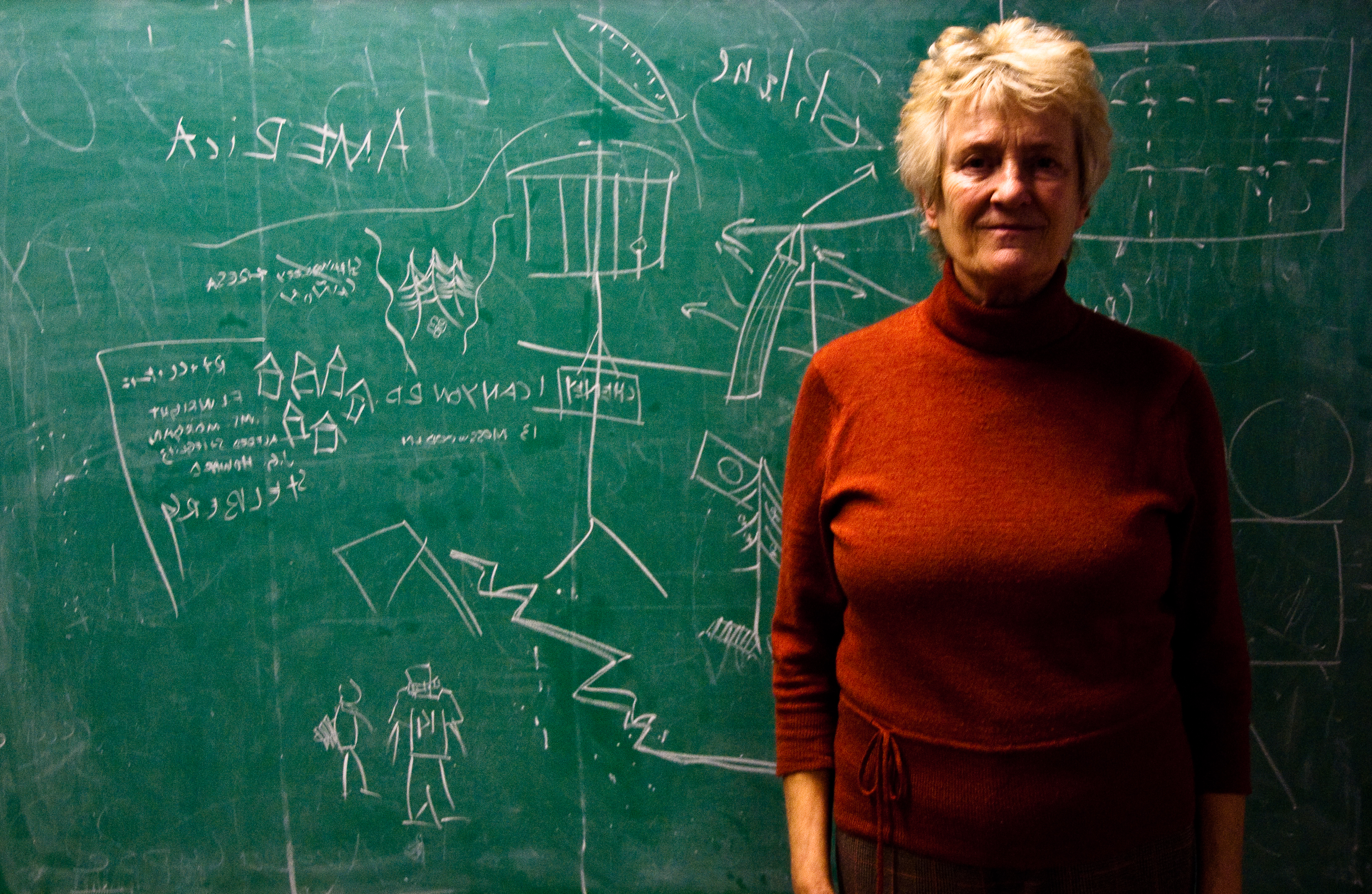
- Tringham in 2010
- Born: 14 October 1940 (age 86); Aspley Guise, Bedfordshire

Academic background
- Education: Girls' Day School Trust
- Alma mater: University of Edinburgh

Academic work
- Discipline: Anthropology
- Institutions: University of California, Berkeley
- Doctoral students: Sonya Atalay

Ruth Tringham (born 14 October 1940) is an anthropologist, focusing on the archaeology of Neolithic Europe and southwest Asia. She is a Professor of the Graduate School (Anthropology) at the University of California, Berkeley and Creative Director and President of the Center for Digital Archaeology (CoDA), a recently established non-profit organization. Before going to Berkeley, she taught at Harvard University and University College London. Tringham is probably best known for her work at Selevac (1976–1979) and Opovo (1983–1989), Serbia, at the Eneolithic tell settlement of Podgoritsa, Bulgaria (1995), and at the well-known site of Çatalhöyük (1997-), Turkey.

== Early life and hobbies ==
Tringham was born on 14 October 1940 in the village of Aspley Guise in Bedfordshire, England. She was the middle sibling with two older brothers and a younger brother and sister. When she was five years old, her family moved to London where she attended primary school until she was eleven. After she won a scholarship to an all-girls high school, part of the Girls Public Day School Trust in north London, her family moved to Hampstead. During high school she learned Latin and Greek and was active in children's clubs at the Natural History Museum in London, where she was introduced to proper research methods. As she was growing up, her mother encouraged her to question authority and realize the contexts in which these authorities are based. This early advice would lead to some of her innovative ideas and methods.

She started playing violin at age nine and kept playing until around the age of eighteen. Throughout her college career she played the guitar and sang folk songs that she had collected from the various countries she visited. Later on in life she began choral singing in Boston and then sang in the California Bach Society. After a few years she joined the San Francisco Symphony Chorus in 1984 where she has helped record several CDs and a Grammy Award-winning song of Carl Orff's Carmina Burana. Other hobbies growing up included fencing, volleyball, racquetball, skiing, hiking, and oil painting. She was a member of Great Britain's 1972 women's Olympic volleyball team.

== Education ==
Having first excavated in the Natural History Club at age thirteen, she knew she wanted to be an archaeologist by the time she was sixteen. She received both her undergraduate and graduate degrees at the University of Edinburgh in the Department of Archaeology. She chose Edinburgh for its pan-European perspective. In her first year the head of the department, Stuart Piggott, encouraged Tringham to write to the head of the National Museum of Denmark to ask if there were any field projects she could assist in excavating. She was subsequently invited to assist at Mogens Orsnes' excavation of an Iron Age bog site in Ejsbøl, Denmark.

Following the Ejsbøl excavation she surveyed along the Pasvik River in Norway, near the border with the USSR. She was on her way to becoming specialized in Scandinavian archaeology. However, there was a major changing point in her career during her junior year as a result of a trip to do fieldwork in Czechoslovakia. While here, she excavated the Neolithic site of Bylany with Bohumil Soudsky. It was here where she became fascinated with the archaeology of Eastern Europe and her research interests, although altered to a certain extent, still remain in that region. She wrote both her senior B.A. thesis and Ph.D. dissertation on Eastern Europe. The former was on Neolithic clay figurines of Eastern Europe, while the latter was called The Earlier Neolithic in Central Europe: A Study of the Linear Pottery Culture and their Relationships with the Contemporary Cultures of South-East Europe. She received her Ph.D. from the University of Edinburgh in 1966. Five years later she dedicated her first book, Hunters, Fishers, and Farmers: 6,000-3,000 B.C, to V. Gordon Childe, Stuart Piggott, Bohumil Soudsky, and Peter Ucko.

== Professional career ==
=== Research and theoretical interests ===
Throughout her career, Tringham has brought many innovative ideas to archaeology and challenged its traditional perspectives. She attempts to influence the methods used by archaeologists, thus giving more identity to the past. Some of her specific interests include prehistoric archaeology, European prehistory, archaeology and popular culture, and architecture and gender aspects in prehistory. Lately, her research has been on the life history of buildings and the construction of built space.

In her first book Hunters, Fishers, and Farmers: 6,000-3,000 B.C. she asserted that archaeologists should stick to the more scientific analyses of artifacts. She argues one should stay away from formulating speculative social interpretations from the artifacts. However, she now feels that this strict scientific approach is a weakness and argues that one should utilize social theory to try and construct a prehistory.

Tringham uses a feminist archaeological perspective when it comes to discussing her interests in gender relations and households. In her own words, "How to express the complexities of a feminist practice of archaeology-multiple interpretations of archaeological data at multiple scales, allowing multiple voices from past and present to be heard." To her, the masculine standpoint in archaeology overlooks the microscale (domestic) aspect, therefore devaluing the role of women in ancient societies. Earlier in her career she avoided defining gender relations, but now she states that studying the household in archaeology is crucial to not only gender relations, but also archaeology as a whole. Although she has feminist views on certain things, such as emphasizing the importance of microscale aspects in prehistory, this does not mean that she loses her objectivity to other ideas. Margaret Conkey and Ruth Tringham have collaborated on a public multimedia device that challenges the Goddess movement, which tries to portray the past matricentrically. To them, the movement is based primarily on a feminist agenda.

=== Notable excavations ===
==== Çatalhöyük, Turkey ====
Çatalhöyük is a tell of an extremely well preserved Neolithic and Chalcolithic site located in the Konya-Karaman Plain in modern day Turkey. Çatalhöyük is one of the oldest cities on record archaeologists, and it was inhabited from around 7100 BCE to 5600 BCE. Tringham is the Director of the Berkeley Archaeologists of Catalhoyuk (BACH), which is under the overall director of operations, Ian Hodder. To Tringham, Çatalhöyük is important not only because it encourages a team of archaeologists to think and record the basis and implications of their actions, but also because it can make the practice of feminist archaeology a reality.

==== Selevac, present day Serbia ====
The book, Selevac: A Neolithic Village in Yugoslavia, is based on excavations that she did at the Selevac site in former Yugoslavia. It was a cooperative project under Harvard, Berkeley, and the National Museum of Belgrade between 1976 and 1978. As a site report on Vinča cultures that occupied it between 5,000 and 4,400 BCE, this book illustrates the project's four main objectives. The first was to study the chronology and cultural evolution of the Neolithic cultures. Next, the project was investigating the socioeconomic transformation processes of early agricultural societies. Third, the book tries to study the settlement pattern variation between the unenclosed settlements and the deeply stratified settlements of the Vinča culture. The last aim was to examine the regional settlement pattern. She tries to trace the evolution of the village once food technology is introduced and making it a permanent, sedentary village.

==== Opovo-Ugar Bajbuk, Serbia ====
Located at Vojvodina in the lower valley of the Timis River, north of the Danube, Opovo-Ugar, which was occupied between 4700 and 4500 BCE, belongs to the Vinča-Pločnik culture and is another site that provides information on the socioeconomic developments during the Neolithic. The importance of this site, which was excavated in the 1980s, was the method of excavation and the analysis of architecture technology. In other words, the project wanted to investigate the degree of settlement permanence by looking at the occupation duration of the houses. Furthermore, she wanted to investigate the emergence of the household as a primary social unit and how it changes throughout history. This ties in with her future interests that deal with gender relations and microscale aspects in archaeology. However, at this time she said she was a ‘remedial’ feminist archaeologist because she believed that it was not credible to give "faces" to people of prehistory in order to "recreate" life as it actually was.

=== Pedagogical methods ===
Tringham has an interest in using digital media, specifically multimedia, to record and teach archaeology. This interest led to her and Margaret Conkey founding of the Multimedia Authoring Center for the Teaching of Anthropology (MACTiA) at Berkeley. For this innovation in digital education, Ruth Tringham, along with her colleagues Margaret Conkey and Rosemary Joyce, was awarded Berkeley's Educational Initiatives Award in 2001.

She was awarded the Presidential Chair in Undergraduate Teaching in 1998 for her approach to incorporating multimedia techniques in teaching archaeology.

Tringham is one of the founders of the Center for Digital Archaeology (CoDA), a non-profit company founded in April 2011. CoDA was created to help archaeologists and cultural resource and heritage managers "capture, preserve, and share digital content."

== Selected publications ==
- 1966 The Earlier Neolithic in Central Europe: A Study of the Linear Pottery Culture and their Relationships with the Contemporary Cultures of South-East Europe. Ph.D. dissertation, University of Edinburgh. Archaeology
- 1971 Hunters, Fishers and Farmers of Eastern Europe 6,000-3,000 B.C. Hutchinson: London.
- 1972 Man, Settlement, and Urbanism (with Peter Ucko). Schenkman Pub. Co.: Cambridge.
- 1973 Territoriality and Proxemics: Archaeological and Ethnographic Evidence for the Use and Organization of Space. (Ed.) Warner Modular Publications: Andover.
- 1973 Urban Settlements: the Process of Urbanization in Archaeological Settlements. (Ed.) Warner Modular Publications: Andover.
- 1973 Ecology and Agricultural Settlements: An Ethnographic and Archaeological Perspective. (Ed.) Warner Modular Publications: Andover.
- 1974 "South Russia, the Caucasus, and the Near East: an Alternative Model for Cultural Change" in American Journal of Archaeology 78, No. 4 (October): pp. 348–349
- 1985 "The Opovo Project: A Study of Socioeconomic Change in the Balkan Neolithic" (with B. Brukner and B. Voytek) in Journal of Field Archaeology 12, No. 4 (Winter): pp. 425–444.
- 1990 Selevac: A Neolithic Village in Yugoslavia. (with Dusan Krstic). University of California, Los Angeles: Los Angeles.
- 1991 "Households with Faces: The Challenge of Gender in Prehistoric Architectural Remains" in Engendering Archaeology: Women in Prehistory by Gero, J. and Conkey, M. Blackwell Publishers: Oxford. pp. 93–131.
- 1993 Nationalism and Internationalism in Writing the Prehistory of the New East Europe. University of California, Berkeley
- 1995 Conkey, Margaret and Tringham, R. "Archaeology and the Goddess: Exploring the Contours of Feminist Archaeology" in Feminisms in the Academy: Rethinking the Disciplines. University of Michigan Press: Ann Arbor.

== Awards ==
- 1998: Presidential Chair in Undergraduate Teaching
- 1998: Chancellor's Cybersemester Award
- 2001: Educational Initiatives Award
