= Joan Gero =

American archaeologist

Joan Margaret Gero
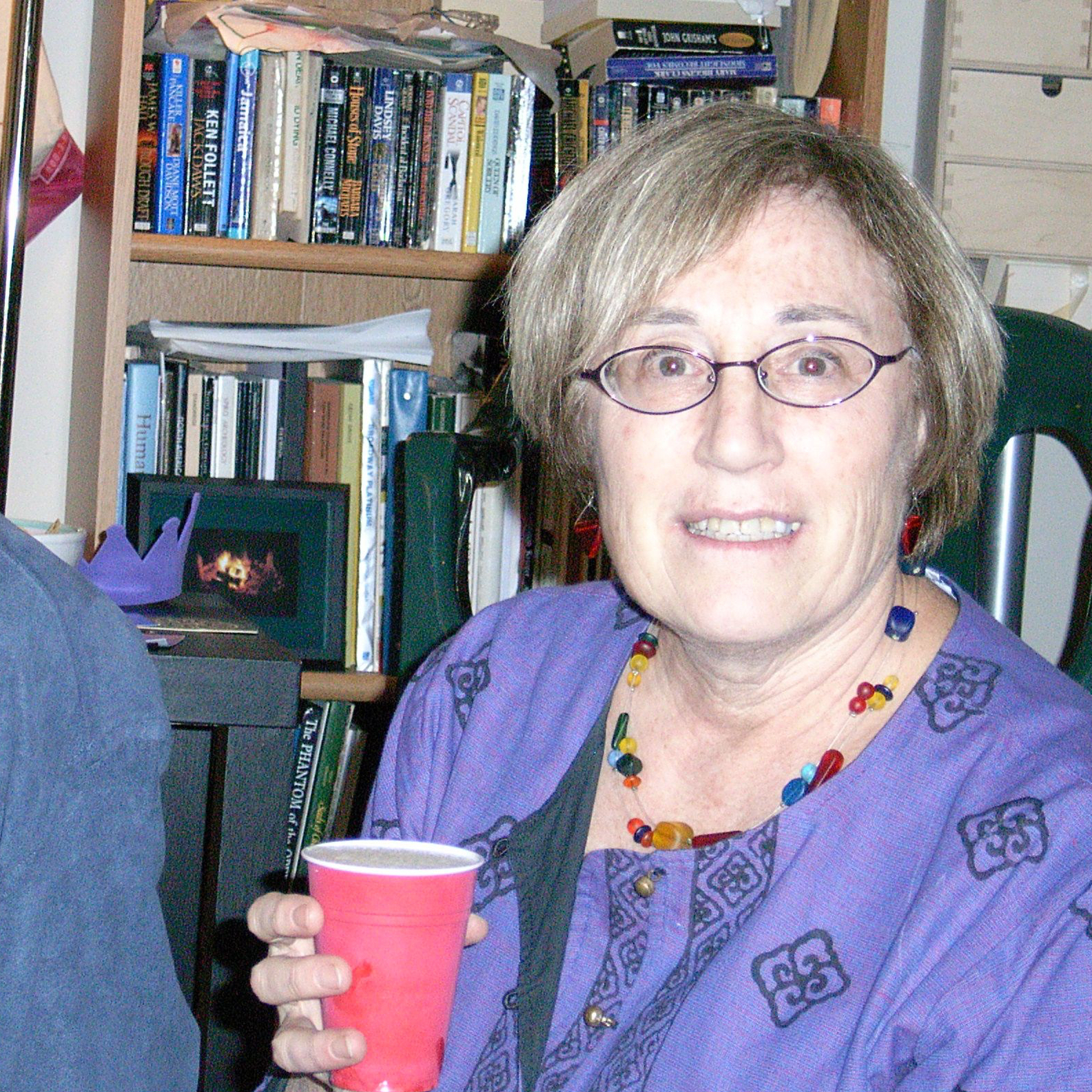
- Joan Gero in 2005
- Born: May 26, 1944; New York City, New York
- Died: July 14, 2016 (aged 72)
- Occupation: Archaeologist
- Organization: World Archaeological Congress
- Known for: Feminist Archaeology
- Notable work: "Engendering Archaeology: Women and Prehistory" 1991 with Margaret Conkey

Joan Margaret Gero (26 May 1944 – 14 July 2016) was an American archaeologist and pioneer of feminist archaeology. Her research focused on gender and power issues in prehistory, particularly in the Andean regions of Argentina and Peru.

== Biography ==
Gero was born in New York City on 26 May 1944. She graduated from the University of Pennsylvania with a BA in English Literature in 1968, before receiving an M.Ed from Boston College in 1970. The next two years were spent teaching socioeconomically disadvantaged groups with the Teacher Corps. In 1972 Gero studied archaeology during a summer course in Oxford, excavating at an Iron Age site in Wiltshire.

In 1974 Gero began graduate studies at the University of Massachusetts Amherst, with Martin Wobst, gaining a Phd in Anthropology in 1983. Gero taught at the University of South Carolina from 1983 to 1997.

With Margaret Conkey she co-edited the groundbreaking 1991 volume Engendering Archaeology: Women and Prehistory, reprinted six times, which stemmed from a 1988 conference “Women and Production in Prehistory".

Gero has held visiting professorships at Cambridge University, the Universidad Nacional de Catamarca, the University of Umeå, University of Uppsala, and the Universidad Nacional del Centro de Buenos Aires, Olavarría, Argentina. In 1998 Gero was appointed Assistant Professor at American University in Washington, D.C., where she taught courses in archaeology, anthropology and women's studies. Gero was also a research associate at the Department of Anthropology at the Smithsonian Institution. At the time of her death she was a professor emerita.

Gero received funding from Fulbright, the National Science Foundation, the Wenner-Gren Foundation, the Heintz foundation, and the National Endowment for the Humanities.

Throughout her career Gero was heavily involved in the World Archaeological Congress (WAC), serving as the senior North American representative from 1999–2008, organising WAC-5 in 2003, acting as Head Series Editor for the One World Book Series 2003-2008, and serving on the Standing Committee for Ethics from 2007. Gero was a Lifetime Fellow of Clare Hall, University of Cambridge.

== Personal life ==
Gero died on July 14, 2016. Gero's husband was archaeologist Stephen Loring.

== Awards and recognition ==
Gero was awarded the Squeaky Wheel by the American Anthropological Association’s Committee on the Status of Women in Anthropology in 2007. In 2016 at WAC-8, WAC created the Joan Gero Book Award in her honour.

== Selected publications ==
- Gero, J. 2015. Yutopian: Archaeology, Ambiguity and the Production of Knowledge in Northwest Argentina. Austin: University of Texas Press.
- Gero, J. 2012. Femidoxy: a private challenge to orthodox field methodology. Labrys. Études feministes https://www.labrys.net.br/labrys22/archeo/gero.htm#uma
- Loring S. & J. Gero. 2012. The evolution of happiness. Archaeologies 8(3): 376-402. doi:10.1007/s11759-012-9208-x
- Gero, J. 2007. Honoring Ambiguity/Problematizing Certitude. Journal of Archaeological Method and Theory 14: 311–327.
- Gero, J. M. & M. C. Scattolin. 2002. Beyond complementarity and hierarchy: new definitions for archaeological gender relations, in S. Nelson & M. Rosen-Ayalon (ed.) In pursuit of gender: worldwide archaeological perspectives: 155-71. Walnut Creek (CA): Altamira Press.
- Gero, J.M. 1996. Archaeological practice and gendered encounters with field data, in R. Wright (ed.) Gender and archaeology: 251-80. Philadelphia: University of Pennsylvania Press.
- Gero, J.M. 1994. Excavation Bias and the Woman-at-Home Ideology. In Equity Issues for Women in Archaeology, edited by M. Nelson, S. Nelson and A. Wylie. American Anthropological Asso. Archaeological Papers No. 5., 1994
- Gero, J. M. 1983. Gender bias in archaeology: a cross-cultural perspective, in J. M. Gero, D. M. Lacy & M. L. Blakey (ed.) The socio-politics of archaeology: 51-57. Amherst: Department of Anthropology, University of Massachusetts.
