= Darwin and women =

Social views of Charles Darwin

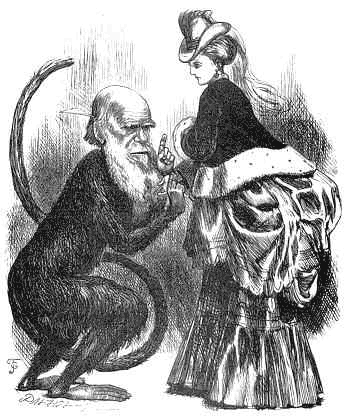
A caricature of Charles Darwin contemplating a Victorian-era bustle as a curiosity of natural history, from Fun, 16th Nov, 1872

Charles Darwin's views on women were based on his view of natural selection. Darwin believed that the difference between males and females were partly due to "sexual selection". Darwin's theory of sexual selection, which can be found in his book The Descent of Man and Selection in Relation to Sex, states that women, and some men, will choose to mate with someone that is most suitable to culture. This proposition of sexual selection readily tied into his theory of natural selection in the way that evolution will have different outcomes depending on the traits of the male that females chooses to reproduce with. This also supports his principle of "survival of the fittest" in the human species.

Darwin concludes in his book, The Descent of Man, saying that men attain "a higher eminence, in whatever he takes up, than can women—whether requiring deep thought, reason, or imagination, or merely the use of the senses and hands." More research has been centered around letters that Darwin wrote and exchanged with about 150 women in his lifetime which includes both women close to him and women from other places in the world. The letters show private thoughts and actions which are different to the gender ideology held by common middle-class Victorians. The letters show that in private Darwin relied on various women for some of his work including his daughter Henrietta who helped in editing The Descent of Man. Darwin also helped many of these women progress their scientific careers. He wrote to Eleanor Mary Dicey in 1877 about his concern that some women might not want to study psychology only because they are women. There is also evidence of Darwin's correspondence with women of that time who challenged the gender ideology such as Florence Dixie, a traveler, writer and hunter who endorsed equality in marriage and Caroline Kennard, an American writer and feminist. Dixie also wrote a book which created the fantasy of a world where men and women were equals.

== See also ==
- Women in prehistory
- Darwin and religion
