= Queer archaeology =

Approach using queer theory

Queer archaeology is an approach to archaeology that uses queer theory to challenge normative, and especially heteronormative, views of the past.

Queer archaeology does not attempt to look for past examples of homosexual people, of other sexual orientations or alternative gender identities in history, or to explain the origin of these concepts. What it does intend is to favor a critical point of view and escape from the normative and binary assumptions of the predominant archaeological discourse. In this last point, queer archaeology coincides with feminist archaeology. This does not only represent a look at women from the past or an introduction of this gender in the interpretations of the past, but also and above all to challenge the sexist values of archaeological interpretations.

== Difference between feminist, gender, transgender and queer archaeology ==
Feminist, gender and queer archaeology were appearing as an evolution of one another, and were influenced by different social movements such as the feminist movement or the queer movement.

=== Feminist archaeology ===
The first of the three that appeared was feminist archaeology, because of the symbiosis with all the feminist movements that emerged during the 20th century throughout Europe and the United States. This had the merit, for the first time, to criticize and question the practice of bringing current values (regarding gender roles) to the past, both consciously and unconsciously, in archaeological researches. Furthermore, feminist archaeologies tend to try to answer questions such as: has gender inequality always existed or is it a historical product? Or, more broadly, are social inequality and exploitation inherent to humanity or are they the result of historical transformations?

=== Gender archaeology ===
Gender archaeology appears as a reaction to the previous approach and focuses on offering information on gender, without other political connotations. Also, sometimes, this is disconnected from the initial feminist approach, offering more freedom when making interpretations. Gender and feminist archaeology are sometimes used synonymously, reversed in their meanings, or studied together. This means that the difference between the two is, many times, not defined and conditioned by the opinion of each archaeologist.

=== Transgender archaeology ===
Transgender archaeology falls in the Queer Archaeology umbrella but largely focuses on challenging dominate views of binary sex, gender, and expression in the past. It highlights intersectionality rather than gender and sex binaries. Intersectionality is a concept that releases the hold that gender, race, and class hold over individuals and groups. The idea is to be able to live a life where one doesnt need to worry about their race, gender, or class especially in circumstances that would typically have links to oppression or privilege.

Transgender Priestesses can be conclusively traced back to the late Paleolithic Era in not earlier. This shows that transgender priestesses were not simply a reaction to feminine leadership and admiration but a choice made to be true to ones self. Not only was being transgender one of the oldest European customs but it even appears to be seen as ones religious duty to have some form of gender transgression in some regions of ancient Europe confirming that not only do transgender people exist but they have existed as long as the first stone tools (2.5 - 3.3 million years ago).

Around 1473 BCE in ancient Egypt, Hatshepsut adopted both male and female honorific titles while also combining male titles with feminine grammar. They had also had I’mages commissioned of themself in which they combined both genders. Hatshepsut claimed themself the son of the highest god in order to be able to crown themself pharaoh though having been the queen regent for many years.

=== Queer archaeology ===
Queer archaeology arose thanks to the appearance of queer theories and as a criticism of the two previous ones, in their use of gender / sex equality, the non-contemplation of different cultures, ethnicities and social classes, and their Eurocentric vision. It critiques original anthropological approaches to sex and gender identity and allows interdisciplinary approaches to history and archaeology, which grows a more diverse and accurate understanding of the past. It also defends that the great variety of social identities and the questioning of concepts such as family or family unit must be considered. One example of this lens in practice is the former site of Green Gate at Greenham Common Women's Peace Camp. The 19 year-long protest dedicated to the removal of American cruise missiles stored on UK soil illustrates the struggle of grassroots activism, with the site standing as a symbol of resistance.

== See also ==
- Queer studies
- Queer theology
