= Sonya Atalay =

Archaeologist

- Born: Sonya Lynn Atalay
- Occupation: Public anthropological archaeologist
- Title: Professor

Academic background
- Education: University of Michigan (BA); University of California Berkeley (MA, PhD)
- Thesis: Domesticating clay: Engaging with 'they'. The social life of clay balls from Çatalhöyük, Turkey and public archaeology for indigenous communities (2003)
- Doctoral advisor: Ruth Tringham

Academic work
- Discipline: Archaeology
- Institutions: Massachusetts Institute of Technology
- Website: anthropology.mit.edu/people/faculty/sonya-atalay

Sonya Lynn Atalay (Anishinaabe-Ojibwe) is an anthropological archaeologist noted for her research into Native American and Indigenous Studies (NAIS); applying community-based research, working with Indigenous Peoples in order to develop a deeper understanding into community-based protection and management of cultural sites. Atalay has contributed to her field through numerous publications and research projects and through her role as a public figure and professor of anthropology at the Massachusetts Institute of Technology.

== Education ==
Sonya Atalay studied a B.A. in Anthropology and Classical Archaeology at the University of Michigan at Ann Arbor in 1991, followed by an M.A. in Anthropology at the University of California Berkeley in 1998. In 2003, Atalay went on to complete her PhD in Anthropology at the same institution for work on Çatalhöyük supervised by Ruth Tringham. Atalay continued on as a Postdoctoral Fellow at University of California, Berkeley from 2003 to 2005. She accepted a position as a National Science Foundation Postdoctoral Fellow at Stanford University from 2005 to 2007, focused on developing Community-Based Participatory Research.

== Career ==
From 2007 to 2012 Sonya Atalay served as an Assistant Professor of Anthropology and Adjunct Assistant Professor in the Department of American Studies at Indiana University. In 2012, Atalay was hired as an Assistant Professor of Anthropology at University of Massachusetts Amherst, later promoted to Associate Professor in 2014. As of 2025, she is a provost professor at UMass Amherst and a Professor of Anthropology at MIT. She is also the Director and Co-Primary Investigator at the Center for Braiding Indigenous Knowledges and Science (CBIKS) on the MIT campus.

=== Indigenous Archaeology ===
Following her PhD, Atalay began shifting her focus from Classical archaeology abroad to public archaeology in the United States. From 2008-2016, while serving in the IP and Research Ethics Work Group of the Intellectual Property in Cultural Heritage (IPinCH), Atalay began drawing on Anishinaabe knowledge systems to develop collaborative community-based program of research with Anishinaabek communities in the Great Lakes region. Atalay collaborated with the Saginaw Chippewa Indian Tribe of Michigan to create a plan to protect and control the use of ezhibiigaadek asin. Included in this plan were initiatives to curtail inappropriate uses of the tribe's Indigenous Intellectual Property, particularly in relation to commercialization of the over 100 petroglyphs at the site.

Atalay served two terms (2009 – 2013; 2013 – 2015) on the National NAGPRA Review Committee which further guided her research interests in the rematriation and mobilization of Indigenous Knowledges. Atalay, along with Jen Shannon and John Swogger produced a series of comics in partnership with Native nations to educate the public about the repatriation of Native American ancestral remains, return of sacred objects and objects of cultural patrimony under NAGPRA law.

Since 2019, Atalay has been a major figure in the advancement of Indigenous Knowledge alongside and equal to Western Science, a concept now termed Braiding Knowledge. With funding by the National Science Foundation's Science and Technology Centers: Integrative Partnerships program, Atalay alongside co-principal investigators; Ora Marek-Martinez, Bonnie Newsom, and Jon Woodruff, established the Center for Braiding Indigenous Knowledges and Science (CBIKS) on the MIT campus.

== Works ==
=== Books ===
- Community-Based Archaeology: Research with, by, and for Indigenous and Local Communities. Berkeley, CA: University of California Press, 2012.

=== Chapters ===
- "An Archaeology Led by Strawberries." In Archaeologies of the Heart, edited by Kisha Supernant, Jane Eva Baxter, Natasha Lyons, and Sonya Atalay, 253–69. Cham, Switzerland: Springer International Publishing, 2020.

=== Edited volumes ===
- Atalay, Sonya, ed. Transforming Archaeology: Activist Practices and Prospects. London, UK: Routledge, 2016.
- Atalay, Sonya, and Alexandra McCleary, eds. The Community-Based PhD: Complexities and Triumphs of Conducting CBPR. Tucson, AZ: University of Arizona Press, 2022.
- Supernant, Kisha, Jane Eva Baxter, Natasha Lyons, and Sonya Atalay, eds. Archaeologies of the Heart. Cham, Switzerland: Springer International Publishing, 2020.

=== Articles ===
- "Braiding Strands of Wellness." The Public Historian 41, no. 1 (February 1, 2019): 78–89.
- "Can Archaeology Help Decolonize the Way Institutions Think? How Community-Based Research Is Transforming the Archaeology Training Toolbox and Helping to Transform Institutions." Archaeologies 15, no. 3 (December 2019): 514–35.
- "Exploring Interpretive Trails." Journal of Community Archaeology & Heritage 2, no. 2 (2015): 85–88.
- "Indigenous Archaeology as Decolonizing Practice." American Indian Quarterly 30, no. 3/4 (2006): 280–310.
- "Indigenous Science for a World in Crisis." Public Archaeology 19, no. 1–4 (October 1, 2020): 37–52.
- "Repatriation and Bearing Witness." American Anthropologist 120, no. 3 (September 2018): 544–45.

=== Co-Authored Works ===
- Anderson, Jane, and Sonya Atalay. "Repatriation as Pedagogy." Current Anthropology 64, no. 6 (2023): 670–91.
- Atalay, Sonya, Letizia Bonanno, Sally Campbell Galman, Sarah Jacqz, Ryan Rybka, Jen Shannon, Cary Speck, John Swogger, and Erica Wolencheck. "Ethno/Graphic Storytelling: Communicating Research and Exploring Pedagogical Approaches through Graphic Narratives, Drawings, and Zines." American Anthropologist 121, no. 3 (September 2019): 769–72.
- Atalay, Sonya, Nika Collison Jisgang, Te Herekiekie Herewini, Eric Hollinger, Michelle Horwood, Robert W Preucel, Anthony Shelton, and Paul Tapsell. "Ritual Processes of Repatriation: A Discussion." Museum Worlds 5, no. 1 (2017): 88–94.
- Atalay, Sonya, and Jen Shannon. "Completing the Journey: A Graphic Narrative about NAGPRA and Repatriation." American Anthropologist 121, no. 3 (2019): 769–72.
- Hauser, Mark W., Whitney Battle‐Baptiste, Koji Lau‐Ozawa, Barbara L. Voss, Reinhard Bernbeck, Susan Pollock, Randall H. McGuire, Uzma Z. Rizvi, Christopher Hernandez, and Sonya Atalay. "Archaeology as Bearing Witness." American Anthropologist 120, no. 3 (September 2018): 535–36.

== Awards and honours ==
- 2010 Indiana University Trustees Teaching Award
- 2011 Indiana State Senate Commendation acknowledging community-based research with Sullivan County American Indian Council to develop Interpretive Heritage Trail
- 2020 Chancellor's Leadership Fellowship (partnered with Deputy Chancellor to develop UMass Office of Community-Based Research
- 2021 Distinguished Graduate Mentor Award, UMass Amherst Graduate School
- 2021 Named first UMass Amherst 'Provost Professor'
- 2022 American Anthropological Association, Patty Jo Watson Distinguished Lecture Award
- 2023 Chancellor's Medal Recipient, University of Massachusetts Amherst
