= Ora Marek-Martinez =

American archaeologist

- Occupation: Indigenous Archaeologist
- Title: Assistant Professor

Academic background
- Education: Northern Arizona University (BA, MA), University of California Berkeley (PhD)
- Thesis: Archaeology For, By, and With the Navajo People- the Nihook'aa Dine'e' Bila' Ashdlaa'ii Way (2016)
- Doctoral advisor: Margaret W. Conkey

Academic work
- Discipline: Archaeology
- Sub-discipline: Southwest
- Institutions: Office of Native American Initiatives, NAU
- Website: https://directory.nau.edu/person/ovm

Ora Marek-Martinez (Diné/Nez Perce/Hopi) is an American archaeologist noted for her leadership in Tribal Historic Preservation and advocating for Indigenous research methods in the U.S. Southwest.

== Education ==
Ora Marek-Martinez began a bachelor's degree in Mechanical Engineering at Northern Arizona University in 1996, before switching to Anthropology and History. She graduated in 2001 and then earned a master's in Applied Cultural Anthropology in 2003, also from Northern Arizona University. During her M.A. program she also participated in the Navajo Nation Archaeology Department (NNAD) Student Training Program which was run in cooperation with NAU. She received her doctorate in Anthropology-Archaeology in 2016 from the University of California Berkeley. Her doctoral dissertation serves as the foundation for her community-based archaeological practice for, by, and with the Navajo people.

== Career ==
Marek-Martinez served in multiple positions in the Navajo Nation Archaeology Department from 2001 to 2015, mainly as an archaeologist and programs manager. Between 2014 and 2016, she was the Navajo Nation Representative for the Glen Canyon Adaptive Management Program Technical Working Group, where she advocated for ethical and collaborative resource management in the Glen Canyon Dam area. During this time Marek-Martinez was also serving as the Department Manager for the Navajo Nation Heritage and Historic Preservation Department. In 2016 she was hired as the director of the Native American Cultural Center at her alma mater, Northern Arizona University. She held the post until 2022, when she was appointed Associate Vice President of the Office of Native American Initiatives at NAU. Marek-Martinez is currently the Director of the Seven Generations Indigenous Knowledge Center (7Gen Center) and Faculty Co-Chair of the Commission for Indigenous Peoples.

Since 2019, Marek-Martinez has been a major figure in the advancement of Indigenous Knowledge alongside and equal to Western Science, a concept now termed Braiding Knowledge. With funding by the National Science Foundation's Science and Technology Centers: Integrative Partnerships program, Ora Marek-Martinez alongside co-principal investigators; Sonya Atalay, Bonnie Newsom, and Jon Woodruff, established the Center for Braiding Indigenous Knowledges and Science (CBIKS) on the MIT campus. In her role, Marek-Martinez and NAU serve as the Southwest Hub researching climate change, heritage protection, food sovereignty, and decolonizing/indigenizing archaeology.

== Selected Bibliography ==
=== Books ===
- "Archaeology for, by, and with the Navajo People-The Nihookáá Dine'é'Bila'Ashdla'ii Way." PhD dissertation, University of California, Berkeley, 2016.

=== Chapters ===
- "Archaeology the Tribal Way: Reestablishing the Boundaries of Culture." In Kennewick Man: Perspectives from the Ancient One, 217–22. Walnut Creek, CA: Left Coast Press, 2008.
- "Indigenous Archaeological Approaches and the Refusal of Colonialism in Archaeology." In Routledge Handbook of the Archaeology of Indigenous-Colonial Interaction in the Americas, 503–15. London, UK: Routledge, 2021.
- "Learning and Teaching with Love: An Indigenous Auntie's Journey in Archaeology." In Working as Indigenous Archaeologists: Reckoning New Paths Between Past and Present Lives, edited by George P. Nicholas and Joe Watkins, 269–79. Archaeology and Indigenous Peoples. New York, NY: Taylor & Francis, 2024.

=== Articles ===
- "A Look at Past Scholarship Recipients and the Native American Scholarships Committee." The SAA Archaeological Record 4 (2016): 8–9.
- "Crime and Social Justice in Indian Country." Kiva 84, no. 4 (2018): 501–3.
- "NAGPRA's Achilles Heel: The Disposition of Culturally Unidentifiable Human Remains." Heritage Management 1, no. 2 (2008): 243–59.

=== Co-Authored Texts ===
- Gonzalez, Sara L., and Ora V. Marek-Martinez. "NAGPRA and the next Generation of Collaboration." SAA Archaeological Record 15, no. 1 (2015): 11–13.
- Hovermill, Jeffrey, Ora V. Marek-Martinez, and Cole Joslyn. "Honoring Culture Within STEM Education Partnerships." In Honoring Our Indigenous Languages and Cultures, edited by Jon Reyhner, Joseph Martin, and Louise Lockard, 97–103. Flagstaff, AZ: Northern Arizona University Press, 2024.
- Marek‐Martinez, Ora, and Sara L Gonzalez. "Good Medicine: Prescriptions for Indigenous Archaeological Practice." Edited by April M. Beisaw, David E. Witt, Katie Kirakosian, and Ryan J. Wheeler. Archeological Papers of the American Anthropological Association 34, no. 1: Sins of Our Ancestors (and of Ourselves): Confronting Archaeological Legacies (2023): 47–57.
- Marek-Martinez, Ora V., Gonzalez, Sara L., and P. Garcia-Plotkin. "NAGPRA and Archaeological Values: A Response to the SAA Repatriation Survey." The SAA Archaeological Record 4 (2016): 24–25.
- Thompson, Kerry F., and Ora V. Marek-Martinez. "Engaging Archaeology as Social Justice for Navajo Communities." In Trowels in the Trenches: Archaeology as Social Activism, edited by Christopher P. Barton, 211–22. Gainesville, FL: University Press of Florida, 2021.
- Thompson, Kerry F., and Ora V. Marek-Martinez. "Remaking Place: Diné Land, Health, and Wellness." In Indigenous Health and Justice, edited by Karen Jarratt-Snider and Marianne O. Nielsen, 193–204. Indigenous Justice. Tucson, AZ: University of Arizona Press, 2024.
