= Women in prehistory =

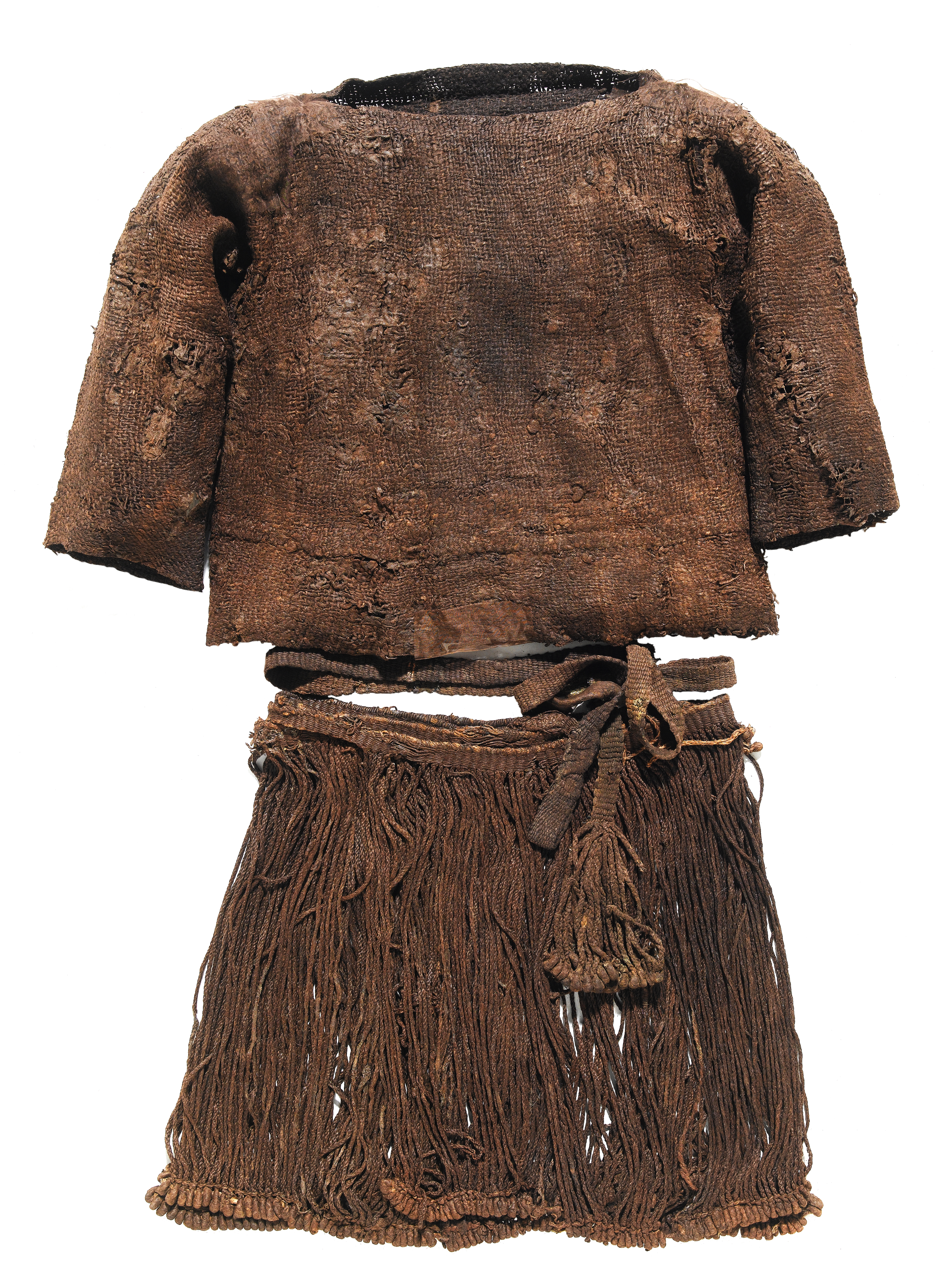
Burial clothing of the Egtved Girl, c. 1370 BC

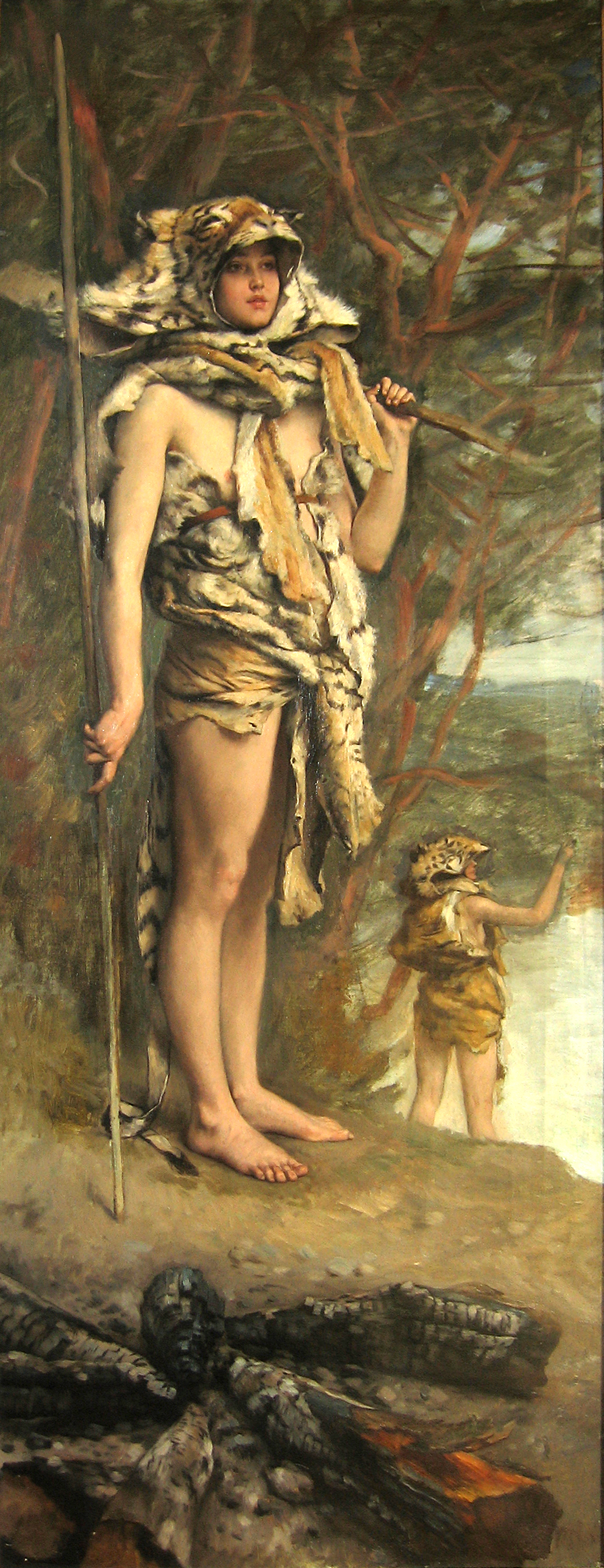
Prehistoric Woman by James Tissot (1895)

A large amount of research on prehistory has been dedicated to the role of women in prehistoric society. Tasks typically undertaken by women are thought to have formed a major sexual division of labor in relation to child-rearing, gathering, and other everyday occupations. More recent research has however suggested women also played an active role in hunting and other physical activities in place of the exclusively domestic roles traditionally occupied by women in literary civilizations.

The study of prehistoric women is of particular interest to feminist and gender archeology, which seek to challenge androcentric assumptions in conventional archeology.

== Anthropology ==
=== Matriarchy and matrilineality ===
A major point of contention throughout anthropology from as early as the 19th century was the difference, if any, in social status between prehistoric and contemporary women. Early socialistic thinkers such as Lewis H. Morgan, Friedrich Engels or August Bebel openly equated matrilineality with primitive communism and patrilineality with individualism, oppression, and private property. Such schools typically argued that due to the lack of a definitive line of paternal descent without socially enforced monandry, prehistoric societies instead practiced matrifocal, communal motherhood.

Similar ideas arose during the second wave of feminism with the increased study of matrilocality and matriarchal religion, such as Marija Gimbutas's theory of a matristic, egalitarian "Old Europe" later outcompeted and conquered by the patriarchal and expansionist Proto-Indo-Europeans. Such interpretations remain highly controversial due to perceptions of political bias or lack of material evidence, but have been defended by notable figures such as anthropologist Chris Knight, who instead criticized what he saw as ad-hoc functionalist attempts to downplay obvious matrilineal traditions in contemporary tribal societies.

=== Woman the Gatherer versus Woman the Hunter ===
From the 1970s onward, the dominant scientific perspective of gendered roles in hunter-gatherer societies was of a model termed "Man the Hunter, Woman the Gatherer". Coined by anthropologists Richard Borshay Lee and Irven DeVore in 1968, it argued that contemporary foragers displayed a clear division of labor between women and men. More recent evidence compiled by researchers such as Sarah Lacy and Cara Ocobock has found a lack of conclusive preferences for gendered roles among modern hunter-gatherer societies. Recent archeological research done by the anthropologist and archeologist Steven Kuhn suggests that the sexual division of labor did not exist prior to the Upper Paleolithic (50,000 and 10,000 years ago) and developed relatively recently in human history. Lacy and Ocobock in particular highlighted the role of estrogen in the potential contributions of women to everyday survival in prehistoric societies; contrary to popular belief, testosterone only significantly affects the development of type 2 muscle fibers when compared to estrogen, which instead primarily affects the development of type 1 fibers. Type 2 muscles perform better in short-term "power" activities, such as weight-lifting or spear-throwing, while type 1 muscles perform better in long-term, endurance-based "marathon" activities. Women's muscles are thus more energy-efficient, which implies that persistence hunting, a technique thought to have formed one of the main evolutionary advantages of hominids over their otherwise far more mobile prey, would have been easier for women to perform than men. A following study found "that multiple methodological failures all bias their results in the same direction...their analysis does not contradict the wide body of empirical evidence for gendered divisions of labor in foraging societies".

Notable hunter-gatherer groups in recent or contemporary eras known to lack a distinct sexual division of labor include the Ainu, Agta, and Ju/'hoansi, in addition to significant material evidence for female involvement in hunting among prehistoric cultures such as those in what is today Peru.

== Material culture ==
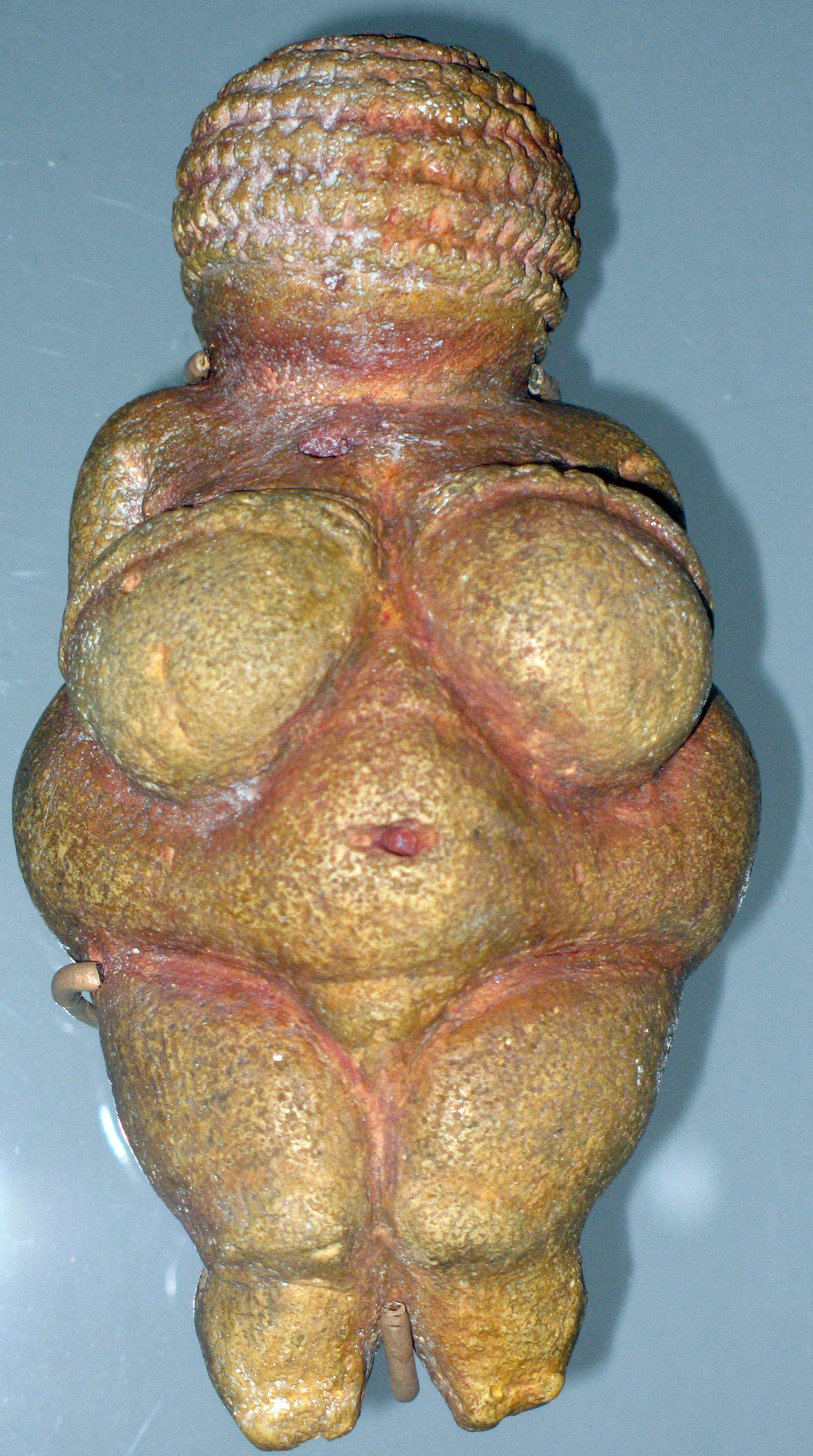
The Venus of Willendorf, c. 23,000 BC

=== Prehistoric art ===
The Upper Paleolithic era is known for displaying a wealth of artistic representations of women, which are generally grouped together under the term of Venus figurines as some of the first works of human culture in history. Venus figurines are noted for their exaggerated sexual characteristics, commonly taken as symbols of fertility and sexuality, and include the earliest known representation of a human being; Known as the Venus of Hohle Fels, it is described by anthropologist Nicholas Conard as "about sex, reproduction... [it is] an extremely powerful depiction of the essence of being female". Other notable figurines include the Willendorf, Dolní Věstonice, and Moravany Venuses, all of which are distinguished by a focus on the hips, breasts, and stomach. Examples are generally centered around Europe, inhabited at the time by relatively advanced Cro-Magnon cultures, though the term has been applied as far abroad as Siberia. Similar motifs from subsequent eras include the Potnia Theron, found in the ancient Mediterranean and Near East.

Some feminist scholars, such as Kaylea Vandewettering or Leroy McDermott, have criticized the male gaze involved in terming and categorizing the Venuses, the name of which originates from the first figurine to be recovered, the Vénus Impudique. Coined the "Immodest Venus" by its discoverer, it was named for both contemporary European views of sex and for a perceived association with the sexuality and fertility ascribed to the Roman Venus, despite the Paleolithic cultures responsible predating Greco-Roman religions by millennia and no materially substantiated consensus as to the figurines' significance ever being reached among researchers.

Catherine McCoid and McDermott suggested that because of the way these figures are depicted, such as the large breasts and lack of feet and faces, these statues were made by women looking at their own bodies. They state that women during the period would not have had access to mirrors to maintain accurate proportions or depict the faces or heads of the figurines. The theory remains difficult to prove or disprove, and Michael S. Bisson suggested that alternatives, such as puddles, could have been used as mirrors.

=== Burial practices ===
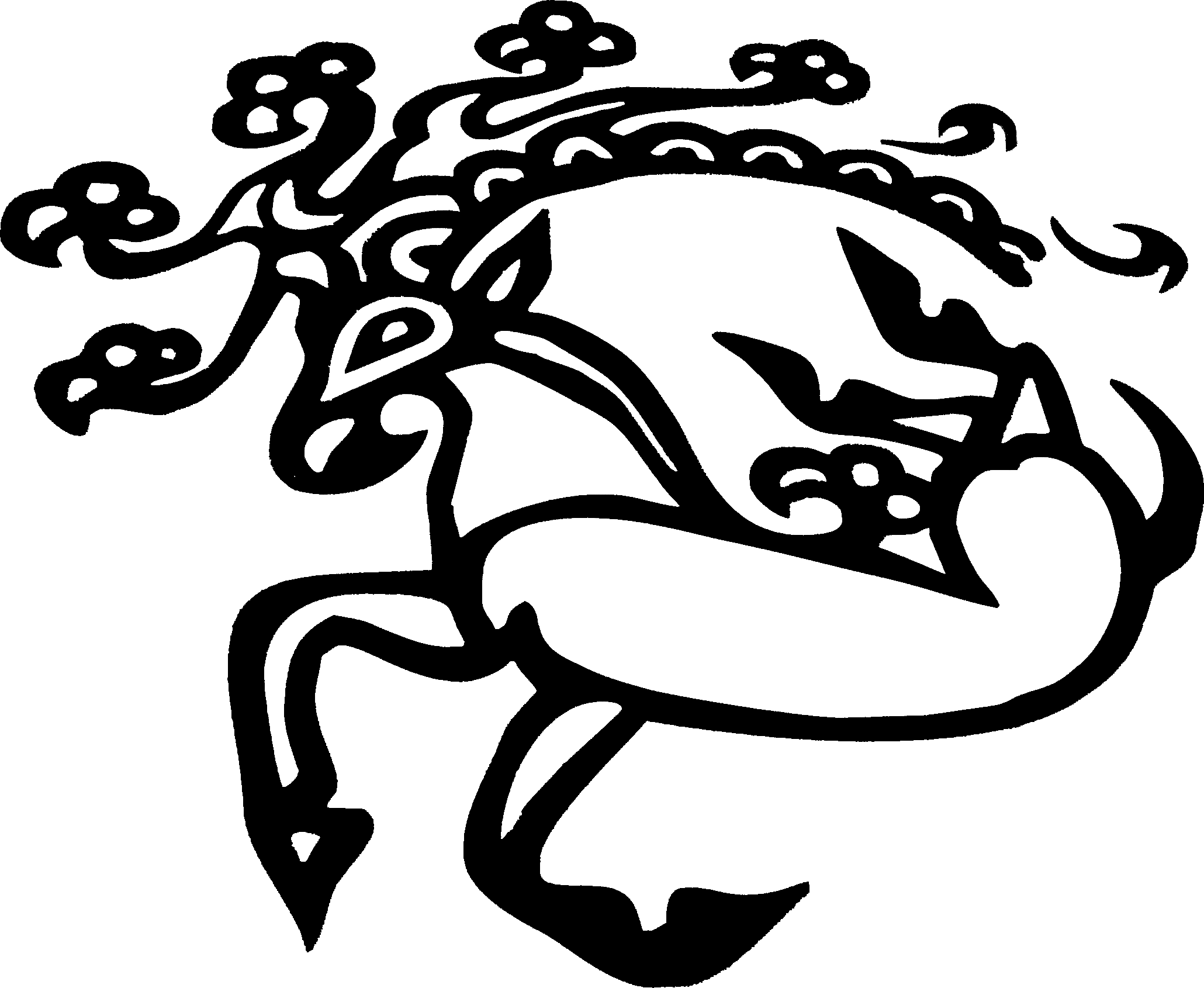
Tattoo design reconstructed from the arm of the Siberian Ice Maiden, c. 500-400 BC

Lacy and Ocobock stated that burial sites from the Upper Paleolithic did not demonstrate any difference between the grave goods or posthumous treatment afforded to men compared to women, further suggesting a lack of "social hierarchies based on sex".

The more general archeological record has found many notable examples of lavish tombs and burial practices for women, including famous cases such as the Egtved Girl and Princess of Ukok. Excavations have yielded a wealth of well-preserved grave goods including stitching awls, medicinal supplies, cosmetics, hairnets, and miscellaneous decorative items.

== Genetics ==
Study of the human mitochondria has allowed geneticists to begin pinpointing the matrilineal most recent common ancestor of all humanity, i.e. the last-living woman from which all modern humans are descended in an unbroken mother-to-daughter line, known as the Mitochondrial Eve in reference to the Genesis creation myth. As of 2015, estimates of the age of the Y-MRCA range around 200,000 to 300,000 years ago, roughly consistent with the emergence of anatomically modern humans.

Researchers also noted that the estrogen receptor seen in humans is anywhere from 1.2 billion to 600 million years older than the equivalent androgen receptor, indicating it likely had a major evolutionary role in the development of humanity's ancestors.

Genetic admixture between Neanderthals and anatomically modern humans has been found to display a clear difference between sexes, with the complete lack of mitochondrial Neanderthal DNA indicating that surviving hybrid lineages originated specifically from neanderthalensis male-sapiens sapiens female couplings.

== See also ==
- Great Goddess hypothesis
- Women in archaeology
- Darwin and women
