= Margaret Conkey =

American archaeologist

Margaret W. Conkey
- Awards: Huxley Memorial Medal, Award for Advancing Institutional Excellence, Berkeley

Academic background
- Education: University of Chicago

Academic work
- Discipline: Archaeologist, anthropologist
- Sub-discipline: Gender and feminist perspectives in archaeology
- Institutions: University of California, Berkeley
- Notable works: Ancient Goddesses: The Myths and Evidence, Ancient Godesses: The Myths and Evidence

Margaret W. Conkey (born 1943) is an American archaeologist and academic, who specializes in the Magdalenian period of the Upper Paleolithic in the French Pyrénées. Her research focuses on cave art produced during this period. Conkey is noted as one of the first archaeologists to explore the issues of gender and feminist perspectives in archaeology and in past human societies, using feminist theory to reinterpret images and objects from the Paleolithic Era or the late Ice Age.

She is Professor Emerita of Anthropology (formerly, Class of 1960 Professor and Director of the Archaeological Research Facility) at the University of California, Berkeley. She was named by Discover magazine in their 2002 article, "The 50 Most Important Women in Science".

Over the years she has continued her dedication to feminist perspectives in archaeology, having organized major conferences, editing books and numerous articles on the topic. Conkey has also urged recognition of women in the history of the archaeological discipline.

== Biography ==
Conkey, the eldest of five siblings, graduated from Mount Holyoke College in 1965 with an ancient history and art history double major, and shortly got the chance to go to Jordan - in what is now the West Bank - to work in biblical archaeology. When she then submitted graduate applications to the anthropology departments at the University of Chicago and the University of Pennsylvania, she was told she needed to take a year of undergraduate anthropology (which was not available at Mount Holyoke College) before they could grant her a final admission. She and a friend then spent a summer in New York, where she obtained a job with the Wenner-Gren Foundation for Anthropological Research as a librarian and eventually became a grant analyst. When accepted at the Oriental Institute, she went back to Chicago to attend and work a part-time job as an editorial assistant at Current Anthropology.

Earning her Ph.D. in anthropology at the University of Chicago in 1978, she then taught at San Jose State University for six years, and joined the anthropology faculty of SUNY-Binghamton in 1977, where she also served as co-director of Women's Studies. She accepted an associate professorship in anthropology at Berkeley in 1987. Alongside her fieldwork, other research topics and publications have addressed pedagogy and the teaching of archaeology; the development and use of internet resources in the teaching of Introduction to Archaeology (having received several instructional technology grants for this); as well as initiating and implementing an archaeology outreach program in local schools.

In July 1997, Conkey was named the Class of 1960 Professor of Anthropology, a rare endowed chair.

== Archaeological work ==
Conkey has pursued a continued interest in the interpretation and study of Paleolithic art, the theory and social contexts of rock art research, and bringing together the different types of observations and research that have been used in the field under different theoretical umbrellas (including practice theory and feminist theory).

=== Gender in Paleolithic art ===
Conkey encourages archaeologists to rethink the possible meanings of Paleolithic images - that cave paintings represented not only an artistic revolution, but a social one that made these images a critical part of sustaining these Paleolithic communities; in which women were involved in more aspects of early life than commonly thought. She challenges the long-standing theory that cave art was a primarily male practice, and was sympathetic magic to ensure success while hunting, saying that “[w]e can't explain 25,000 years of material by saying it was all related to hunting." She points out that the animals depicted in painting on the walls and the animal remains in food refuse pits nearby are often different species - this implies that their paintings likely carried more cultural or social meaning than just being about food.

The combined interests in prehistoric art, especially that of Paleolithic Europe, and gender and feminist archaeology, has also involved recent research and publication concerning "goddess" figurines, especially of ancient Europe, in collaboration with Berkeley colleague Ruth Tringham.These investigate how the archaeological stories about these figurines have been taken up (often problematically) by contemporary popular culture.

=== Research in the French Pyrénées ===
Conkey has been carrying out the field research project titled “Between the Caves” in the French Pyrénées since 1993, focused on the Paleolithic era and on contextualizing the rich archaeological evidence of art and material culture found in the region's caves.

Two long-standing issues in archaeology have been preservation and selection biases - caves especially offer rich sources of both. They are ideal conditions to have preserved artifacts, and are easy to find. So historically, our research has always presented a very cave-centered portrait of Paleolithic life, one in which people in the Paleolithic seemed to just land in cave sites, and then suddenly showed up at some other site. Archaeologists acknowledged that these people obtained their food from out in the open and that they did not live in the caves year-round, but they also seemed to think that activity wasn't going to be interesting or archaeologically fruitful. Yet in the early 1970s, American archaeologists were using a new open-air method of surveying the outside landscape for archaeological artifacts. This method hadn't yet been used in Europe, so Conkey suggested a new project in which they would be looking for materials - for Paleolithic research, stone tools - out on the landscape as opposed to within caves.

“They said, “You won’t find anything.” I said, “Why won’t I find anything?” They said, “Nobody’s really found anything or reported anything.” I said, “Has anybody looked systematically?” They said, “Well, no.” They thought I was nuts.” - Margaret Conkey

Yet, evidence does exists that Paleolithic people spent less time in caves than we imagined in the past. For example, seasonal occupation evidence can sometimes be inferred from animal bones. Looking at found animal teeth, it can be, archaeologists can tell at what season of the year the animals were killed. Other animals are only available at certain times of the year - like fish who spawn in certain seasons. Overall, it's clear that people were in caves for maybe a couple of months a year at the most, and almost all of these caves are described by archaeologists as seasonal (occupied in the autumn or winter months). So Conkey and her teams did what had been ignored for a century; they looked at the lives Paleolithic people carried out in between the cave sites in France. Before 1993, no survey had ever been done on this.

Ultimately, she hopes that this will help them better understand the social geography and landscapes of Paleolithic art. It is also a project about fundamental archaeological survey, about survey methods, and about distributional archaeology. She heads crews of varying size and doing varied intensity of survey, surveying the landscape, searching for traces of the day-to-day lives of the cave painters. Since 2006, her international team has carried out excavation of the region's first open-air site, and has uncovered more than 3000 identifiable lithic artifacts, some dating back to the Paleolithic era and distributed within a 260 square kilometer transect. This was carried out using two grants from the National Science Foundation, one from the France-Berkeley Fund, and several from the Stahl Endowment of UC Berkeley, Archaeological Research Facility. The NSF still has this program which funds high-risk projects, and allows people to undertake new and unprecedented projects with a funding source. It was a small grant - $25,000-$30,000 - for which Conkey had to develop relationships with French colleagues, as well as get permission from the regional archaeological service, and a permit.

== Diversity and equality in the field ==
Conkey has consistently challenged the notion that fieldwork is inherently masculine, and encourages fellow archaeologists to consider the myriad of ways in which gender shapes human experiences - both past and present. When in Jordan, for example, she wasn't able to do any digging in the field - because she was a young female, and all the hired workers were older men. Conkey also encourages more attention to unsung women directors such as Cynthia Irwin-Williams and Patty Jo Watson.

== Honors and awards ==
Professor Conkey became President of the Society for American Archaeology in 2009.

In 2009, she received the Chancellor's Award for Advancing Institutional Excellence from Berkeley, for her work for diversity and equal opportunity. She has also won the Distinguished Teaching Award (1996) and the Award for Educational Initiatives (2001) and has leveraged the start-up funds for a Multi-Media Teaching Laboratory for the Department of Anthropology.

In 2017 she was awarded the Huxley Memorial Medal of the Royal Anthropological Institute.

== Publications ==
- "Archaeology and the Study of Gender" (1984) (With Janet D. Spector)
- Engendering Archaeology:Women and Prehistory (1991) (With Joan M. Gero)
- The Uses of Style in Archaeology (New Directions in Archaeology) (1993) (With Christine Ann Hastorf)
- Programme to Practice: Gender and Feminism in Archaeology. Annual Review of Anthropology (Vol. 26: October 1997) (With Joan M. Gero)
- Symbolism and the Cultural Landscape (1980) (With Lester B Rowntree)
- Ancient Godesses: The Myths and Evidence (1998) (With Ruth Tringham, Lyn Meskell, Joan Goodnick Westenholz, Karel van der Toorn, Fekri A. Hassan, Mary E. Voyatzis, Caroline Malone)
- Beyond Art: Pleistocene Image and Symbol (1997) (As editor, with Olga Soffer, Deborah Stratmann, Nina G. Jablonski)
- Perspectives on Anthropological Collections from the American Southwest: Proceedings of a Symposium (Anthropological Research Papers) (As editor, with Ann Lane Hedlund)

== Filmography ==
Year	Title	Role	Notes
2002	Sex BC	Herself	TV Mini-Series documentary from Optomen Television

== See also ==
- Feminist archaeology
- Gender archaeology
