= Navajo Nation Heritage and Historic Preservation Department =

Navajo cultural heritage regulatory body

The Navajo Nation Heritage and Historic Preservation Department is the Navajo Nation’s cultural heritage regulatory body which is responsible for providing guidance on Navajo fundamental laws, as well as laws and policies relating to preservation and archaeology. The main function of the NNHHPD is to regulate activities pertaining to project management, land-use planning, and cultural resource management and ensuring that Navajo traditional concerns are addressed in these undertakings.

Based out of Window Rock, Arizona, the department is under the direct supervision of the Navajo Nation Division of Natural Resources (DNR) and is currently responsible for overseeing cultural resource compliance and permits, geographic information system (GIS) mapping, archaeological and environmental field services, and the Glen Canyon Dam Adaptive Management Program (GCDAMP) in collaboration with the Bureau of Reclamation (BOR).

== History ==
Earliest examples of Navajo involvement in archaeological excavations date back to 1896 during the Chaco Canyon excavations led by Richard Wetherill. The first iteration of a Navajo archaeology department was a small research office established within the Navajo Nation Museum in 1972. The office’s opening coincided with the passing of the Navajo Tribal Antiquities Law (Resolution CJA-16-72). The law imposes penalties for the unlawful excavation and sale of antiquities found on tribal lands and establishes the Navajo Nation Museum as the permanent repository for Navajo cultural materials.

In the late 1970s the number of archaeological projects on the Navajo Reservation had increased significantly, with this list of projects including the Black Mesa Archaeological Project and the Navajo Indian Irrigation Project (NIIP). In response to the growing number of projects, the Navajo Nation Council established the Navajo Nation Cultural Resource Management Program (NNCRMP) which was designed to oversee all archaeological activity on the Navajo Reservation. The program was initially based out of Farmington, New Mexico and an additional office was opened in Window Rock, Arizona in 1978. By 1979, the NNCRMP had become more directly involved in Navajo governmental affairs and was responsible for historic preservation compliance as required by the Archaeological Resources Protection Act (ARPA) of 1979. Additionally, the Navajo Nation began publishing the Navajo Nation Papers in Anthropology in order to facilitate a wider distribution of NNCRMP works.

By 1988, the NNCRMP had grown to the point where it could no longer represent the Navajo Nation in the compliance process effectively. In response the Navajo Nation Cultural Resources Protection Act (CMY-19-88) Title 19 bifurcated the program into two separate departments: The Navajo Nation Archaeology Department and the Navajo Nation Historic Preservation Department (HPD). The NNAD was responsible for conducting field work including archaeological surveys and excavations, while the HPD oversaw review and compliance under the National Historic Preservation Act (NHPA) (Section 101 and 106). That same year the NNAD in cooperation with Northern Arizona University (NAU) established its first Student Training Program to address the shortage of Navajo and Native American students and senior staff in the field of archaeology, including in the NNAD itself. This program has been highly successful and has graduated several Indigenous students since its founding, including Ora Marek-Martinez, who went on to serve as the Department Director for the NNHHPD from 2014-2016.

In 1990, the NNHPD gained further control of their cultural resources by successfully contracting with the Bureau of Indian Affairs (BIA) under Public Law 638 to provide its own historic preservation services on tribal land. In 1993, the NNHPD established its second student training program in cooperation with Fort Lewis College in Durango, Colorado. And in 1997, the Navajo Nation was able to establish a Tribal Historic Preservation Office (THPO) within the NNHPD through a deal with the National Park Service (NPS). Through this agreement the Navajo THPO took over the duties outlined in section 101b of the NHPA, which were originally the responsibility of the State Historic Preservation Office (SHPO).

In 2016, due to budgetary shortfalls, the Navajo Nation Council passed resolution no. RDCO-79-16 which combined the NNAD and HPD into a single department called the Navajo Nation Heritage and Historic Preservation Department (NNHHPD). This Department is under the direct supervision of the Navajo Nation Division of Natural Resources and oversees both field work and compliance and review in relation to archaeological research carried out on Navajo Tribal Lands.

== Navajo cultural resource management ==
In addition to the CRM work conducted by the NNHHPD, the Navajo Nation has directly invested in the development of Navajo Nation-owned private CRM firms. BRIC is a subsidiary of the Diné Development Corporation which is involved in environmental compliance, natural resource management, and cultural resource management. BRIC has also helped to develop the Diné Gray & Pape Joint Venture, which is a cooperative effort between BRIC and Gray & Pape Heritage Management to provide CRM services to public and private industry clients.

The development of Navajo Nation owned and operated CRM firms allows for greater Navajo involvement in the private sector of archaeology, ensuring that Indigenous voices are heard in this sphere of archaeological field work and research.

== Navajo Indigenous archaeology ==
One of the primary goals of the NNHHPD is to conduct archaeological surveys and site documentation in a manner that is respectful of and shaped by Navajo systems of belief. At the same time, when cultural resource management is conducted by Navajo archaeologists rather than non-Indigenous archaeologists, it reinforces Indigenous sovereignty and their right to be stewards of their own cultural heritage. NNHHPD’s emphasis on Navajo belief systems and Navajo sovereignty are aligned with the practice of Indigenous archaeology. This is a sub-practice of archaeology that seeks to integrate Indigenous knowledge into archaeological research and enable Tribal Nations to engage in archaeology in culturally appropriate ways.

For the Navajo Nation, practicing Indigenous archaeology includes recognizing that archaeological sites consist of the material remains and possessions of people who are long dead. As such, they are places which need to be respected and left alone according to Navajo beliefs relating to avoidance of the dead. During cultural resource management projects the NNHHPD practices non-invasive documentation of sites through non-destructive pedestrian surveys along with ethnographic interviews of community members in the region set to be developed.
