= Community archaeology =

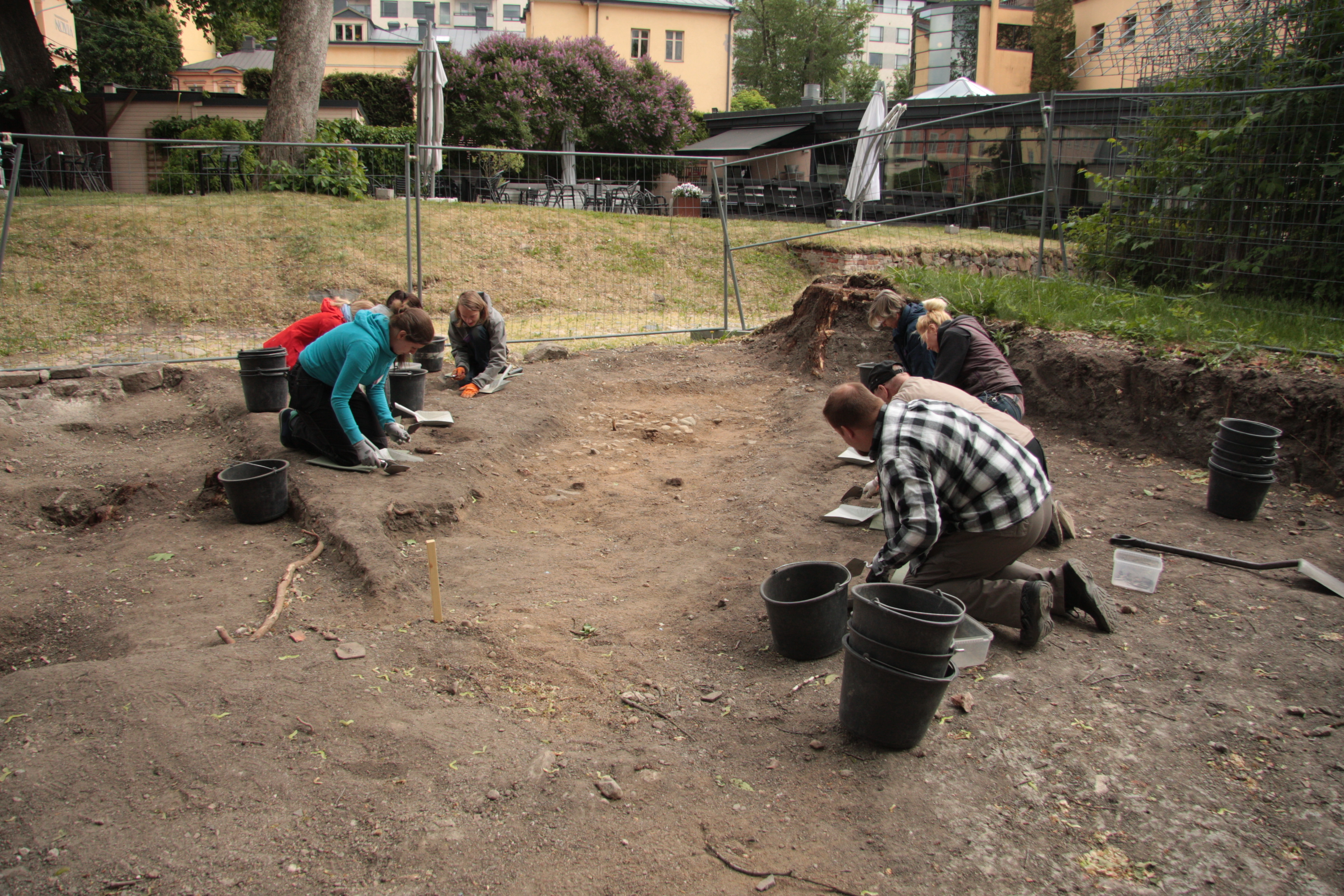
Community archaeology participants at Aboa Vetus & Ars Nova Museum in Turku, Finland.

Community archaeology is archaeology by the people for the people. The field is also known as public archaeology. There is debate about whether the terms are interchangeable; some believe that community archaeology is but one form of public archaeology, which can include many other modes of practice, in addition to what is described here. The design, goals, involved communities, and methods in community archaeology projects vary greatly, but there are two general aspects found in all community archaeology projects. First, community archaeology involves communities "in the planning and carrying out of research projects that are of direct interest to them". Second, community archaeologists generally believe they are making an altruistic difference. Many scholars on the subject have argued that community collaboration does not have a pre-set method to follow. Although not found in every project, there are a number of recurring purposes and goals in community archaeology. Similarities are also found in different countries and regions—due to commonalities in archaeological communities, laws, institutions, and types of communities. It has also been suggested that public archaeology can be defined in a broad sense as the production and consumption of archaeological "commodities".

== Community archaeology by country ==
=== Community archaeology in the United States ===
In the United States community archaeology can broadly be separated into three distinct types: projects that collaborate with indigenous peoples, projects that collaborate with other local and descendant communities, and outreach specifically for public education.

==== Indigenous peoples ====
Archaeologists have a long history of excavating indigenous sites without consulting or collaborating with indigenous peoples. Points of tension include, but are not limited to, the excavation and collection of human remains, the destruction and collections of sacred sites and objects, and archaeological interpretations that ignored or contradicted the opinions and beliefs of indigenous peoples. Even the so-called ‘father of American archaeology’ Thomas Jefferson excavated adults and sub-adults from a site still visited by indigenous people and Pilgrims plundered an indigenous grave days after anchoring at Cape Cod. Indeed, "American Indians tend to equate archaeologists with pothunters, grave looters, or, even worse, animals who feast off of the dead (i.e., the 'Vulture Culture'). Most do not trust the system supposedly designed to protect their heritage." Also, any prehistoric archaeological excavation in the Americas will involve the material products left by the ancestors of indigenous peoples of the Americas. For these reasons, community archaeology projects with both federally and non-federally recognized indigenous peoples are different from those that collaborate with local and other descent communities. Some have found that collaboration can be a means to "break down barriers" between American Indians and archaeologists, and that in collaboration "[e]ach side learns something from the other." There are many unique ways archaeological collaboration can benefit indigenous peoples. Kerber reports that:

. . . archaeology benefits American Indians and First People of Canada, respectively, by contributing important historical information; assisting in land claims; managing cultural resources and burial for protection from current and future impacts; promoting sovereignty; offering employment opportunities through field work, interpretive centers, and tourism; educating the young; aiding in nation (re-)building and self-discovery; demonstrating innovative responses of past groups to changing environmental and social circumstance; and providing populations themselves with skills and experience in doing archaeology. Clearly, collaborative archaeology is not a panacea for the difficulties facing indigenous groups, but in certain situations . . . it can be a powerful tool

Dean and Perrelli have noted that collaboration with indigenous peoples is only new "from the perspective of the dominant culture" and that "American Indian people have been cooperating and collaborating with their neighbors and visitors for hundreds of years." Some have argued that archaeologists should attempt to collaborate and repatriate materials to non-federally recognized tribes in addition to federally recognized ones. Blume has contended that when collaborating with indigenous peoples, projects should design "forms of public outreach specifically for" those audiences. Many recognized and non-recognized tribes have explicitly asked archaeologists for consolation and collaboration. Two particularly well known examples of indigenous collaboration are Janet Spector's book What does this Awl Mean and the Ozette Indian Village Archeological Site. Collaborations have occurred throughout the United States, including with indigenous peoples in Alaska. Many tribes have also begun hiring full-time tribal archaeologists.

==== Local and descendant communities ====
Many other community archaeology projects occur in the United States aside from those with indigenous peoples of the Americas. These projects focus on local communities, descendant communities, and descendant diasporas. A goal of some of these projects has been to recover and publicly present forgotten aspects of the race relations in local communities—such as histories of slavery and segregation.

==== Public education ====
As a form of public outreach and collaboration, many archaeology projects in the United States have taken steps to present their work in schools and to children. These projects vary from a "one time" presentation to local schools, to long-term commitments in which public education is an intricate part of the research design.

=== Community archaeology in the United Kingdom ===
==== History ====
Community archaeology in the United Kingdom has existed for many years, although only recently has it come to be known by that name. The roots of archaeology in the United Kingdom lie in the tradition of antiquarian and amateur work, and many county or locally based archaeology and history societies founded over a century ago have continued to enable the involvement of local people in archaeology. Up until the 1970s volunteers often had opportunities to initiate or take part in archaeological investigations. Since then the recognition that more investigations were required by the subsequent establishment of archaeological units eroded some of these opportunities; more significantly the introduction of archaeology to the legalities of the planning process through Planning Policy Guidance note 16 (PPG16) and the full professionalization of archaeology, has made public participation in archaeology extremely limited.

==== Public participation ====
Archaeology (including historic buildings, landscapes and monuments, as well as ‘traditional’ archaeology) is about people and the discovery of the past. As a subject, archaeology in the United Kingdom has been increasingly brought into the public eye in recent years. The most common form of community archaeology in the United Kingdom has come from the grass roots level. Local groups are smaller than the large, county societies, and operate in their own area and at their own pace. The work produced is often of a high standard, reflecting the amount of time and effort local people are willing to put into local projects they themselves initiated. Increasingly, over the last two decades, public participation has been pushed aside by developer-led, commercial archaeology, with the bulk of work going to contracting units. The reasons behind this relate to the professionalization of the discipline and the implementation of PPG16, as discussed by Faulkner who proposed a return to community-led archaeology in his article entitled "Archaeology from below". A recent investigation carried out by the Council for British Archaeology identified the main perceived barriers to public participation, gave examples of good practice in encouraging public participation, and made several recommendations for future improvements. Its first recommendation was the establishment of full-time Community Archaeologist posts across the country, as it states, "such dedicated posts represent a very effective way of stimulating and guiding public participation at a local level." One of the longest running and most successful community archaeology projects is based in Leicestershire. Leicestershire County Council (which incorporates the museum service) established the project in 1976 and today they have 400 members within 20 local groups across the county. Peter Liddle (Keeper of Archaeology) is the Community Archaeologist and was probably the first to use the term ‘community archaeology’ as the title for his fieldworker's handbook.

In addition to the general benefit from volunteering, community archaeology and heritage volunteering also help to bring particular wellbeing benefits.

==== The Valletta Convention ====
The Valletta Convention affects the work of non-official or amateur groups who have been, or are, investigating their local historic environment. The European Convention on the Protection of the Archaeological Heritage (Revised) was signed in Valletta in 1992, and ratified by the UK government before coming into force on 21 March 2001. Article 3 of the document caused considerable debate as it stated that all archaeological work should be carried out by suitably qualified, authorized people. This form of ‘licensing’ for archaeologists already exists in the rest of Europe, where it has limited the work of voluntary archaeologists and local societies.

=== Community archaeology in Australia ===
Australian Archaeology has a long history of community archaeology, with established disciplines and laws. In her review of community archaeology, Marshall found that there is an "antipodean dominance" in field community archaeology, suggesting that Australian community archaeology may be more established as a discipline than in other countries. This is reflected in anthologies on community archaeology in Harrison and Williamson and Sarah Colley. Generally Australian community archaeology projects have involved collaboration between archaeologists and aboriginal tribes similar to archaeologists in the United States collaborate with American Indians.

=== Community archaeology outside of the United States, the United Kingdom, and Australia ===
Hundreds, if not thousands, of community archaeology projects have occurred throughout the world—including in Brazil, Canada, Egypt, Mexico, the People's Republic of Bangladesh, South Africa, Thailand (Praicharnjit 2006, www.archaeopen.com) and Turkey.

== Communities ==
=== Definitions ===
In a reduced sense, communities are aggregations of people that "are seldom, if ever, monocultural and are never of one mind." "For understanding the goals of community archaeology projects it is helpful to classify these communities into three broad and overlapping types. That is local communities, local descent communities, and non-local descent communities or diasporas."

=== Local communities and non-local descent communities ===
Descent communities are those ancestrally linked to a site. Descent communities located within proximity of the site are local descent communities, and non-local descent communities "are groups that are linked to a site, but that live in another location, potentially hundreds or even thousands of miles away." Archaeological collaborations with local descent communities include those that focus on proto-historic sites and collaborate with American Indians ancestrally linked to them, or plantation excavations that incorporate collaborations with the local ancestors of slaves who worked at the plantation. Examples of community projects involving non-local descent communities include those where archaeologists set up museums for non-locals to come and visit.

=== Non-descent local communities ===
Local communities are simply communities that live "either on or close to a site" and non-descent local communities are those not believed ancestrally related to the site. This category includes landowners, local volunteers, local organizations, and local stakeholders. Some feel that many of the major issues in community archaeology are applicable to non-local descent communities, and that these collaborations are crucial for archaeologists seeking to understand the local social context of their work.

== Major issues ==
=== Decolonization of archaeology ===
Archaeology is a practice whose history is entrenched in colonialism, and many archaeologists and communities contend that archaeology has never escaped its colonial past. A major goal of many community archaeologists and community archaeology projects is to decolonize archaeology. In decolonizing archaeology, archaeologists are trying to give communities more control over every stage in the archaeological process. For example, some programs have begun attempting to bring Indigenous leaders together globally to discuss shared methods for decolonization through archaeological collaboration. Community archaeology, the sharing of archaeological knowledge, and the below major issues have been viewed as a crucial parts of decolonization. Publishing with open access licenses to enable anyone to read archaeological literature without financial barriers is another aspect of decolonization.

=== Self-reflexivity ===
Community archaeology can alleviate or prevent violence towards communities that archaeology may cause. Self-reflexivity in archaeology can be thought of as looking into a metaphorical mirror, and includes attempts to make explicitly make visible the violence—such as colonization—archaeology has been implicitly part of. Self-reflexivity in archaeology can be part of community presentation, as a means of breaking down imbalanced power dynamics between non-academic communities and archaeologists. Self-reflection amongst archaeologists—such as discussion with community members, writing field journals, and professional writings about self-reflection—can also be a means for identifying unethical and violent aspects of archaeological projects.

=== Public outreach ===
Public outreach, in archaeology, is a form of science outreach that attempts to present archaeological findings to non-archaeologists. Public outreach is usually a crucial aspect of most community archaeology projects. Public outreach can take many forms, from a onetime presentation to a local school to long-term agreements with local communities in developing intricate public outreach programs. Many feel that archaeology and archaeological findings have been greatly distorted by the popular media and through western associations, and that public outreach is the only way non-archaeologists will be able to understand what archaeologists actually do and find. On another level, public participation can mean local people taking part in training excavations, and this type of involvement results in a hands-on learning experience in archaeological techniques.

== Approaches to community archaeology ==
=== Community interpretation ===
Interpretation of archaeological findings by the community is a quintessential aspect of community archaeology, and is viewed as an important aspect of "decolonizing archaeology" and giving non-archaeologists power to interpreting the past. Multiple community archaeologists have created projects that give the community a major role in the interpretation and dissemination of archaeological information. Community participation is not relegated to the interpretation of discoveries but includes contributions to any aspect of archaeology—such as theory and project goals. Community involvement ends the exclusive control that archaeologists have had over the material past, and gives non-archaeologists a chance to interpret the past. Many archaeologists now argue that the incorporation of local knowledge is important to archaeology's survival as an academic discipline. The degree of interpretive control communities have in archaeological projects vary from using interpretations garnered from interviews and consultations, to academic publication written by community members based on community identified research questions.

=== Long-term commitment ===
Ethnographers and development specialists have shown that a long-term relationship is necessary to develop a rapport and mutual respect with the local community, and argue that to succeed at collaboration archaeologists must make a long-term commitment in order to understand the dynamics of the social context of their research. Without this depth of knowledge archaeologists risk making decisions with unintended consequences. For example, collaborations and repatriations have been more successful where archaeologists and American Indians have met on a regular basis and developed both friendship and mutual respect. Versaggi found that "allowing the process to take time is what matters." Many community archaeologists now plan on conducting long-term collaborations from the outset of their project.

=== Ethnography and getting to know the community ===
As a method for knowing the community, archaeologists have advocated the use of ethnographic methods in community archaeology projects. While most scholars feel that it is not necessary for all archaeologists to become trained ethnographers, a degree of ethnographic knowledge is needed before initiating a project. Some community archaeology projects rely on ethnographic data conducted by members of their research team, while others have had some success beginning with published sources or collaborating with professionals already established in the focal community.

=== Museums and institutions ===
The construction of museums or other institutions as education centers, repositories for archaeological materials and, centers for scientific and socio-cultural collaboration with a community is a common long-term goal for many community archaeology projects, and one achieved with increasing frequency. Museums have become hubs for public outreach and collaboration to both local and non-local communities. One well known example of a museum created by a collaboration between American Indians and archaeologists is the Mashantucket Pequot Museum and Research Center, which is "the largest Native American owned museum in the United States", has multiple laboratories and collections for scientific research, and a staff that includes five full-time archaeologists.

=== Publications for the community ===
Another method in community archaeology for the sharing and distribution of archaeological knowledge is the publication or presentation of materials specifically for the community. This includes books, pamphlets, children's stories, school-oriented workbooks, comic books, websites, public lectures, radio programs, television shows and news coverage, dramatic reenactments, artistic and literary creations, open access publications, and other forms.

=== Participatory action research ===
Participatory action research is another method archaeologists have used in community archaeology projects.

== Critiques ==
=== Who speaks for the community? ===
In community archaeology, by definition decisions cannot be made based on the information from only a handful of members from a given community. Although the number of consultants needed will vary, it is rare that a small subgroup can speak for the community as a whole. Sometimes it is clear who should be contacted in a community. For example, archaeologists in the United States must contact the Tribal Historic Preservation Officer (THPO) before attempting collaboration with federally recognized tribes. In places where the appropriate contacts and stakeholders are less obvious, community archaeologists attempt to identify as many interest groups as possible and contact them before research begins.

=== Top-down approach ===
A top-down approach to community archaeology is when archaeologists decide before consultation what the goals of the project will be, or what benefits will be provided to the community is not really community archaeology at all. The top-down approach creates a one-sided exchange of information from the archaeologists to the community and precludes real collaboration. Blume found the "archaeologist-informant relationship [to be] essentially exploitative and patronizing because it takes place on the archaeologist’s terms—the informant must address issues that the archaeologists understand—and it excludes participation by [community members] who are unable or unwilling to participate on those terms." To succeed at community archaeology, Archaeologists have begun to undertake more reflexive collaborations with indigenous communities.

=== Carrying through with long-term commitments ===
Some community archaeologists have had difficulty sticking to their original commitments to the community.

=== Consultation and collaboration ===
Some have argued that ‘consulting’ archaeologists do not relinquish control over the process of interpretation, and that consulting is a ‘top-down’ approach to collaboration. Also, some definitions of the word ‘collaboration’ make allusions to opposed and/or warring parties cooperating with one another during tense or bellicose times. Dean has proposed that the word cooperate be used instead.

== See also ==
- Indigenous peoples of the Americas
- Applied anthropology
- Archaeological ethics
- Science outreach
