= Janet D. Spector =

American archaeologist

Janet D. Spector (October 21, 1944 – September 13, 2011) was an American archaeologist known for her contributions to the archaeology of gender and ethnoarchaeology.

== Early life ==
Spector was born and raised in Madison, Wisconsin. The neighborhood she grew up in was called Nakoma and like most other things in her community was rooted in Native American culture. Although she lived on the corner of Shawnee Pass and Cherokee Drive and frequently walked with her grandfather through the Native American mounds situated in Vilas Park, the history of her surroundings was never made explicit to her. She also spent a lot of time as a young girl digging for treasure in her neighbors trash cans or down at the local creek, fascinated by the potential story a discarded item could tell. She attributes her subsequent career in anthropology to this childhood love for finding things coupled with an environment saturated in Native American history that she desired to learn more about.

== Education ==
In 1964 Janet attended the University of Wisconsin and promptly enrolled in anthropology courses but was unimpressed with the quality and content of the classes. At the beginning of her second year things began to fall into place when a TA to one of her lab courses introduced her to Joan Freeman, the Director of Archaeology at the Wisconsin State Historical Society. Through this meeting Janet was offered the opportunity to work in a field school run by Freeman and her colleague Jay Brandon. She joined a team of graduate students and had her first experience in conducting fieldwork at a site in Wisconsin called Aztalan. She worked with the program throughout her undergraduate years until earning her B.A in anthropology. Her lifelong experiences in archaeological fieldwork began her second year of her undergrad and included sites in Wisconsin, Minnesota, Israel, and Canada.

Soon after, she enrolled again at the University of Wisconsin for graduate school. Before earning her master's degree, she dropped out for a year to start a free school in Madison with a group of fellow anthropology students and one faculty member. Her interest in issues of pedagogy began at this time and motivated her throughout the rest of her career. Often paralyzed by anxiety herself, the movement spoke to her directly in that she wanted to create more nurturing and trusting learning environments.

Upon returning to her graduate studies she conducted fieldwork in Israel from 1969 to 1970 through a program with the University of Arizona. Her work abroad shifted her motivation towards more contested issues of the time like the anti-war and feminist movements. In 1970 she earned her M.A in archaeobotany. She returned to the University of Wisconsin for her PHD.

== Career ==
While completing her PHD she began her career as a professor in the Department of Anthropology at the University of Minnesota. In her 25 years there she helped found the women's studies program and chaired the program from 1981 to 1984. She was also awarded the Horace T Morse University of Minnesota Alumni Association Award for Outstanding Contributions to Undergraduate Education in 1986. Other noteworthy accolades from her time as a faculty member include her role as assistant provost which saw her chairing a Commission on Women and penned the Minnesota Plan II. In this role, Spector also contributed to founding the Center for Advanced Feminist Studies.

An influential paper she co-wrote in 1984 entitled "Archaeology and the Study of Gender" is considered to be one of the foundational texts of feminist archaeology. She is also the author of the 1993 book What This Awl Means: Feminist Archaeology at a Wahpeton Dakota Village, which combines Spector's autobiography with the excavation of the Little Rapids site (also known as Inyan Ceyaka Otonwe) in Scott County, Minnesota and a fictional story of a young Dakota woman who lived in the village. The book was revolutionary in its attempt at a task differentiation framework and its intersectional approach to ethnography with Indigenous and gendered perspectives at the forefront.

She served on the advisory board for the American Anthropological Association's project on "Gender and Archaeology" from 1986 to 1988 where she co-wrote an essay on "Incorporating Gender into Archaeology Courses" that was designed to bring feminist anthropology into the classroom. In 1998 she presented her essay "Reminiscence" at the "Doing Archaeology as a Feminist" seminar at the School for Advanced Research.

== Death ==
Spector died on September 13, 2011.

== Selected publications ==
- J.D. Spector 1993. What This Awl Means: Feminist Archaeology at a Wahpeton Dakota Village. Minnesota Historical Society Press.
- J.D Spector and M.K. Whelan 1989. Incorporating gender into archaeology courses. In Gender and Anthropology: Critical Reviews for Research and Teaching, ed. Sandra Morgen (Washington, D.C.: American Anthropological Association, 1989), pp. 65–94.
- M.W. Conkey and J.D. Spector. 1984. Archaeology and the study of gender. Advances in Archaeological Method and Theory 7: 1–38
- J.D. Spector 1983. Male/ Female Task Differentiation Among the Hidatsa: toward the development of an archaeological approach to the study of gender. In P. Albers and B. Medicine.The Hidden Half: Studies of Plains Indian Women.
