= Sarah Colley =

British archaeologist

Sarah Colley FSA is an honorary research fellow in the University of Leicester, school of Archaeology and Ancient History. She was elected as a Fellow of the Society of Antiquaries of London in 2011.

Colley is interested in using modern digital communication technology and applies them to enhance researches in the field of archaeology. Because of that interest, she is currently working with Penelope Allison on the development of digital research resources in the Kinchega Archaeological Research Project.

== Education ==
Colley obtained a bachelor of arts in archaeology at University of Southampton in 1977 and graduated with a PhD from the school of archaeology, University of Southampton in 1984. After completing her PhD Colley went on to become a postdoctoral researcher at the Australian National University on the topic of Australian Aboriginal archaeology.

== Career ==
She has been a senior lecturer of archaeology at the University of Sydney, and has published articles about teaching archaeology to students in the university level. As a senior lecturer, she was able to develop teaching and researching programs in Archaeological ethics and theory, Cultural heritage management, public archaeology, Australian Aboriginal pre-history and Historical archaeology. Colley has specialized in studying shells, fish bones and mammals to try and better understand early humans' diets, economies and environmental changes. She has worked in sites in England, Scotland and south east Australia. She currently manages the Archaeological Fish Bone Images Archive Tables, Archaeological fish-bone images and NSW Archaeology Online: Grey Literature Archive.

== Selected publications ==
- Colley, Sarah (2007). University-based archaeology teaching and learning and professionalism in Australia. Washington, D.C.: Smithsonian Institution Press. pp. 251. ISBN 978-1588340580.
- Colley, Sarah (2018). "Arable weed seeds as indicators of regional cereal provenance: a case study from Iron Age and Roman central-southern Britain". World Archaeology. 36 (2): 189–202. doi:10.1080/0043824042000260979. S2CID 144410104.
- Colley, Sarah (2014). "Ethics and Digital Heritage". The Ethics of Cultural Heritage. New York, NY: Springer. pp. 13–32. doi:10.1007/978-1-4939-1649-8_2. ISBN 978-1-4939-1648-1.
