= Gender archaeology =

Archaeological sub-discipline

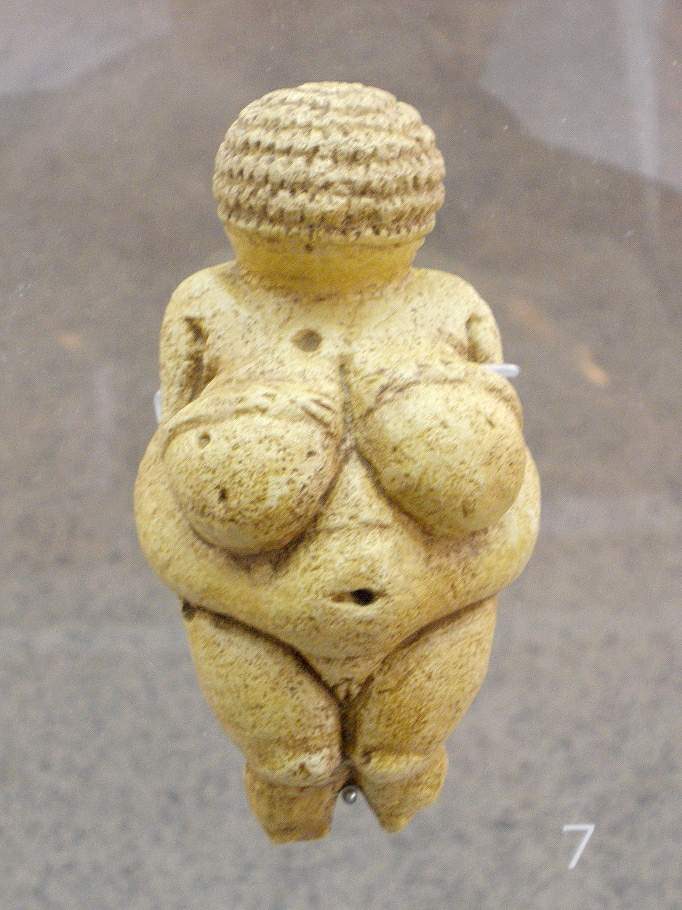
Venus of Willendorf

Gender archaeology is a method of studying past societies through their material culture by closely examining the social construction of gender identities and relations.

Gender archaeologists examine the relative positions in society of men, women, and children through identifying and studying the differences in power and authority they held, as they are manifested in material (and skeletal) remains. These differences can survive in the physical record although they are not always immediately apparent and are often open to interpretation. The relationship between the genders can also inform relationships between other social groups such as families, different classes, ages and religions.

Feminist theory in gender archaeology has presented a new perspective and identifies biases in the overall archaeological theory. This new perspective that focused on feminist viewpoint in archaeology was initiated by the rapid evolution in the 20th century, of the Western Societies outlook and interpretation of gender. The development of this perspective commenced from the late 1960s feminist movement.

Archaeologist Bruce Trigger noted that gender archaeology differed from other variants of the discipline that developed around the same time, such as working-class archaeology, indigenous archaeology, and community archaeology, in that "instead of simply representing an alternate focus of research, it has established itself as a necessary and integral part of all other archaeologies."

== Theory ==
Sex and gender are often used interchangeably in archaeological research. This dismisses the cultural constructiveness of gender by connecting it to the biological perspective of sex. Gender is present in material culture and can display how a culture was socially constructed. Archaeologists emphasizing the gender and sex dichotomy reject gender exploration within a culture and advances gender determinism. Furthermore, it promotes ethnocentrism by mirroring Western gender tradition in ancient cultures.

The feminist theory of gender archaeology gave archaeologists a new perspective of the past. This modern structure for theoretical perspective addressed many of the patriarchal biases instilled in the interpretation and excavation of past archaeology. Modern methods "treat gender as a process, not a thing". The new gender studies introduced biases in archaeological theory. This shift of focus is theorized to be from the increase in women in the archaeological field and from the change in the social interpretation of gender. Women archaeologists began in the last twenty years, focusing on how the gender roles of our ancestors are not being represented correctly and also the gender roles were not as rigid as once believed. The theory supports that prior archaeologists were not equipped to differentiate between the sex and gender of our ancestors. Due to this lack of technology, scientists made assumptions about a variety of topics including the division of labor between the sexes and past societies' views of sexual anatomy and desires. This caused a gap in our understanding of past social structures. Gender archaeology pushes for theories that are gender inclusive, unbiased, and factual.

== Feminist archaeology ==
As a response to the limited representation of female archaeologists and the invisibility of women in archaeological research, feminist archaeology was established. Feminist archaeology allows for the study of feminine roles in societies and verifying their importance. Additionally, it provides research of the women in prehistoric societies and analyzes the gendered activities that portray female agency and social engagement. Furthermore, feminist archaeology pushes a social and political agenda of female representation and the advancement of women in modern society. However, the social justice aspect of feminist archaeology tends to not be inclusive of race and class which can differentiate the experiences of a woman. Other movements such as black feminist archaeology further studies the intersectionality of race, gender, and class.

== Black feminist archaeology ==
Black feminist archaeology was created as a response to feminist archaeology and the misconceptions about black women present in archaeological research. The stories of black women, especially stories during slavery, are typically written by non-black scholars. These scholars tend to "otherize" black women and shape the stories based on pre-conceived stereotypes. The roles of black women in early archaeological writings would be based on assumptions and stereotypes. Black feminist archaeology encourages the stories of black women to be told by black female archaeologists. Giving black women cultural authority on female slavery helps eliminate further otherizing and helps deepen the understanding of the experiences encountered by black slaves. Furthermore, it allows for archaeology to be linked to a larger mission for social and political justice.

Black feminist archaeology allows archaeologists to view the roles of black women through a gendered lens. Viewing black slaves through a gendered lens provides archaeologists with the ability to explore the alternative roles of black slaves as women. For example, female slaves were often portrayed through a domineering and overbearing stereotype. Black women are often displayed as hyper-emasculating and anti-patriarchal in past archaeological research. These stereotypes were used to describe the gender roles present in captive households. Black feminist archaeologists studied the captive households without the attachment of stereotypes and concluded that captive households had a multidimensional family domestic system. Due to the conditions of slavery, women often played a dominant role in the family structure. This is due to the long hours worked by slave men, not (as previously believed) because enslaved men were absent from the home and enslaved women were anti-patriarchal.

== History ==
Archaeological research and theory often reflects the larger society at the time. Early archaeological research was often masculinized due to the dominant patriarchal society. The concept of gender was not traditionally explored in early archaeology because most research was male-centered and there was little representation of female archaeologists. Because of the masculinized make up of archaeology, racism, sexism, and ethnocentrism is often associated with the field and is prevalent in early archaeological works. Again, because archaeology often reflects the larger society, present day archaeological research is often more inclusive of gender and operates on a broader cultural landscape.

Archaeology used to be a mostly male-dominated field that discouraged gender research. But, in the last few decades with the rise of the 2nd feminist movement, female archaeology students began rejecting prior assumptions about gender and experiences in the past because they believed these assumptions distorted societies perception. The ongoing feminist movement that began in the late 1960s provoked the conception of a modern, feminized outlook on archaeology. Archaeology students were not satisfied with the limited information available about past women's roles and experiences, and the assumptions that were made for decades. So they took it upon themselves to use new technology and research how women in the past lived. They began focusing on the difference between sexuality and gender, and the importance of Intersectionality. Margaret Conkey and Janet D. Spector (1984) are considered the first in the Anglo-American field to examine the application of feminist approaches and insights to archaeological practice and theory. However, Scandinavian, and specifically Norwegian, archaeologists had already in the early seventies started to follow a processual recipe for studying gender relations both within (pre)history and the profession itself. This resulted in a workshop titled "Were they all men?" arranged by the Norwegian Archaeological Association in 1979, and a dedicated journal for feminist and gender studies in archaeology; K.A.N. Kvinner i Arkeologi i Norge [transl. Women in Archaeology in Norway] that published from 1985 until 2005.

Due to archaeology being a male-dominated field, it was prone to gender biases in research. These gender biases also apply to the topics that archaeologists investigate, with some topics more associated with women than men, such as cultural heritage, GIS, and isotope analyses. Little is known about gender roles in various ancient societies, but there is often an asymmetrical approach when depicting male and female roles in these societies. There are instances where male archaeologists have depicted the role of males of ancient times by mirroring present-day gender roles. Concepts of non-binary gender relations have been ignored due to the patriarchal structure of archaeology. For example, the figurines of the La Tolita-Tumaco culture combine male and female characteristics for a non-binary representation. Although these figurines were discovered a century ago, researchers did not acknowledge the mixed-gendering until recently because of gender biases.

Prominent archaeologists Margaret W. Conkey and Joan M. Gero detail the various ways gender is shaped in archaeological research. Gender can appear as sociobiological strategy, social construction, political economy, agency, and as an evolutionary process. These six theoretical approaches allow for the engendering of archaeology and imparts a well-developed position on gender.

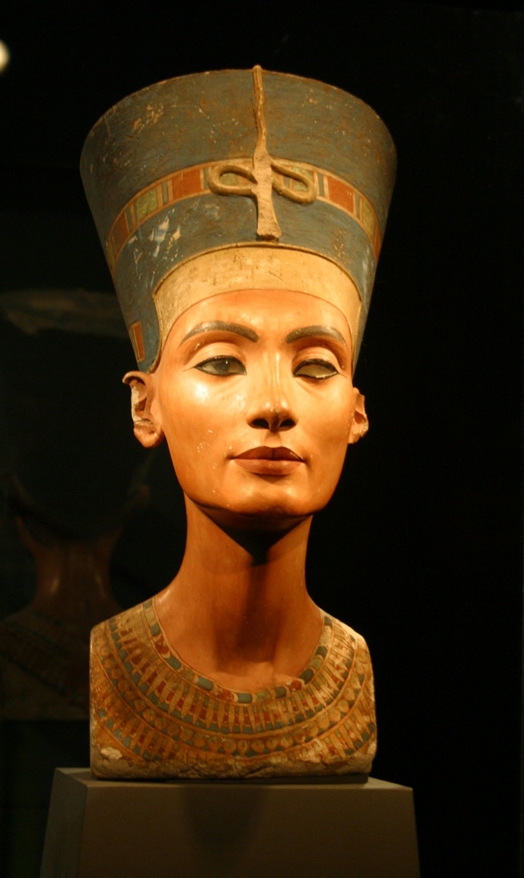
The infamous Nefertiti Bust has become a symbol of feminist power and gender-bending rule.

Although the new feminized outlook on archeology addressed detrimental biases in the analysis of past societies and made progress in the study of gender, the feminist theory created a new set of criticisms about archeological research. Some archaeologists have openly criticized gender archaeology. One of those responsible was Paul Bahn, who in 1992 published a statement declaring that:

The latest outbreak - which bears a great resemblance to the good old days of the new archaeology (primarily a racket for the boys) - is gender archaeology, which is actually feminist archaeology (a new racket for the girls). Yes, folks, sisters are doing it for themselves... Hardly a month goes by without another conference on 'gender archaeology' being held somewhere by a host of female archaeologists (plus a few brave or trendy males who aspire to political correctness). Some of its aims are laudable, but the bandwagon shouldn't be allowed to roll too far, as the new archaeology did, before the empresses' lack of clothes is pointed out by gleeful cynics.

== Gender archaeology in cross cultural studies ==
It has been argued that gender is not genetically inherited but a process of structuring subjectivities, whereas sex is biologically determinate and static (Claassen 1992, Gilchrist 1991, Nelson 1997). To some professionals in the field, however, sex is not “the ground upon which culture elaborates gender” (Morris 1995, 568–569) and “sexing biases have been identified among the methods used in sexing skeletons… When sex is assigned to a skeleton of unknown sex, it is a cultural act” (Claassen 1992, 4), pointing out the more prominent cultural biases in the field of archaeology. These philosophies make Western biological anthropological methods of determining sex of fossils, not appropriate for cross-cultural studies given that not the same physical characteristics are used by all cultures to determine an individual's sex. This approach of sexual fluidity, meaning that sex is not a cross-cultural concept and it is mostly culturally assigned, has been undermined by the wide application of DNA analysis to skeletal remains in Western archaeology. The conclusions drawn from such studies performed by Western archaeologists, will be biased by their cultural influences and concepts of sex, biology and DNA.

Hoping that analysis of both the material culture and ethnographic studies of the ancient society will provide a clearer picture of the role gender plays/played in that society, archaeologists are using more diverse types of data and incorporating other aspects of the collected data that they did not include before. Gender studies have often analyzed both males and females (Gilchrist 1991, Leick 2003), however, recent fieldwork has challenged the notion of this particular male-female dichotomy by expanding the categories to include a third or fourth gender in some non-Western societies that are explored (Herdt 1994, Hollimon 1997). Another way in which the fieldwork has challenged the usual study of gender archaeology is by analyzing more material culture like objects, activities and spatial arrangements in the landscape (Nelson 1997).

== See also ==
- List of archaeologically attested women from the ancient Mediterranean region
- Sarah Milledge Nelson
- Queer archeology
- Roberta Gilchrist
