= National Museum of Finland =

- Suomen kansallismuseo Finlands Nationalmuseum
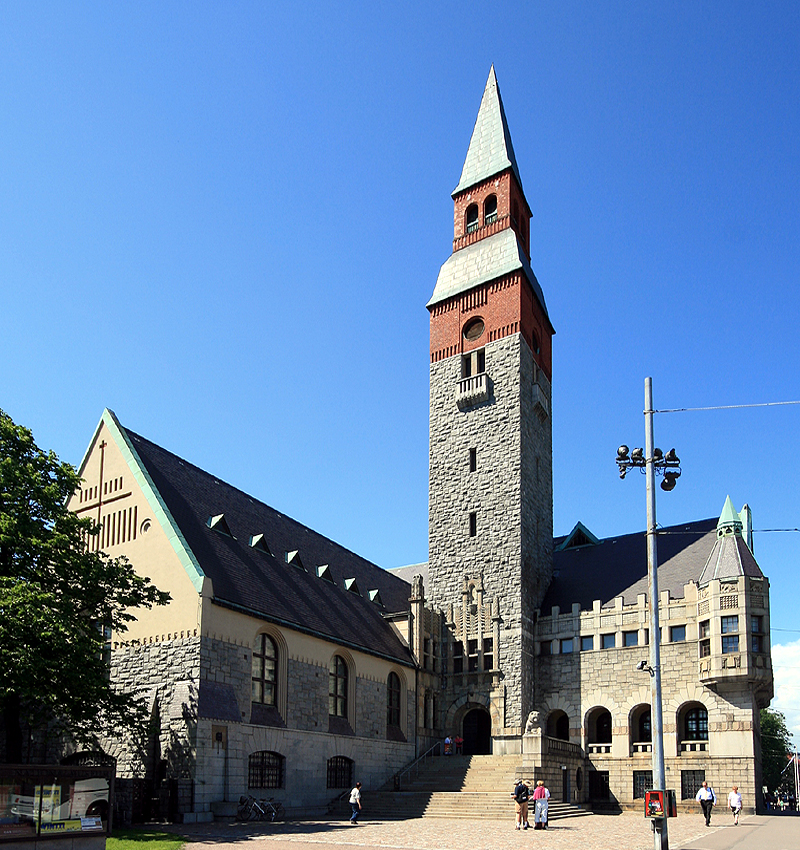
- National Museum of Finland

- Location within Finland

General information
- Classification: Museum
- Location: Helsinki, Finland, Mannerheimintie 34
- Coordinates: 60.1749°N 24.9294°E
- Construction started: 1905
- Construction stopped: 1910
- Opened: 1916
- Client: Board of Public Building
- Owner: Senate Estates

Height
- Height: tower 58 m (190 ft)

Technical details
- Floor area: Exhibition area more than 3,100 m^{2} (33,000 sq ft)

Design and construction
- Architect: Gesellius, Lindgren, Saarinen
- Main contractor: Master Builder August Pettersson and Master Builder Frans Johansson

The National Museum of Finland (Finnish: Suomen kansallismuseo, Swedish: Finlands Nationalmuseum) is a museum in Helsinki presenting Finnish history from the Stone Age to the present day, through objects and cultural history. The Finnish National Romantic style building is located at Mannerheimintie 34 in central Helsinki and is a part of the Finnish Heritage Agency (until 2018 the National Board of Antiquities) (Finnish: Museovirasto, Swedish: Museiverket), under the Ministry of Culture and Education.

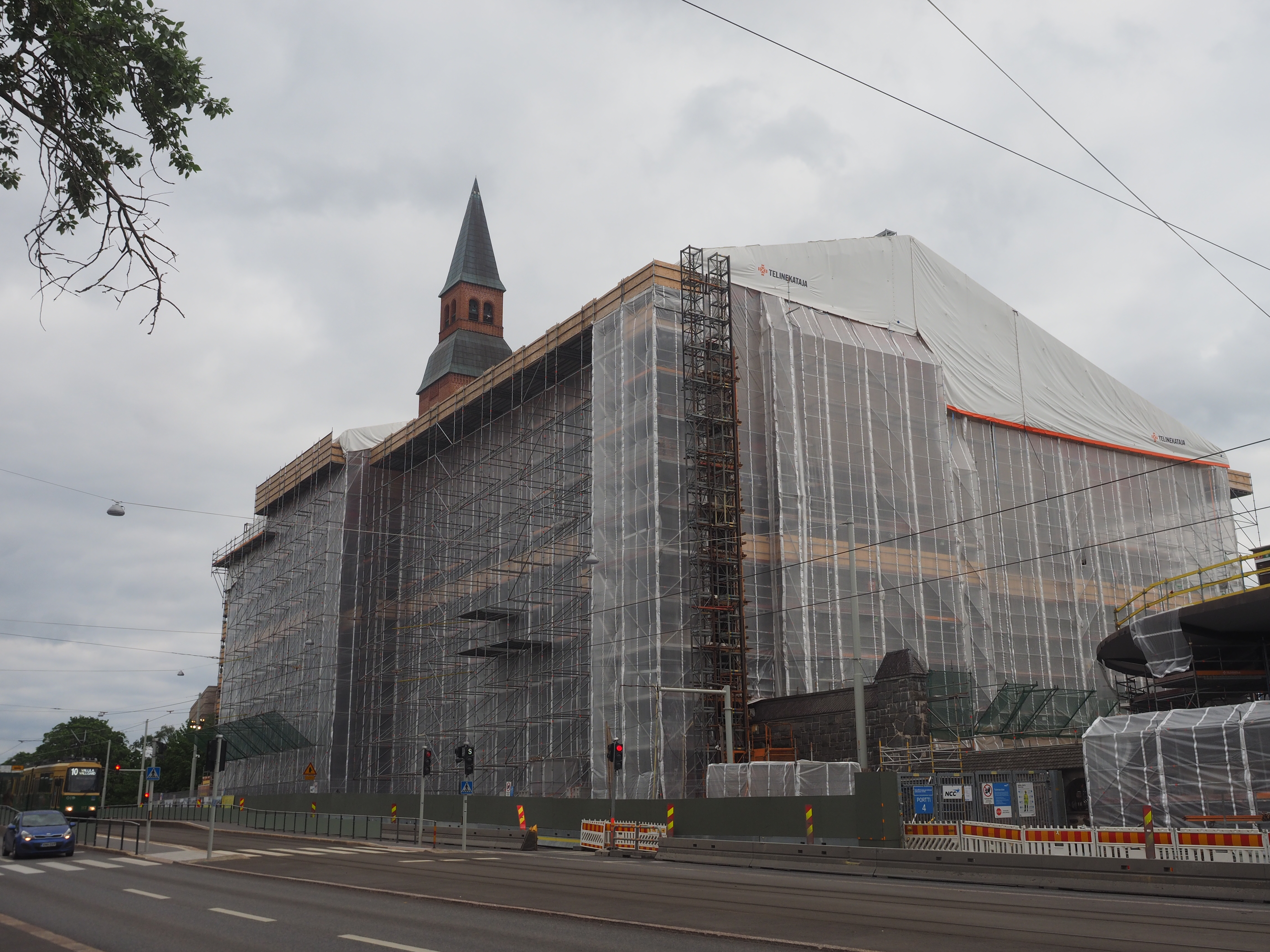
The National Museum under repairs in June 2025.

The National Museum is currently closed due to a renovation and expansion project. The museum was estimated to reopen in 2027.

== Building ==
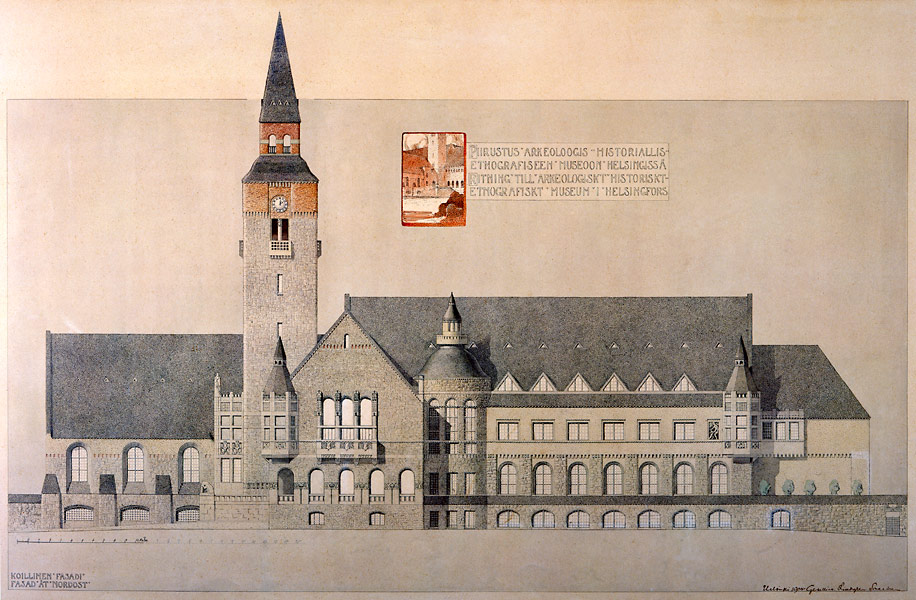
Original sketch of the building

The building of the National Museum was designed by the architect company Gesellius, Lindgren, Saarinen. The appearance of the building reflects Finland's medieval churches and castles. The architecture belongs to national romanticism and the interior mainly to Art Nouveau. The museum was built from 1905 to 1910 and opened to the public in 1916. The museum was named the Finnish National Museum after Finland's independence in 1917. After the last thorough renovation, the Museum was re-opened in July 2000.

Details of the building
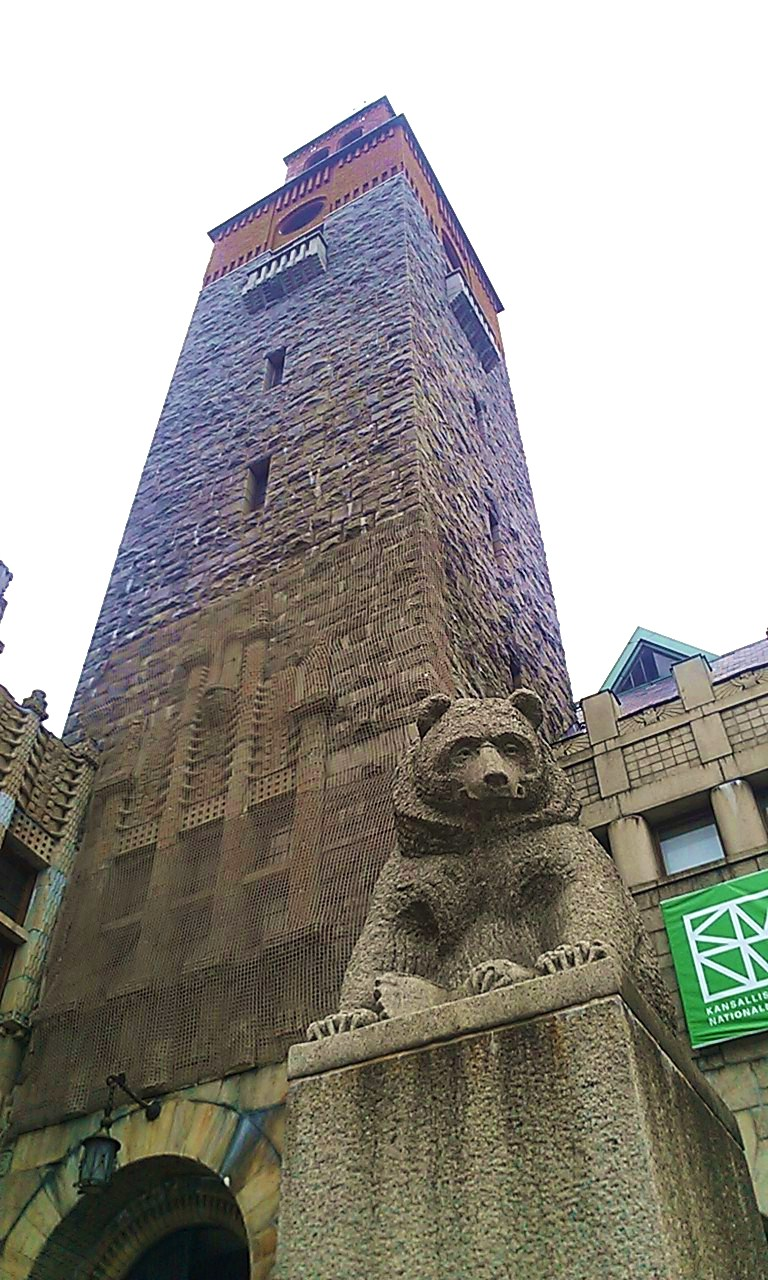
Bear statue by Emil Wikström, 1910

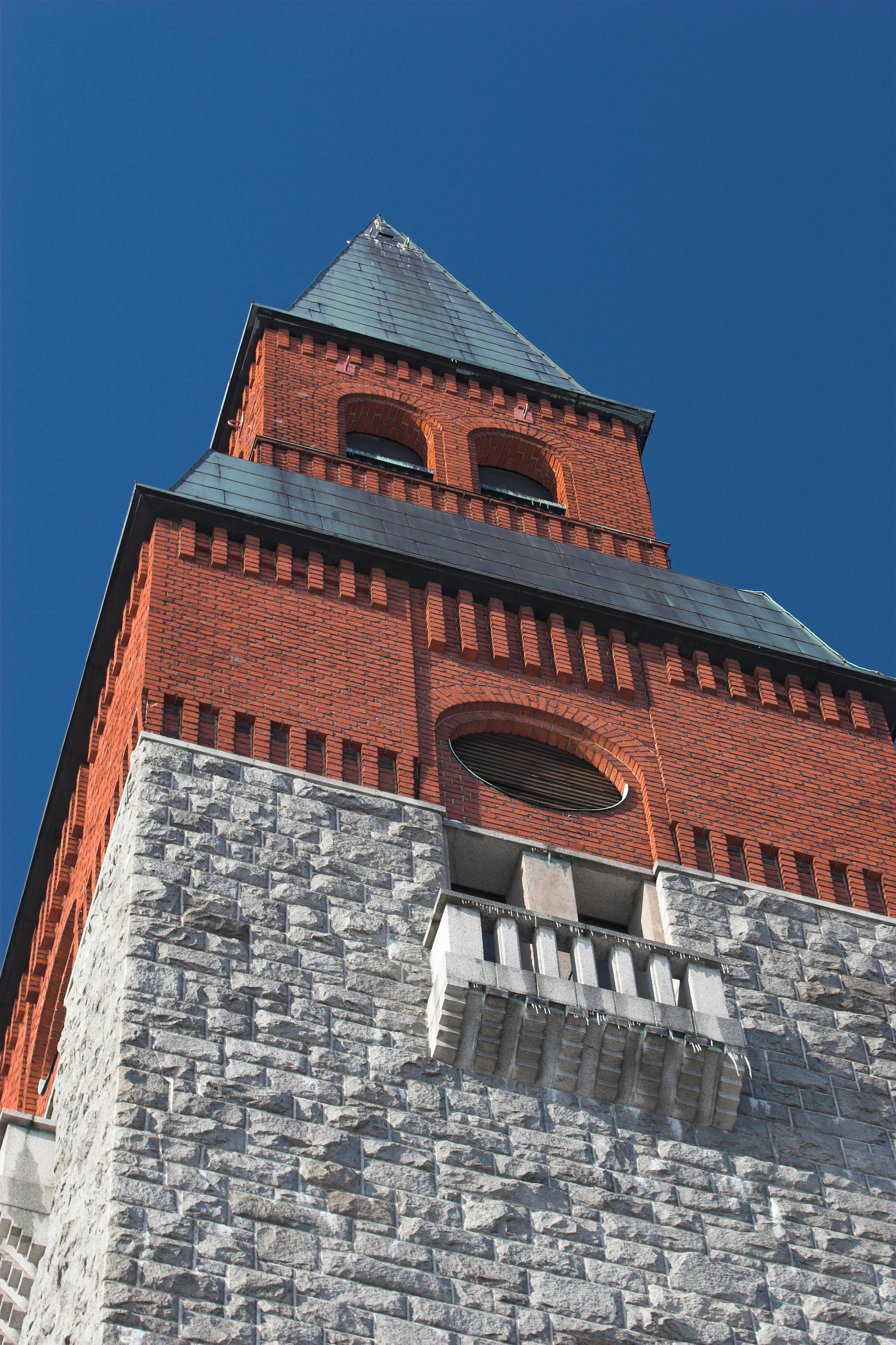
The tower

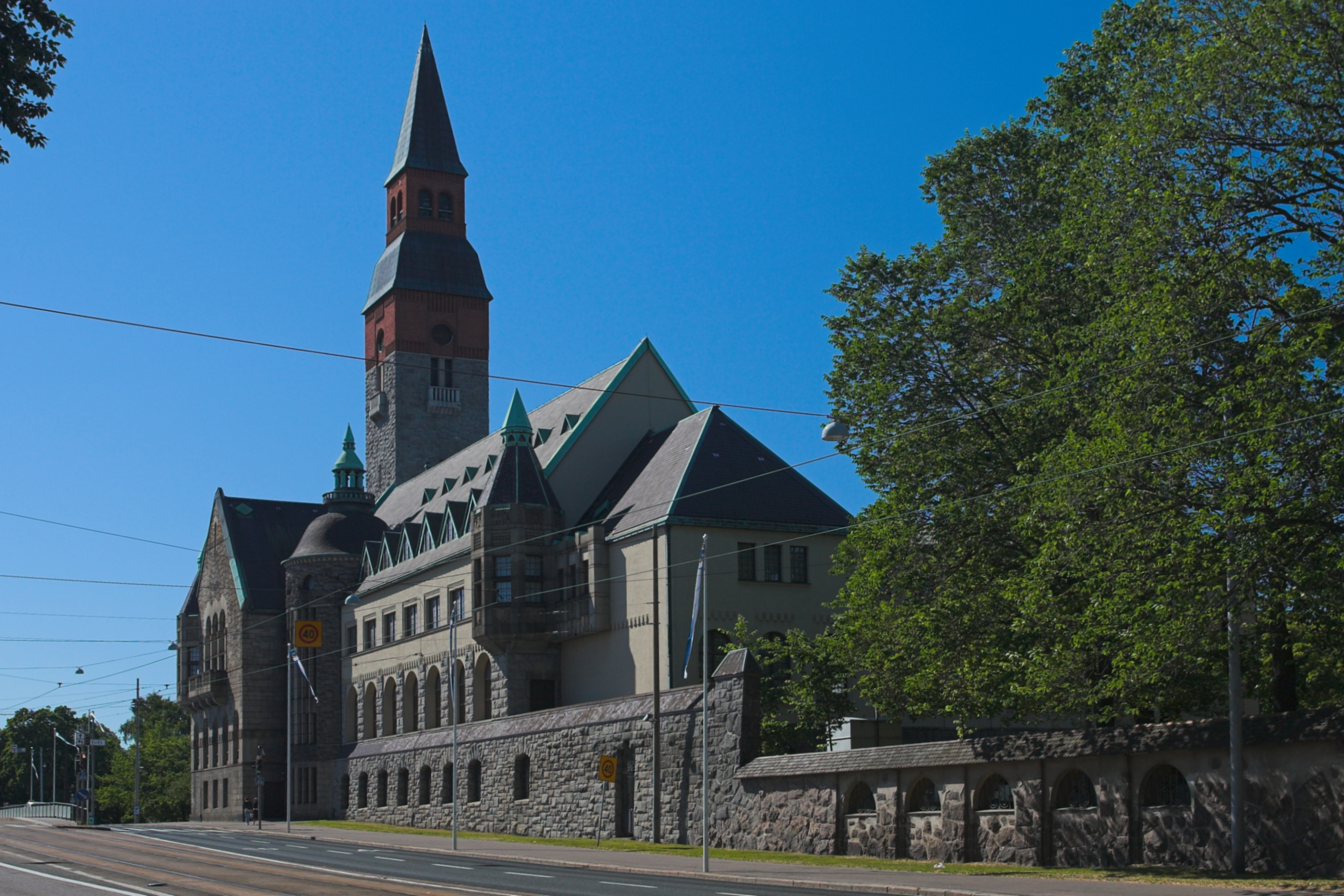
The other side of the building

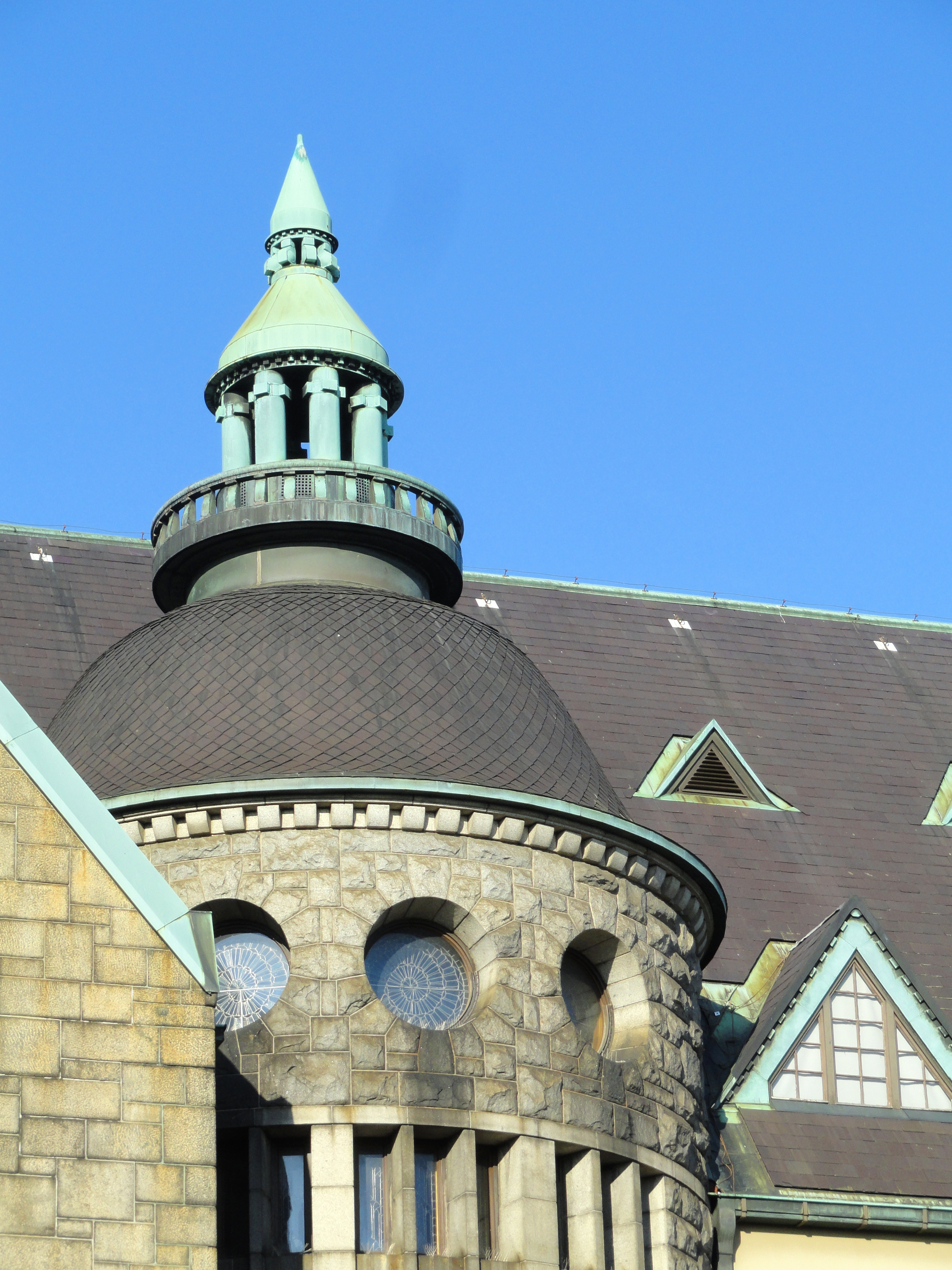
Small turret

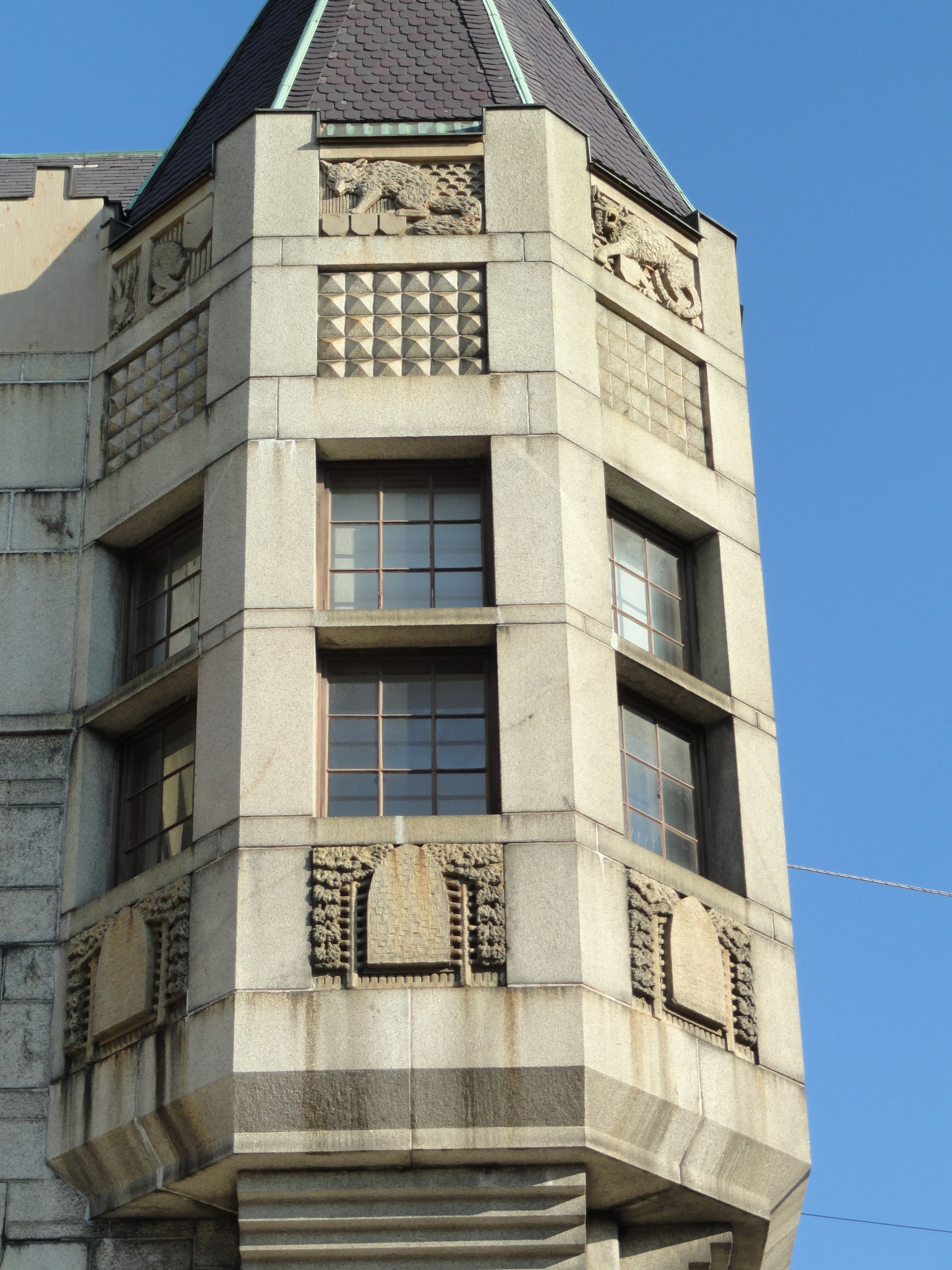
Another turret with animal reliefs

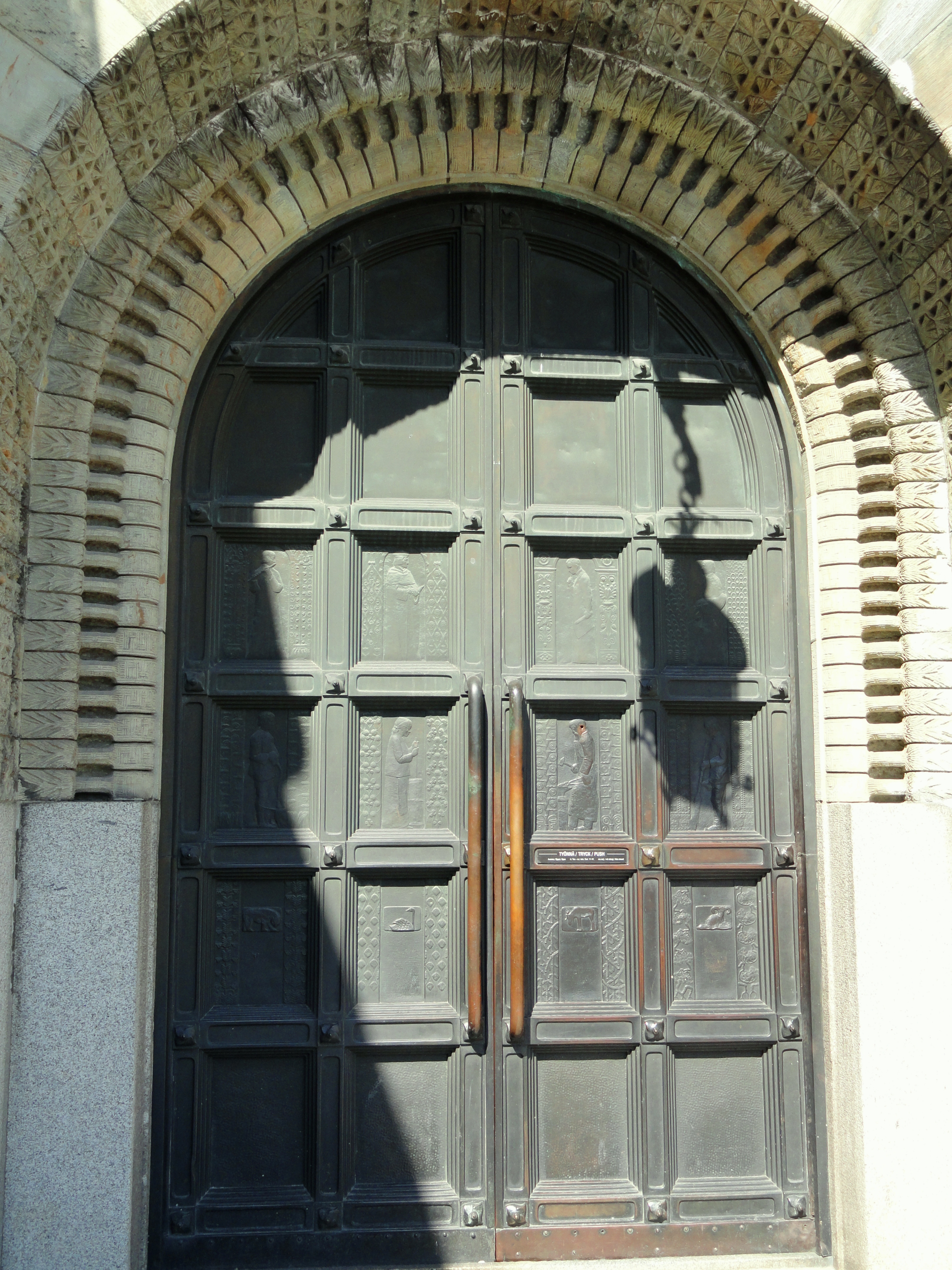
Front door

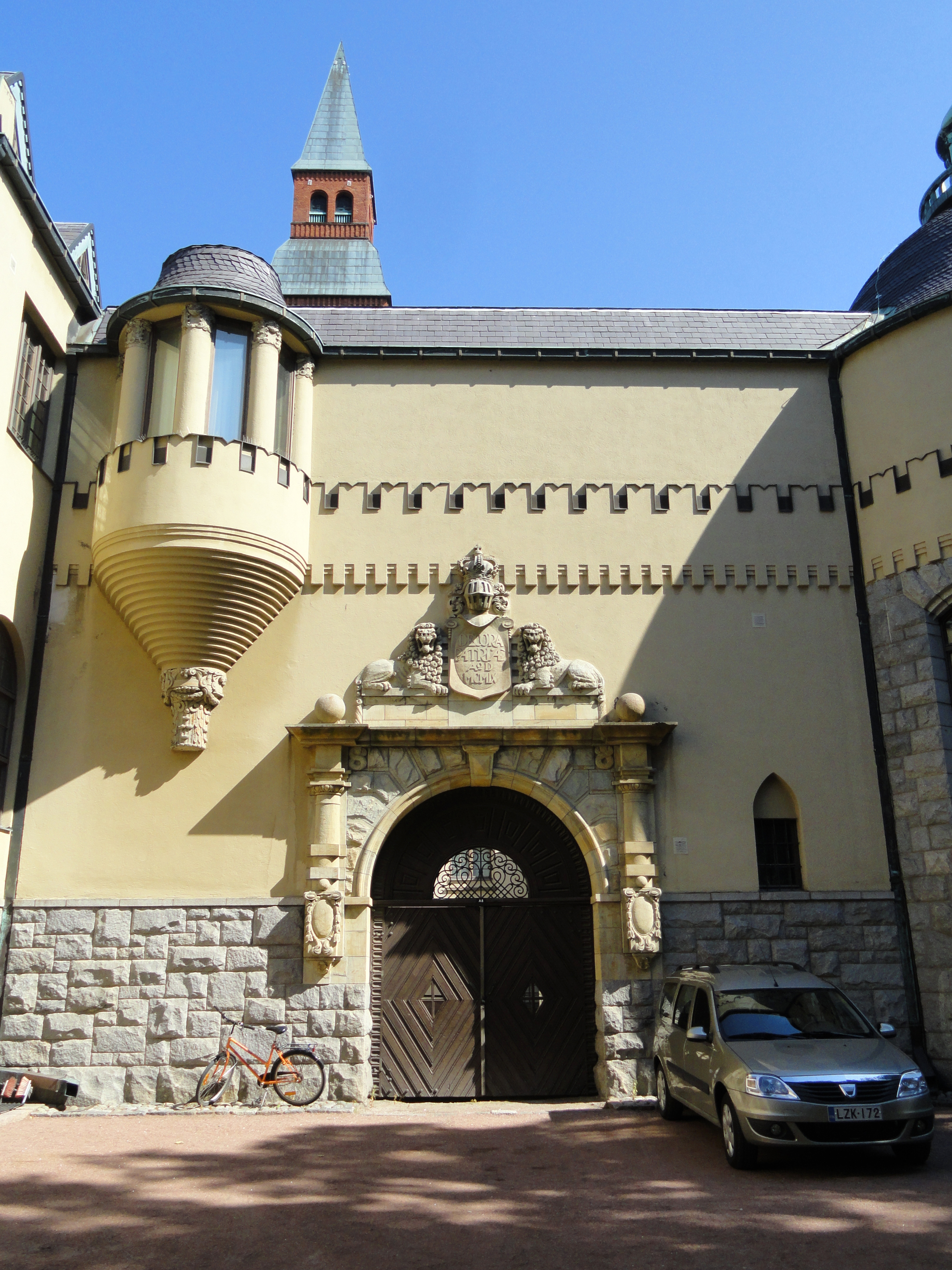
Back door

The museum's entrance hall ceiling has ceiling frescoes in the national epic Kalevala theme, painted by Akseli Gallén-Kallela, which can be seen without an entrance fee. The frescoes, painted in 1928, are based on the frescoes painted by Gallén-Kallela in the Finnish Pavilion of the Paris World Fair in 1900.

Akseli Gallen-Kallela's 1928 frescoes in the entrance hall
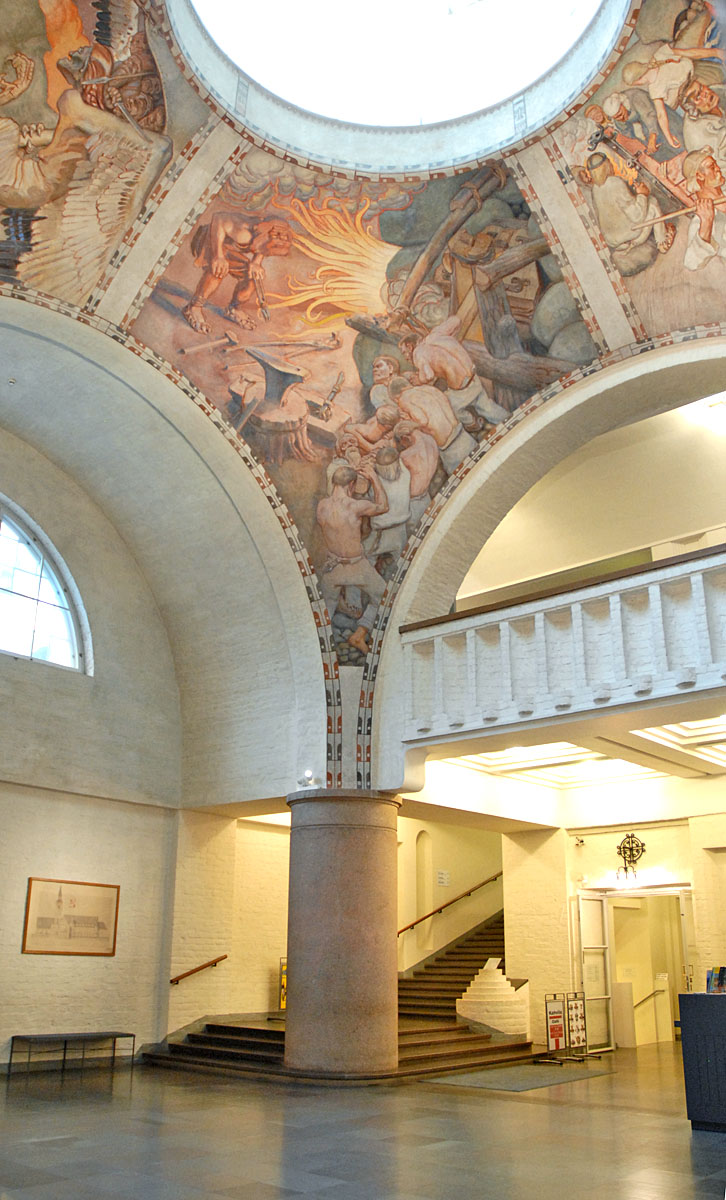
Entrance hall

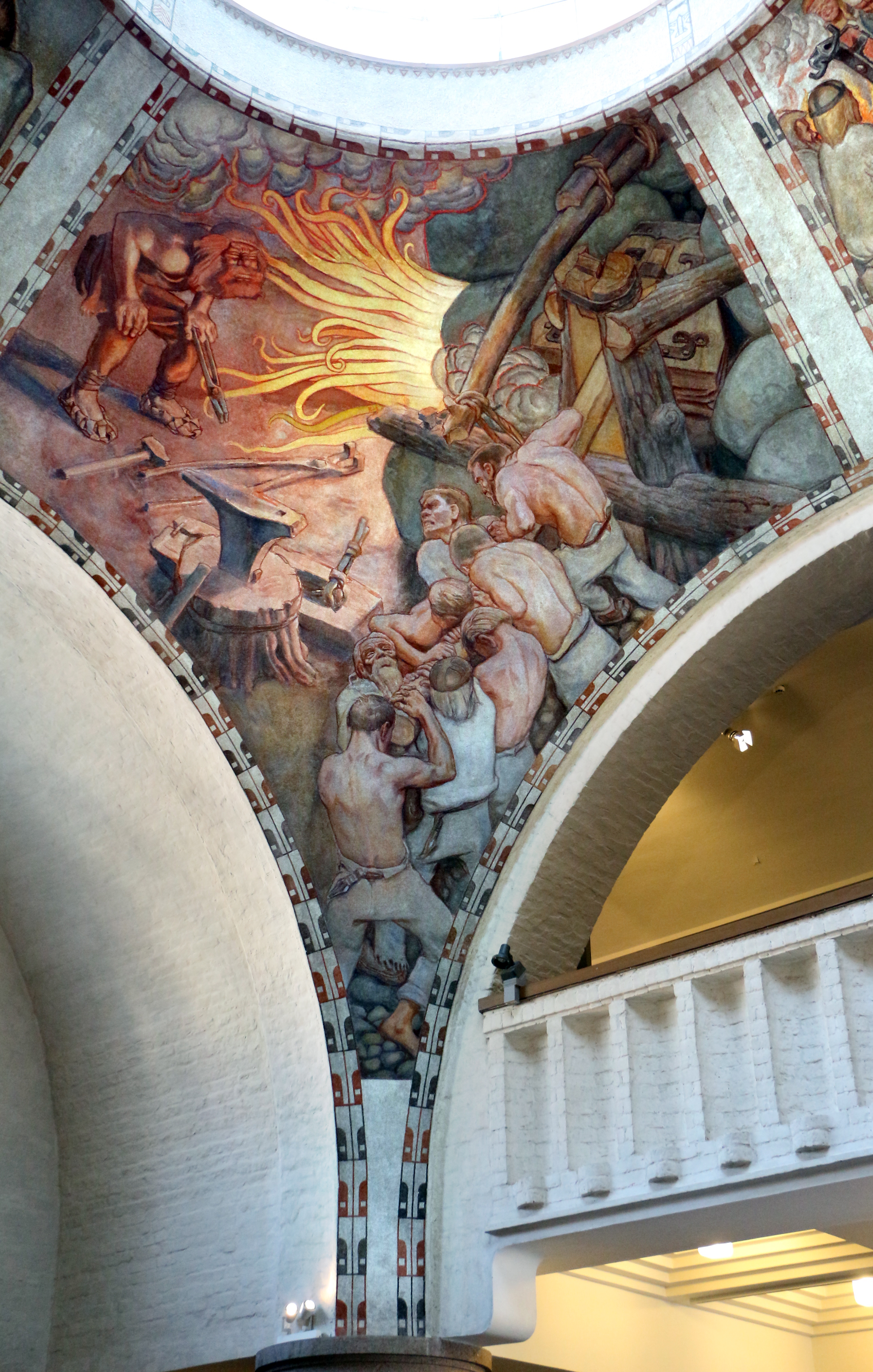
Forging the Sampo

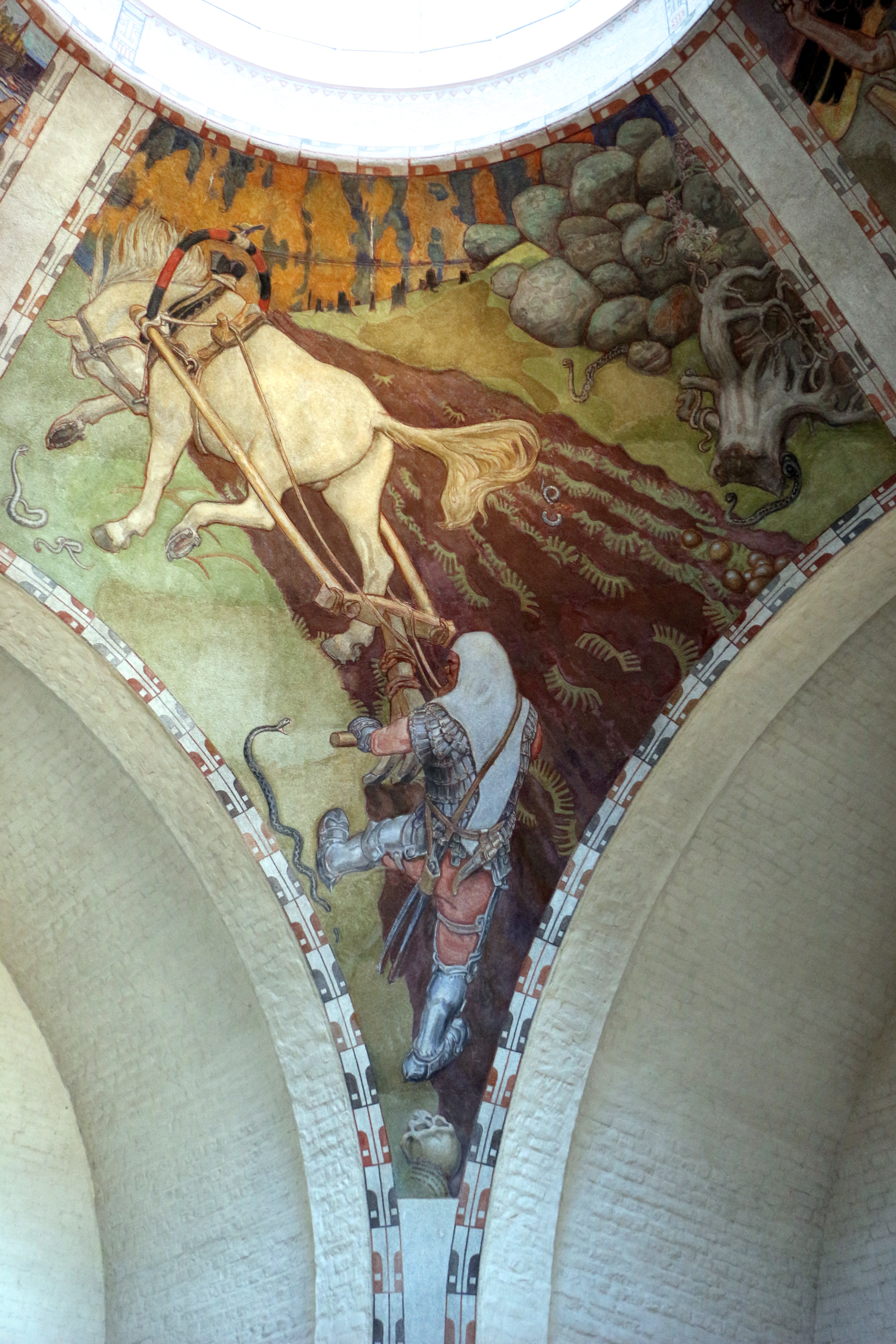
Ilmarinen Ploughing a Field of Vipers

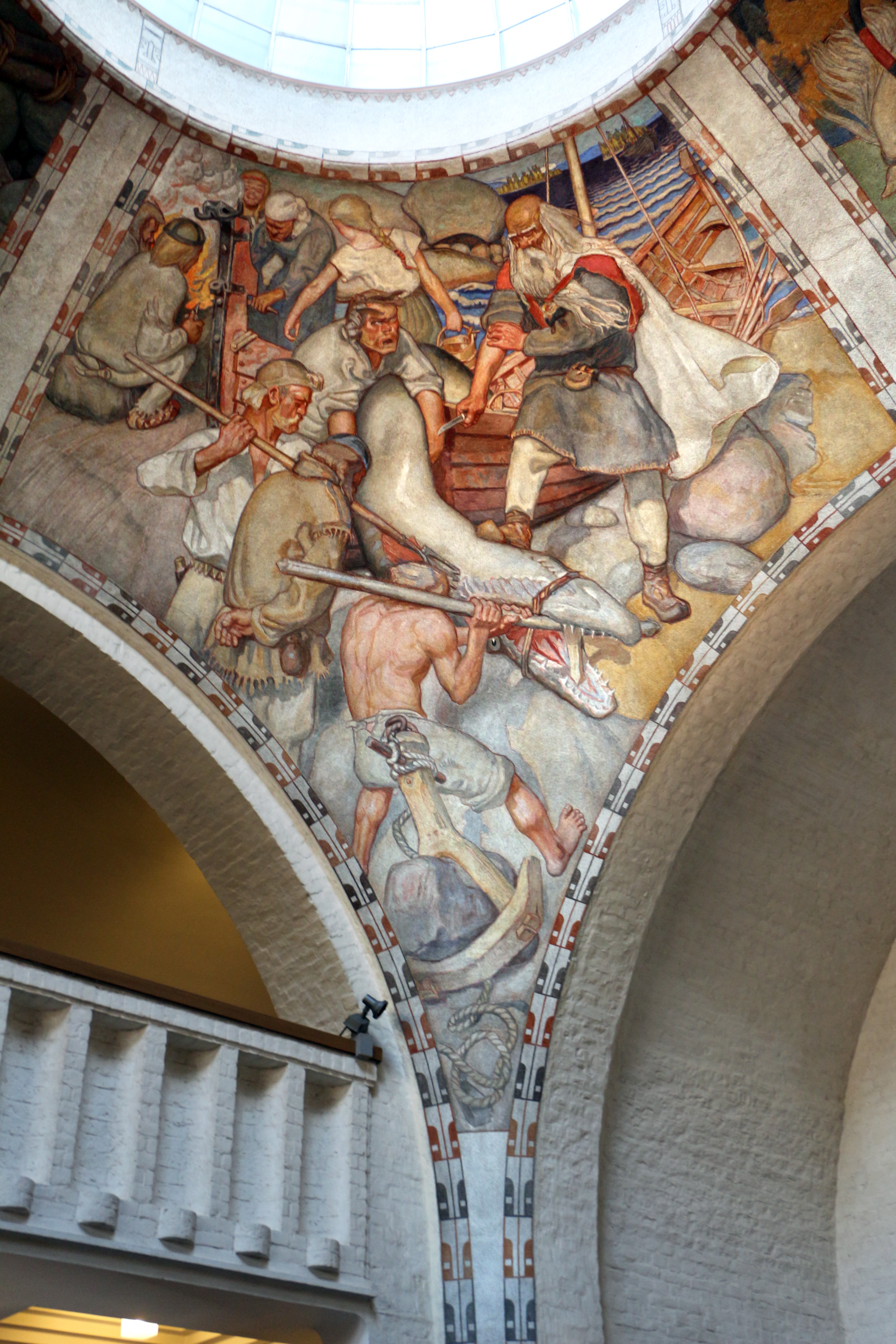
The Great Pike

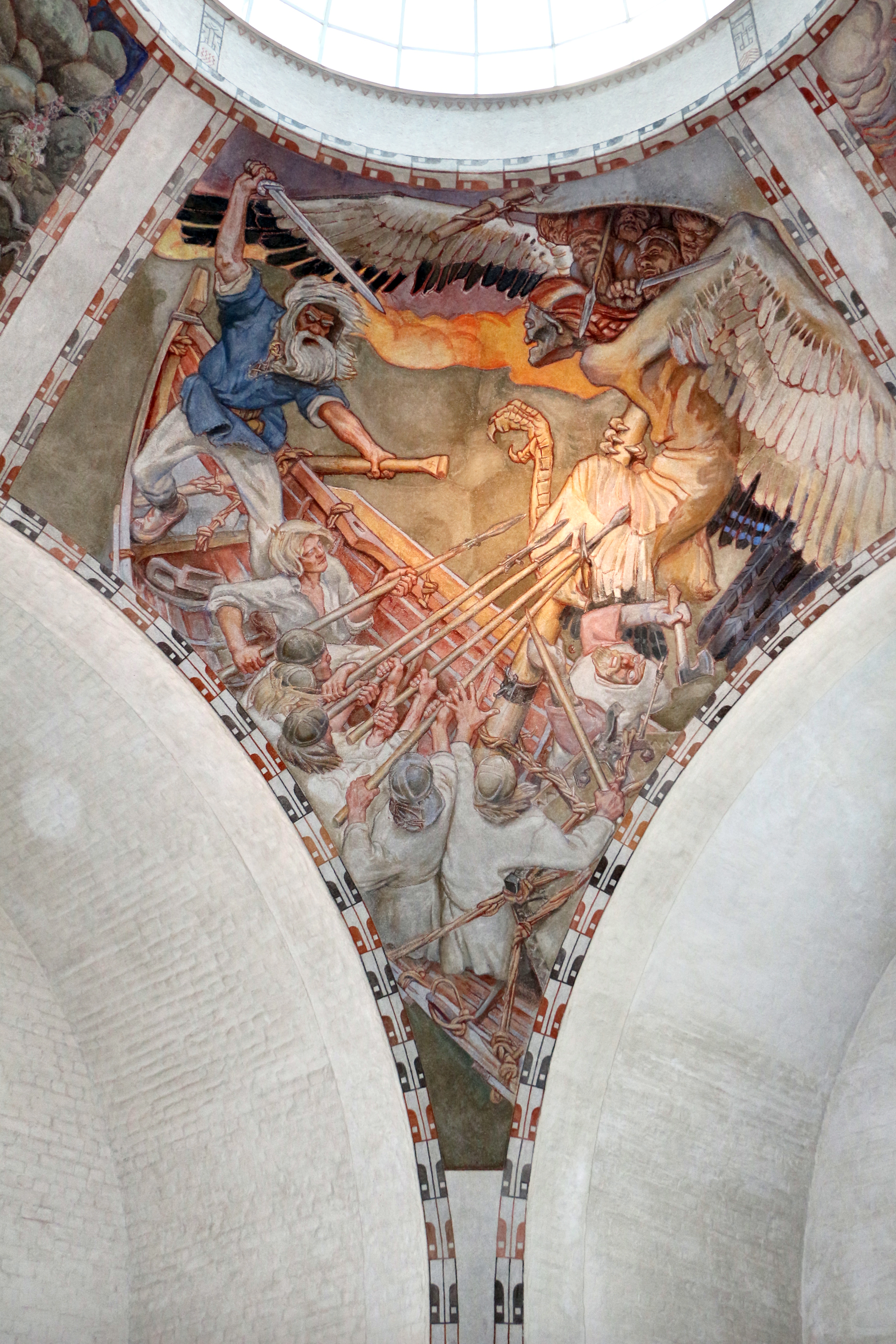
The Defence of the Sampo

== Exhibitions ==
The permanent exhibitions of the National Museum are divided into parts. There are collections of coins, medals, orders and decorations, silver, jewellery and weapons. There is prehistory of Finland, the development of Finnish society and culture from the Middle Ages 12th century to the early 20th century through the Swedish Kingdom Period to the Russian Empire Era, and Finnish folk culture in the 18th and 19th centuries with life in the countryside before the industrialisation among other exhibitions.

The collections also included the Mesa Verde artifacts from the cliff dwellings of Colorado. These were donated to the museum by the Finland Swedish explorer Gustaf Nordenskiöld. They comprised the most-extensive collection of Mesa Verde items outside the United States and one of the largest collections of native Americana outside the American continents. In 2019 it was decided to return a portion of the artifacts to the representatives of the indigenous people of the United States of America, with it agreed for some 600 items to be kept and exhibited.

== Gas explosion in the Silver Room ==
On 23 January 2006 an explosion occurred at the National Museum in the Silver Room, which was caused by methane leaking into a broom cupboard from the drainage through dried floor drain and lit by a spark from the power distribution cabinet in the cleaning closet. There were two possible sources for the methane; a leak from a gas pipe under the nearby Museokatu street, or gas that developed on its own in the sewer. Later, police investigations found the cause to be a gas pipe leak. Most display cases and 49 pieces out of more than 200 silver objects in the museum's Silver Room were damaged in the explosion, although most of them only mildly. Nobody was hurt. All objects were successfully repaired the same year. The Silver Room was re-opened to the public in early 2007.

== Gallery ==
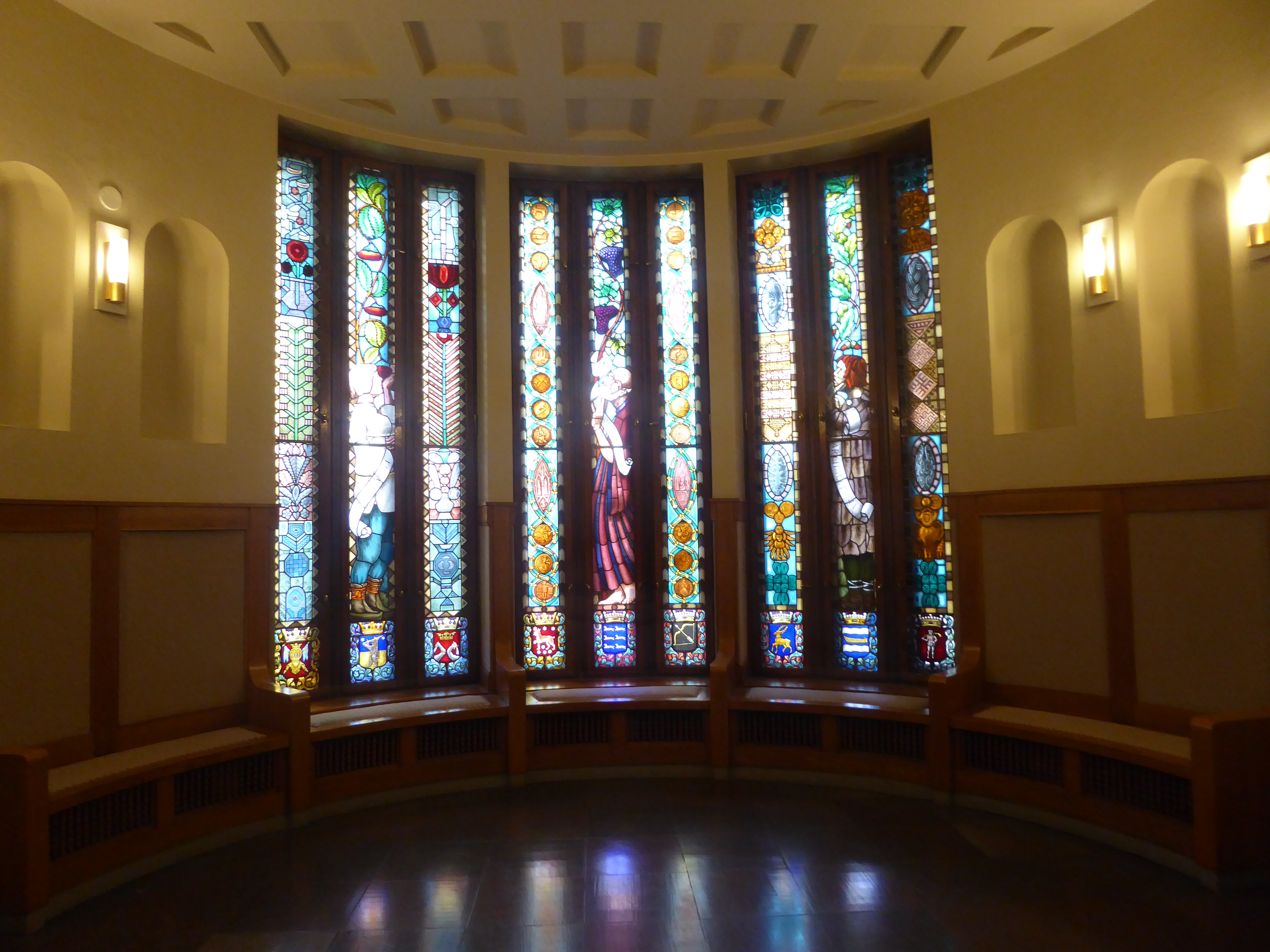
Painted glass

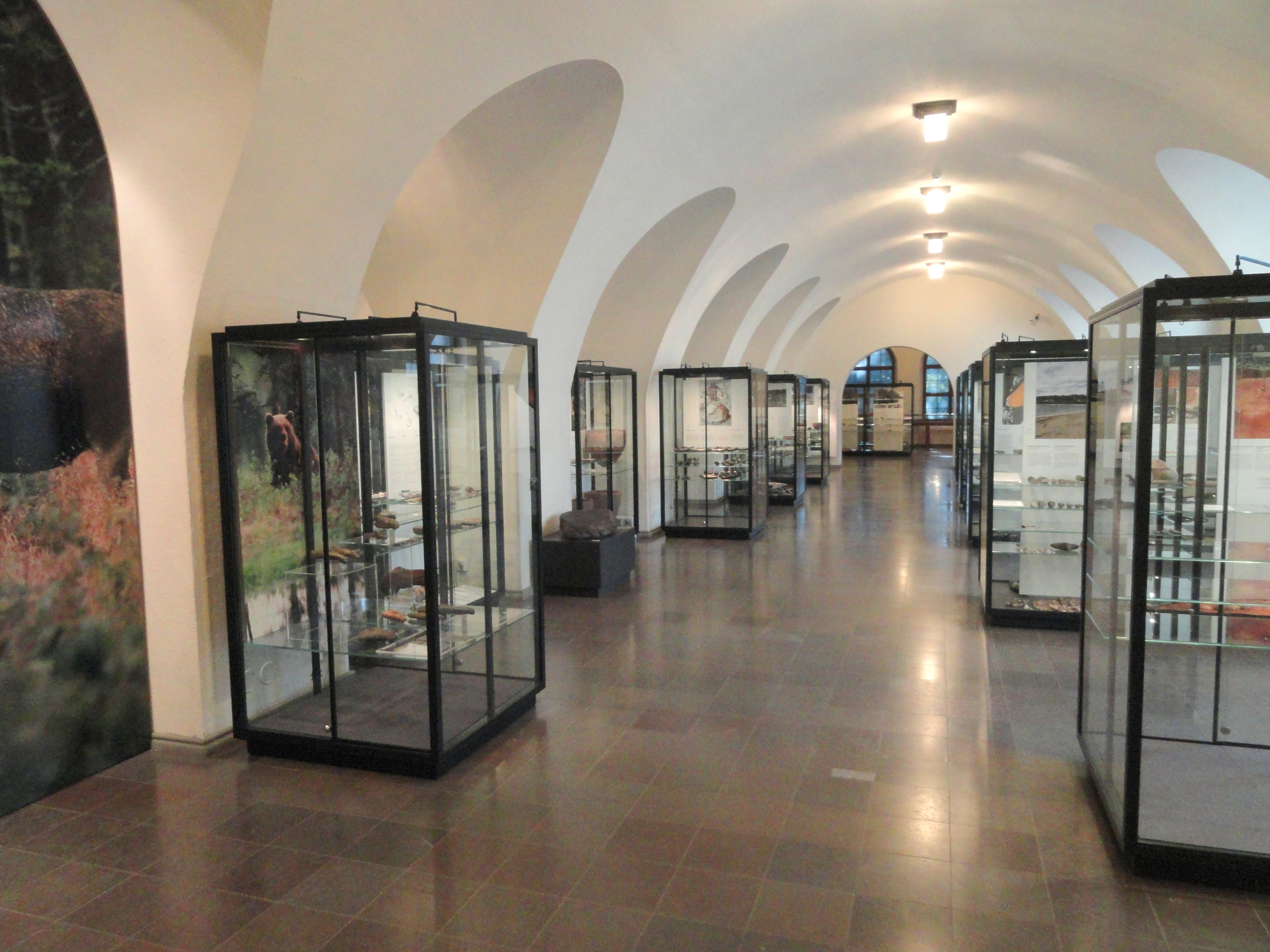
Finnish Stone Age collection

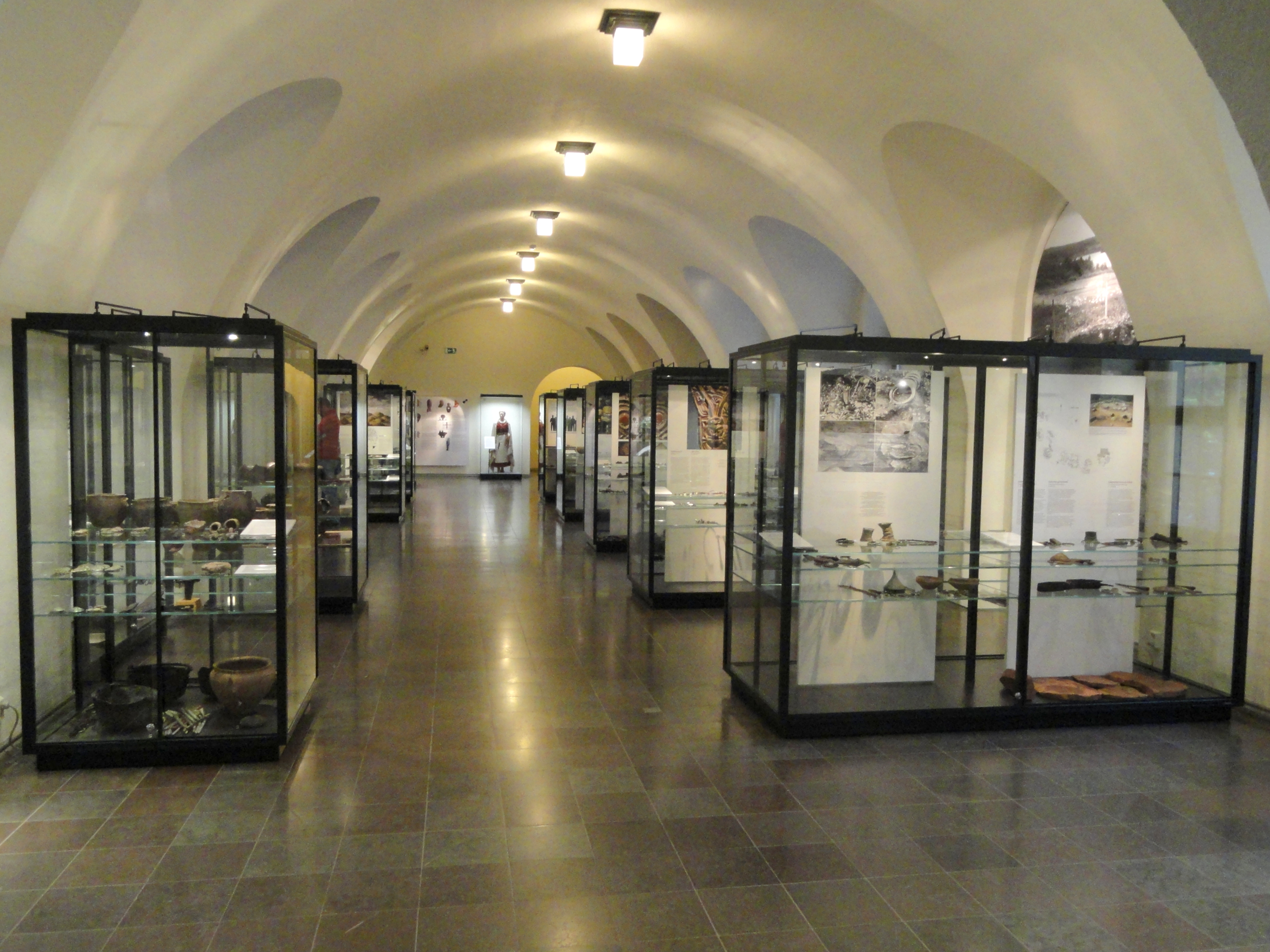
Finnish Bronze or Iron Age collection

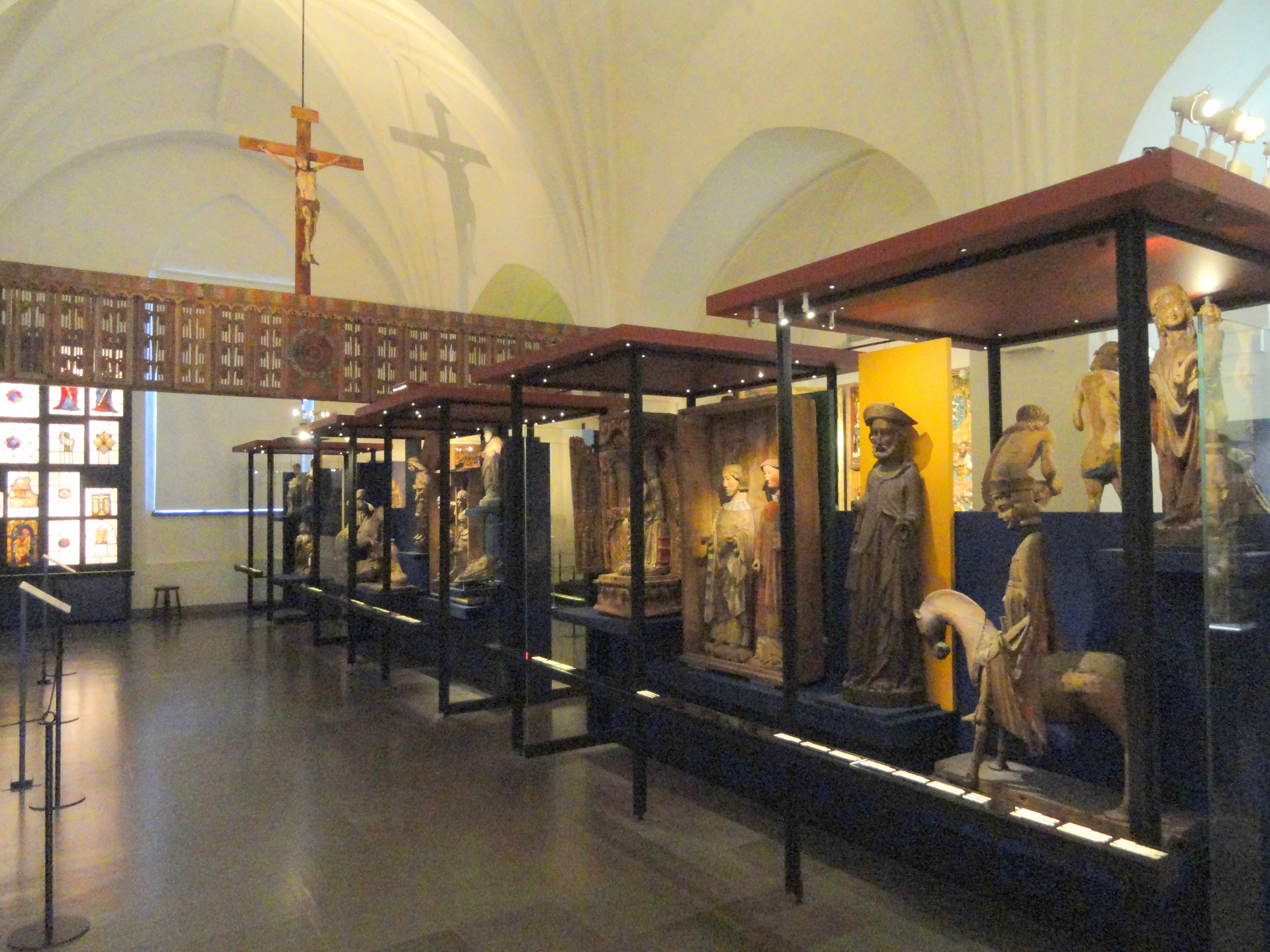
Medieval Finnish Christian art

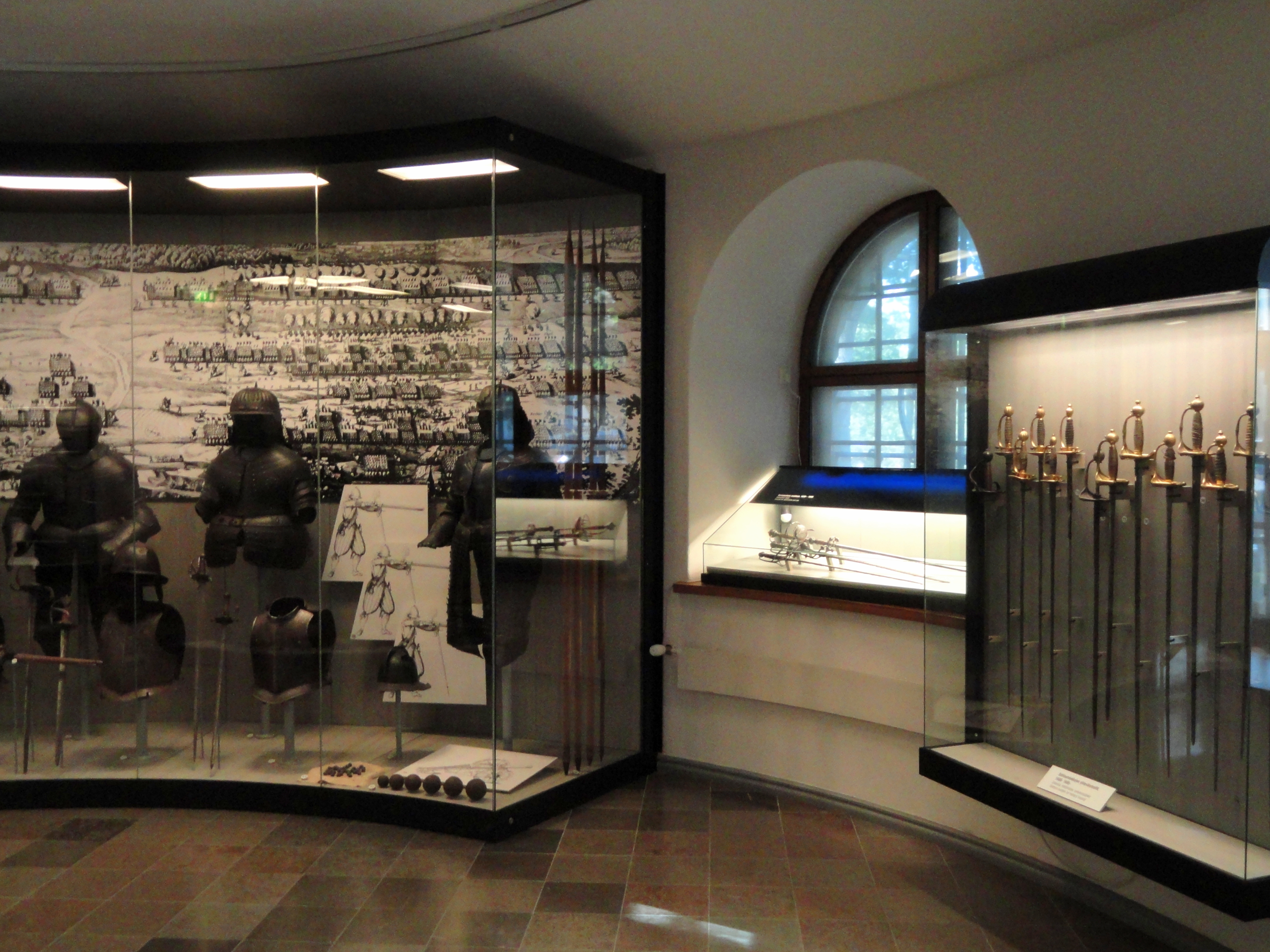
Armor and weapon collection

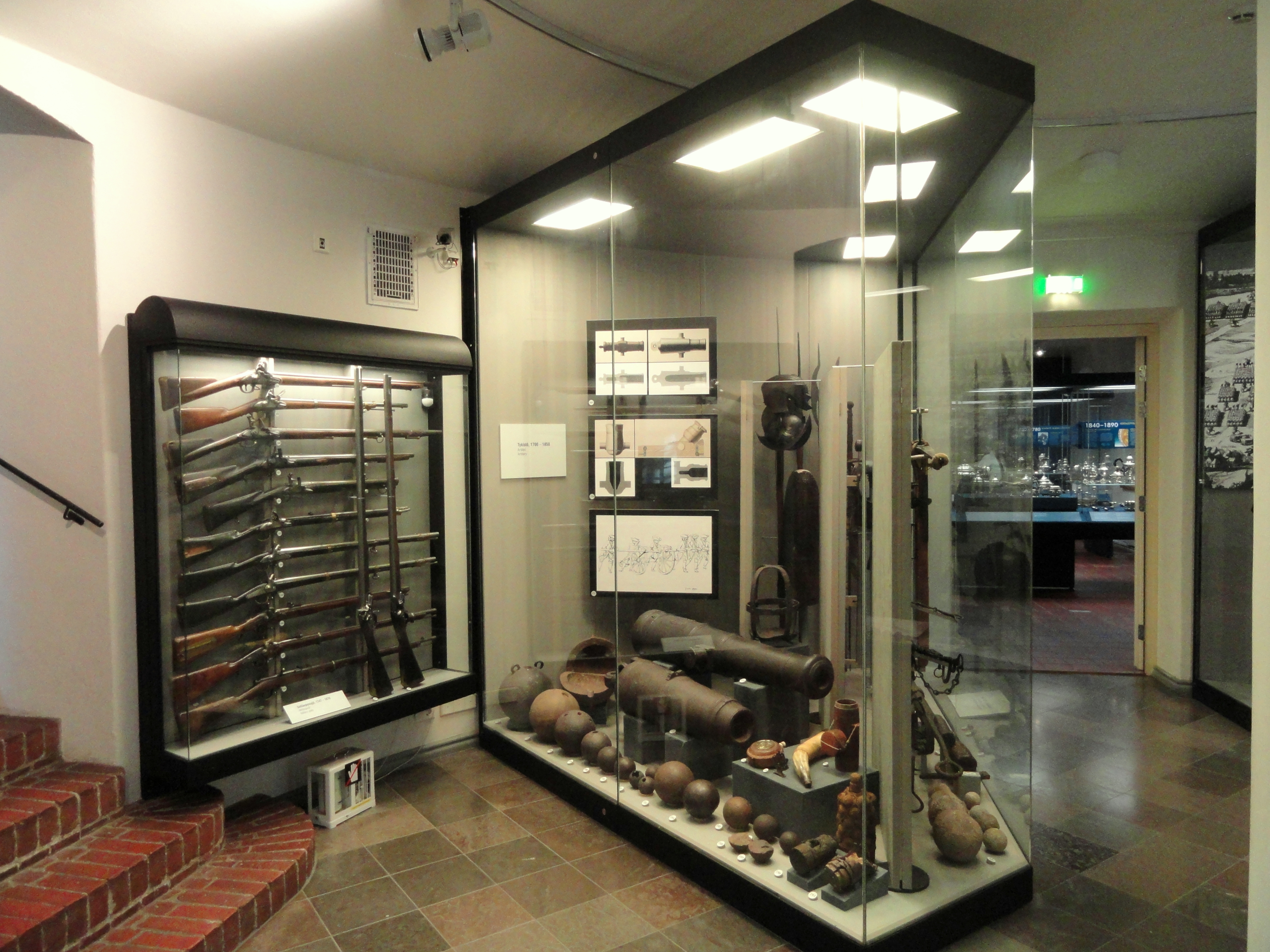
Weapon (and in the back silverware) collection

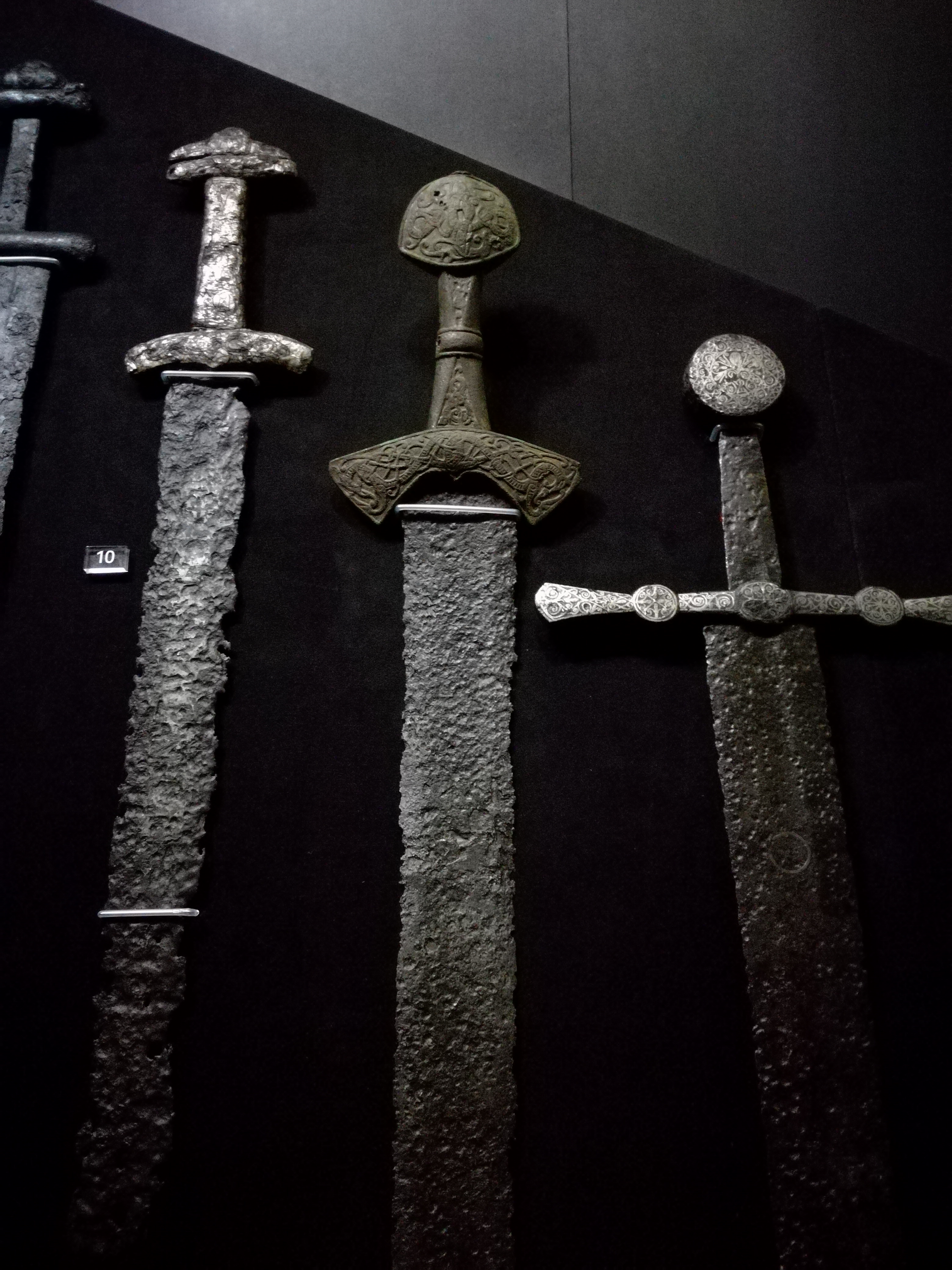
Suontaka sword

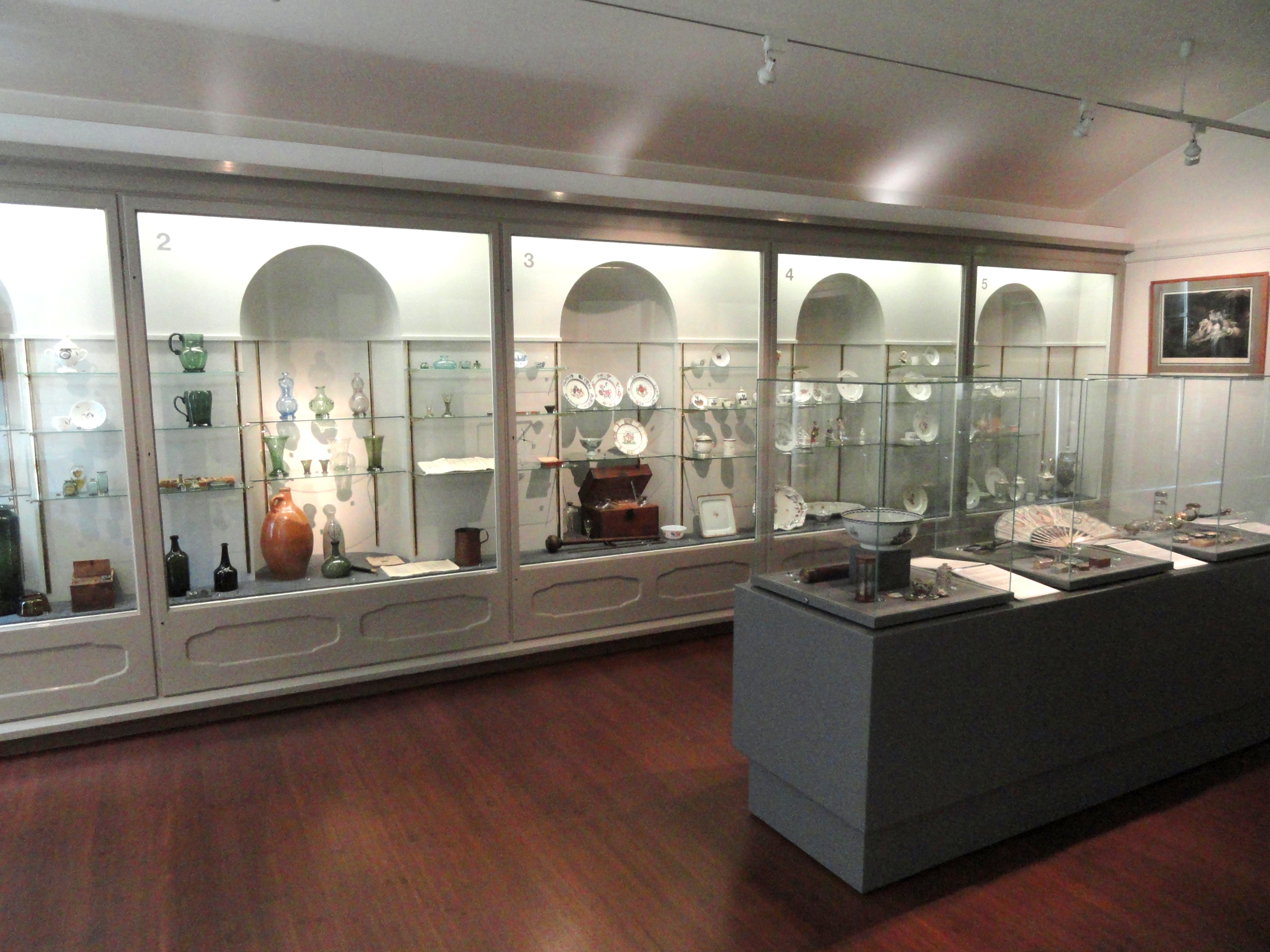
Tableware

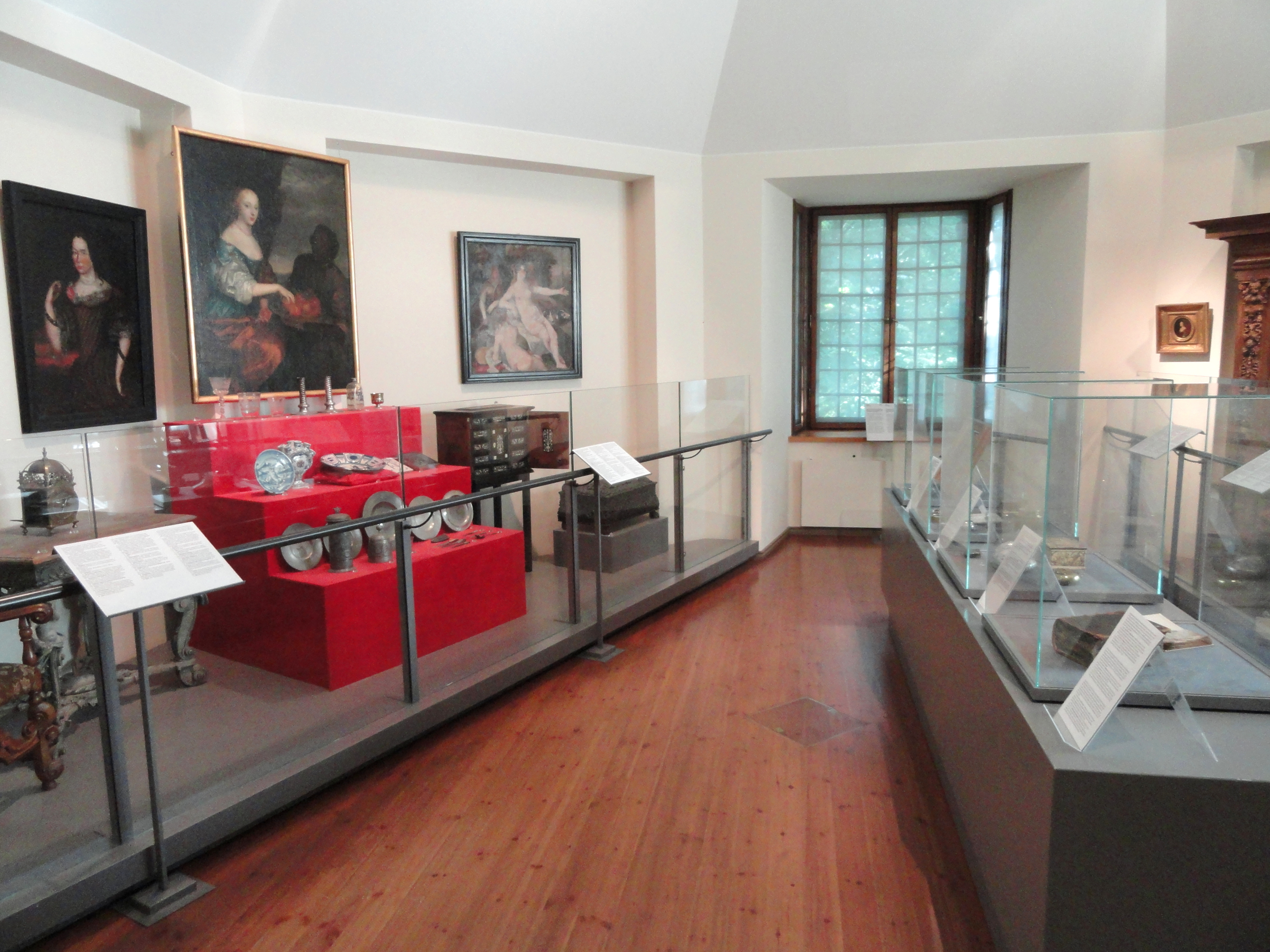
Various objects

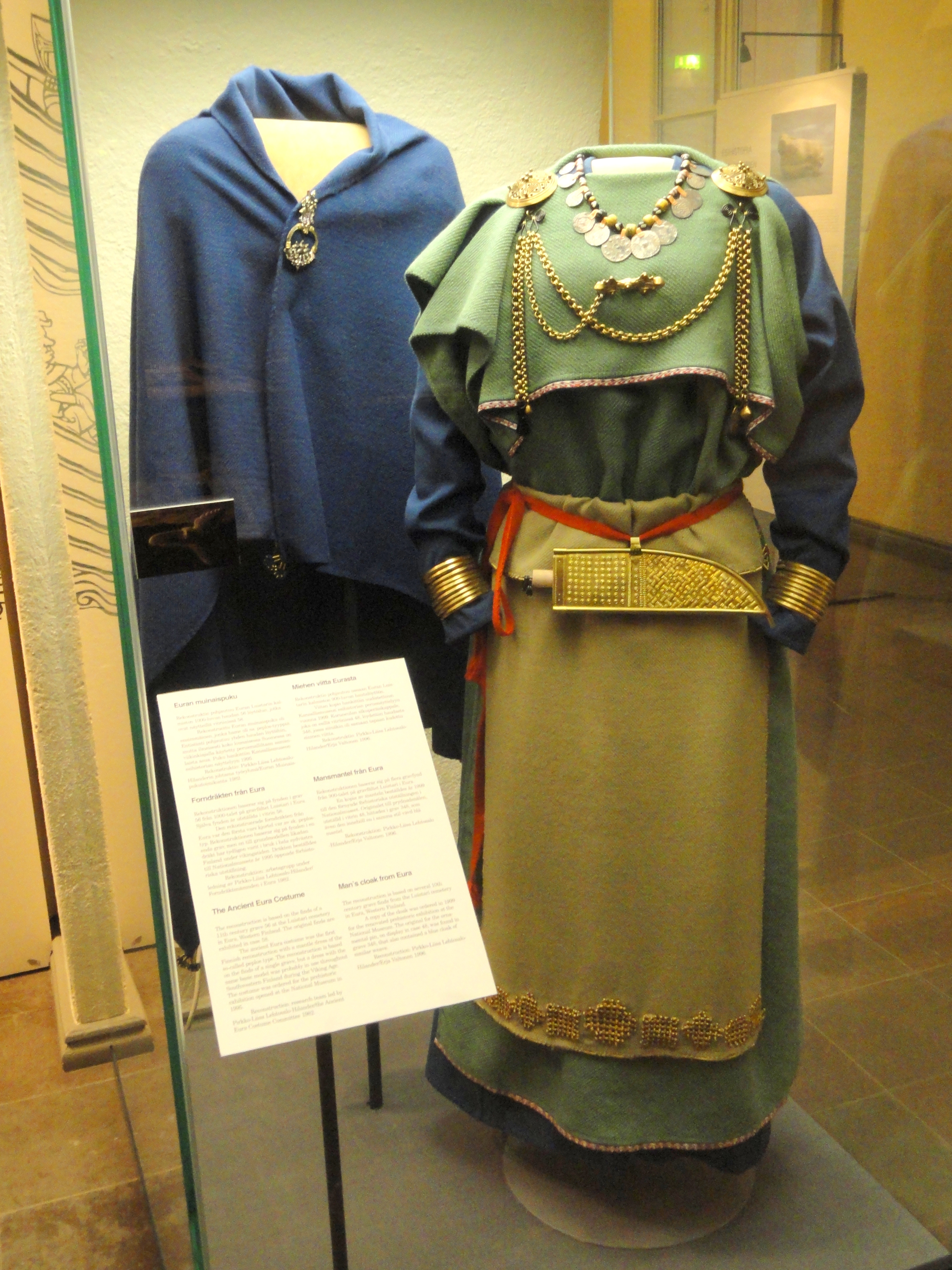
The Eura Dress of the Eura Matron

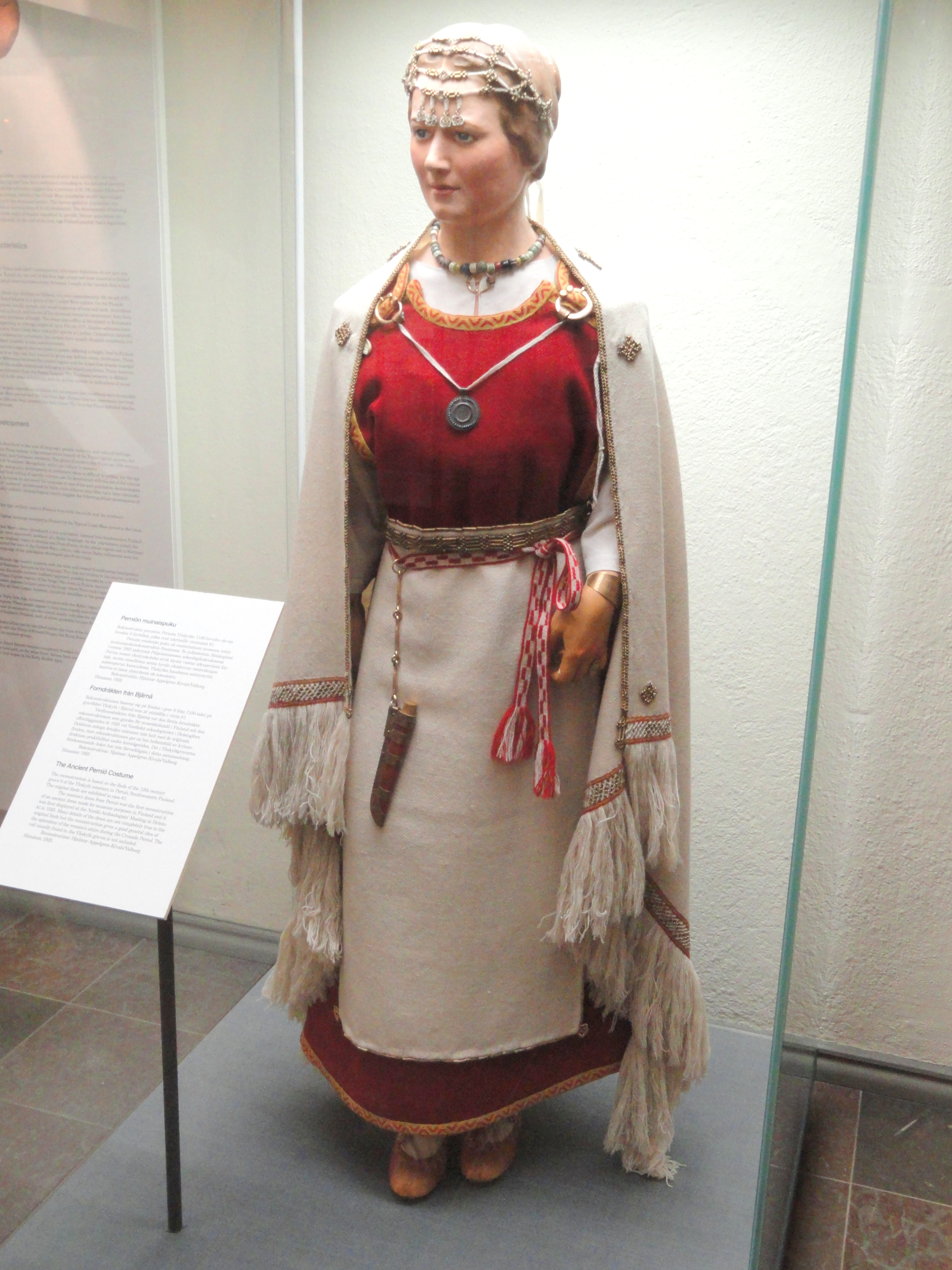
Perniö Dress

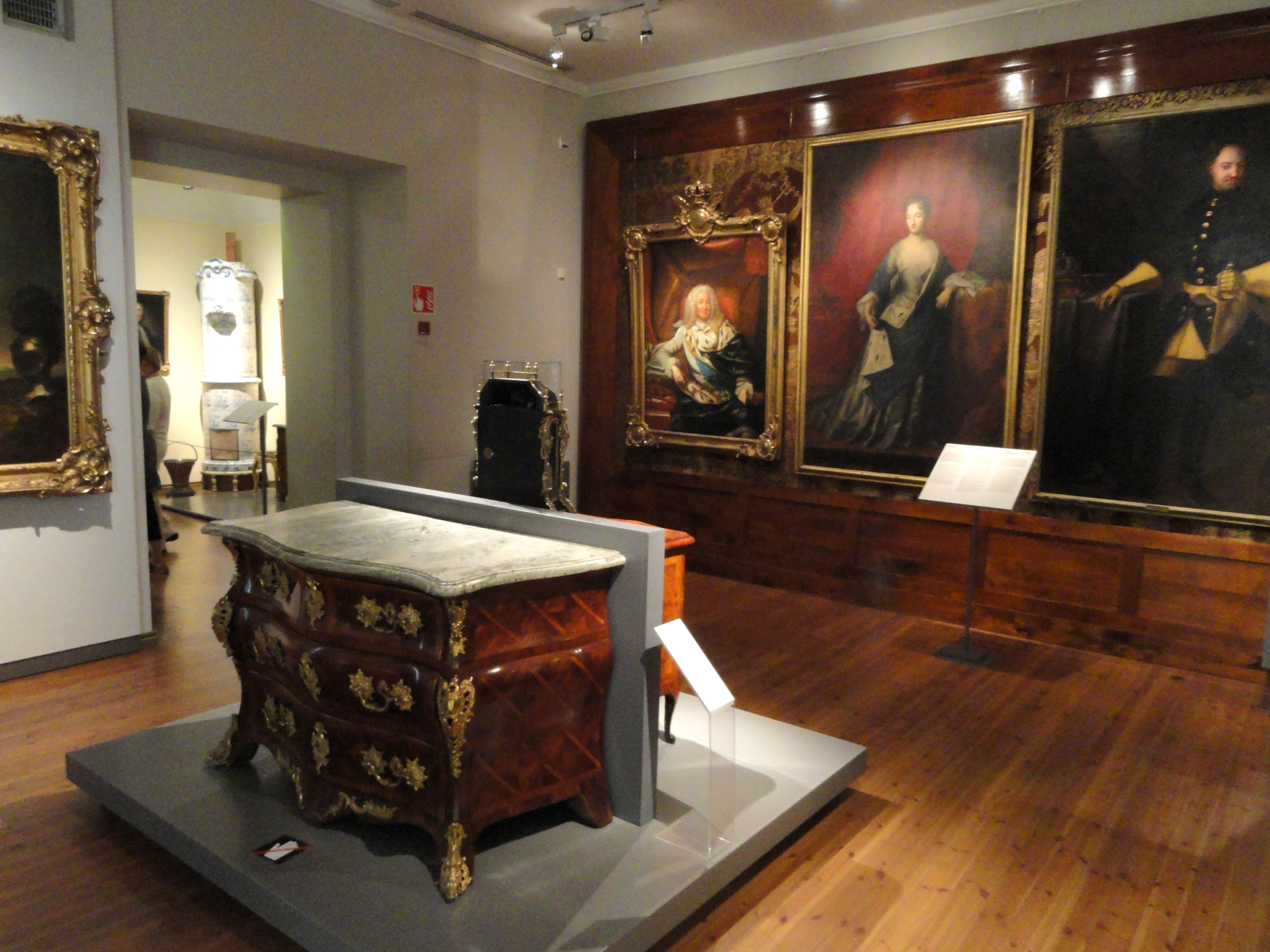
Grand furniture and paintings

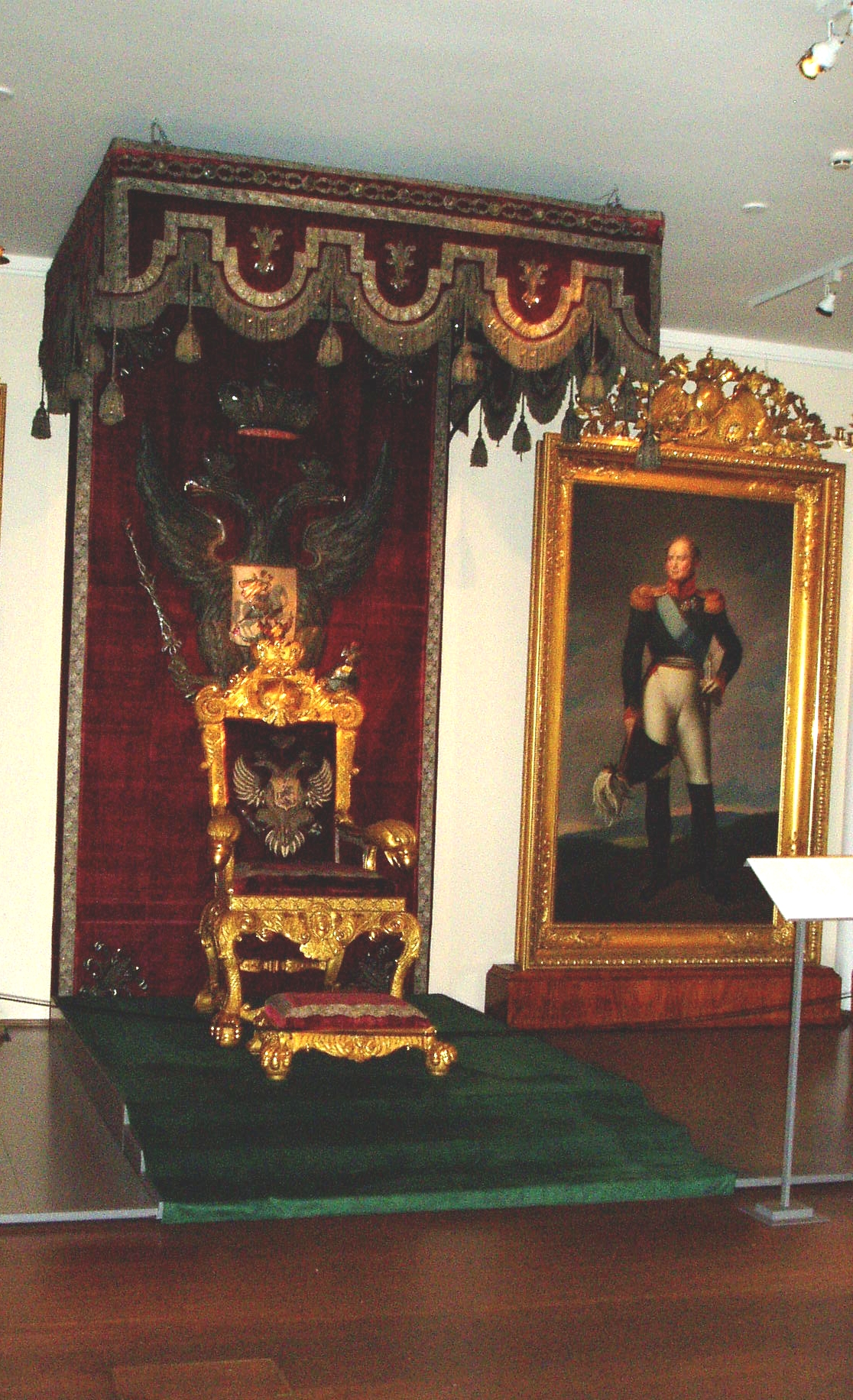
Alexander I's seat used at Diet of Porvoo, originally commissioned by Paul I at St. Petersburg in 1797

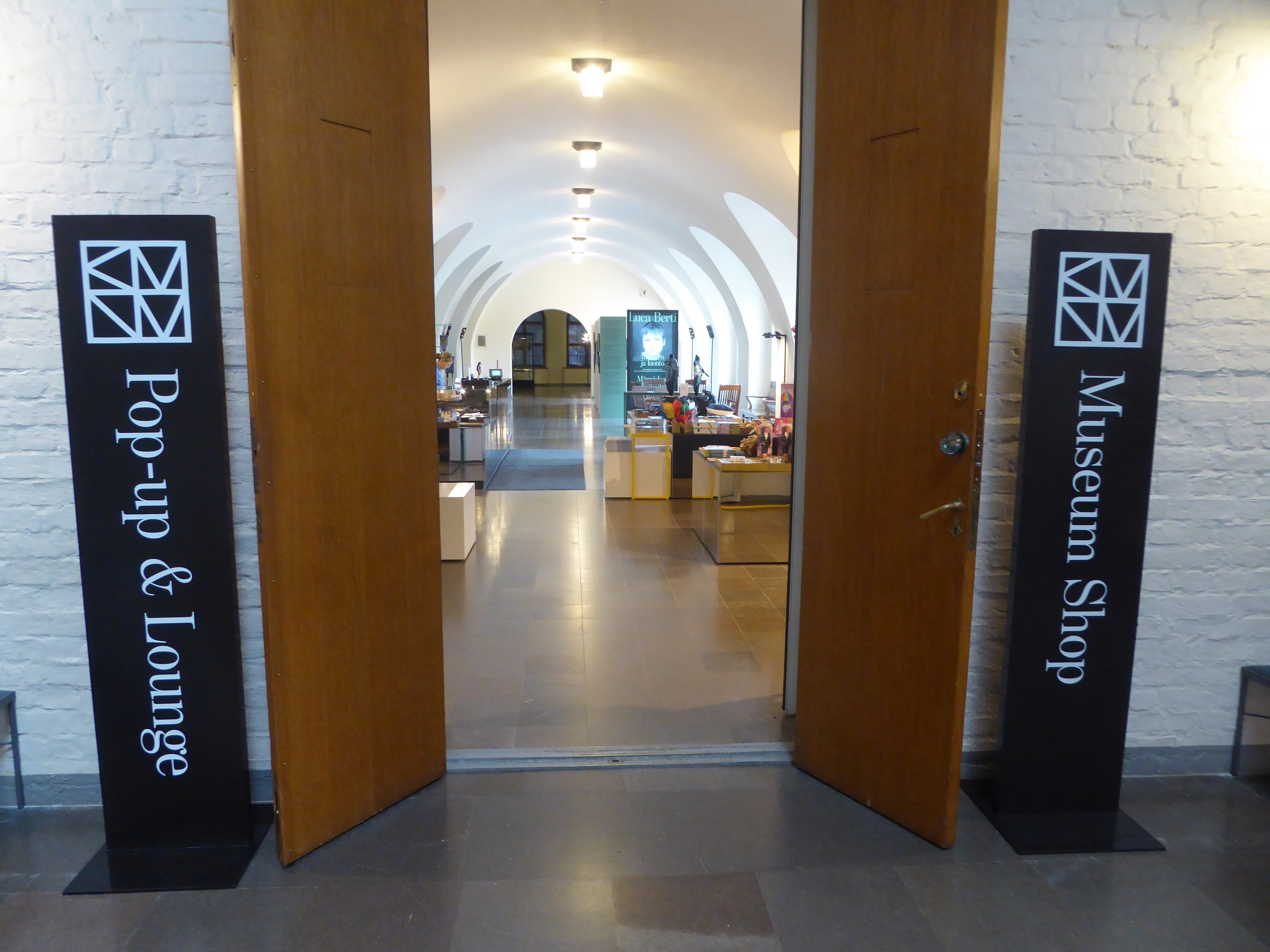
Museum shop and lounge

== See also ==
- Elk's Head of Huittinen, an eight to nine thousand year old sculpture exhibited at the museum.
