= Suontaka sword =

11th-century or 12th-century Finnish sword

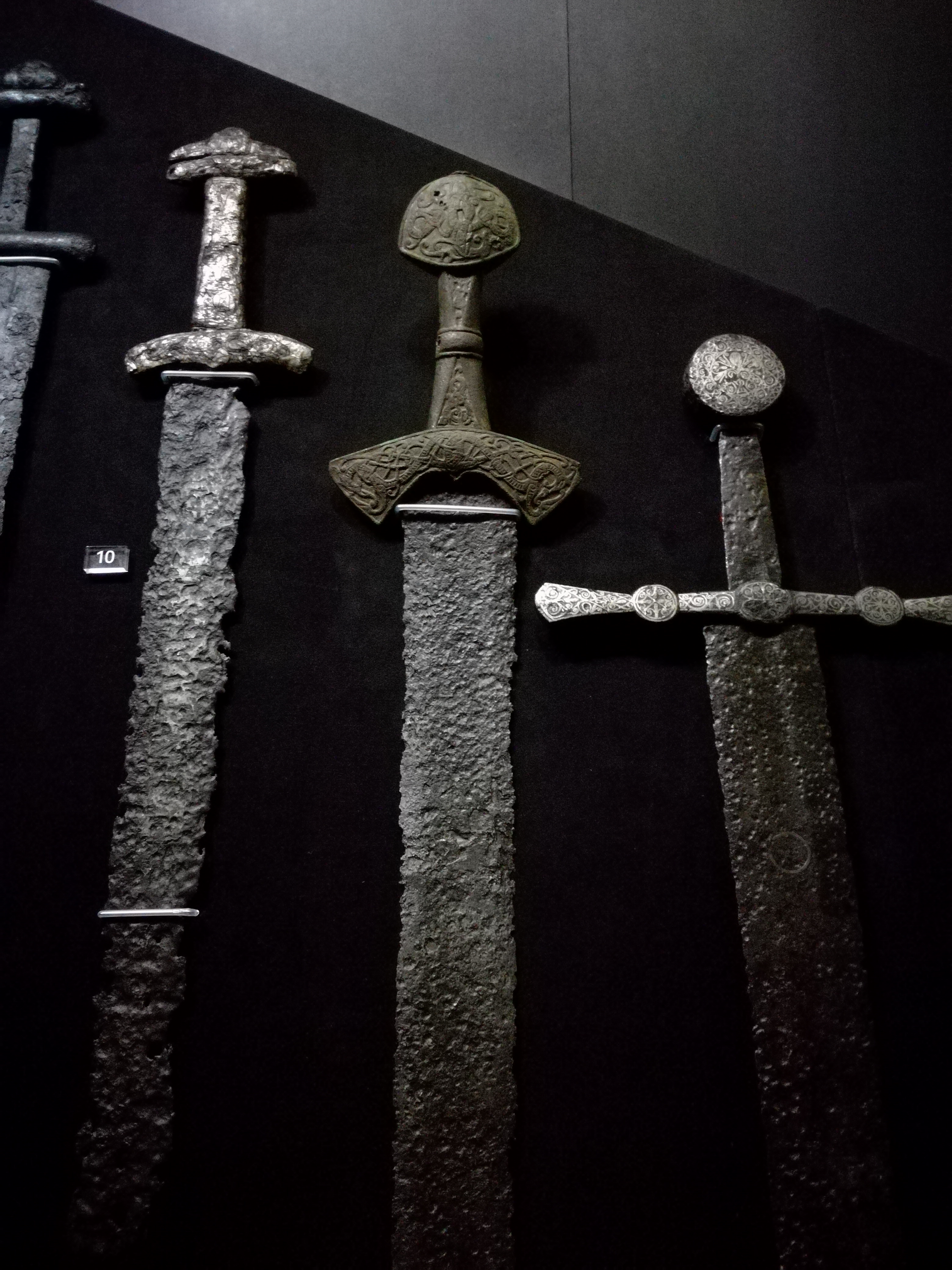
The Suontaka Sword (center) in the National Museum of Finland in 2017

The Suontaka sword (Finnish: Suontaan miekka) was found in what was previously interpreted as a high-status woman's grave at Suontaka Vesitorninmäki, Tyrväntö, Finland in 1968. Based on a study published in 2021, the sword was likely hidden in the grave some time after the burial. The grave dates from the late Nordic Iron Age, c. 1040–1174 AD, and it also included another hiltless sword with silver-inlays that was placed directly on the buried corpse. Ancient DNA analysis found that the individual likely had Klinefelter syndrome, indicated through the presence of XXY chromosomes. The individual had been buried in a female dress with three brooches.

The sword was made with grip and hilt entirely in hollow cast bronze. The sword blade contains texts +NMIN+ and +NIOIN+, which can be abbreviations of In nomine Domini (Latin for "In the name of the Lord") or variations of the text "in the name of god". The sword is considered to be a unique work of art for its time.

Suontaka village is in Häme, Finland. This area of Häme is known for its numerous sword-findings and archaeological sites. The time during which the sword was in use was a prosperous yet violent time in the Häme region. The original sword is in display in the National Museum of Finland. Interpretations have suggested the burial is evidence of gender fluidity in the past.
