= Outline of archaeology =

Overview of and topical guide to archaeology

The following outline is provided as an overview of and topical guide to archaeology:

Archaeology – study of cultures through the recovery, documentation, and analysis of material remains and environmental data, including architecture, artifacts, biofacts, human remains, and landscapes.

== What type of thing is archaeology? ==
Archaeology can be described as all of the following:

- Academic discipline
- Science
  - Social science

=== Essence of archaeology ===
- Archaeological ethics
- Archaeological excavation
- Archaeological record
- Archaeological science
- Archaeological site
- Archaeological theory
- Artifacts
- Biofacts
- Excavation

== Branches of archaeology ==
=== Archaeological practice ===
- Cultural Resources Management
- Archaeological ethics
- Urban archaeology

=== Archaeological science ===
Archaeological science

- Archaeometry
- Dendrochronology
- Isotope analysis
- Palynology
- Radiocarbon dating
- Zooarchaeology
- Geoarchaeology
- Bioarchaeology
- Archaeogenetics
- Computational archaeology

=== Archaeological subdisciplines ===
- Subfields of archaeology
- Ethnoarchaeology
- Taphonomy

==== By location ====
- List of archaeological sites by country
- African archaeology
- Australian archaeology
- European archaeology
- Russian archaeology
- Archaeology of the Americas
- Archaeology of Ayodhya
- Archaeology of the Channel Islands
- Archaeology of China
- Archaeology of Cyprus
- Archaeology of India
- Archaeology of Iowa (United States)
- Archaeology of Israel
- Archaeology of Northern Europe
- Archaeology of the Philippines
- Archaeology of Qatar

==== By time period ====
- Industrial archaeology
- Near Eastern archaeology
- Biblical archaeology
- Medieval archaeology
- Historical archaeology
  - Post-medieval archaeology
  - Industrial archaeology
  - Contemporary archaeology

==== Specialities ====
- Aerial archaeology
- Archaeoastronomy
- Archaeological science
- Archaeozoology
- Archaeobotany or paleoethnobotany
- Battlefield archaeology
- Computational archaeology
- Experimental archaeology
- Environmental archaeology
- Forensic archaeology
- Landscape archaeology
- Maritime archaeology
- Museum studies
- Palaeoarchaeology
- Paleopathology

== History of archaeology ==
History of archaeology

- Table of years in archaeology

== Archaeological methods ==
- Archaeological excavation
- Archaeological field survey
- Archaeological geophysics
- Underwater archaeology

== Archaeological theory ==
Archaeological theory

- Great ages archaeology
- Functionalism
- Processualism / "New Archaeology"
- Post-processualism
- Cognitive archaeology
- Gender archaeology
- Feminist archaeology
- History of archaeology

== Archaeology by Period ==
- List of archaeological periods
- List of archaeological periods (North America)
- Lower Palaeolithic
- Middle Palaeolithic
- Upper Palaeolithic
- Mesolithic
- Neolithic
- Chalcolithic
- Bronze Age
- Iron Age
- Romans
- Anglo-Saxons
- Pre-Columbian
- Medieval
- Industrial

== Archaeological sites ==
Archaeological site

- Feature
- Cairn
- Megalithic tomb
- Pyramid
- Sepulchre
- Tomb
- Votive site

=== Archaeological site features ===
- Burials
- Cuts
  - Re-cuts
- Ditches
- Drains
- Fire pits
- Foundations
- Enclosures
- Graves
- Hearths
- Lynchets
- Middens
- Pit-houses
- Post holes
- Walls

== Archaeological artifacts ==
- Assemblage
- Grave goods
- Hoard
- Manuport
- Sarcophagus
- Small finds
- Stone tool
- Votive deposit

== Other archaeology concepts ==
- Alignment
- Archaeological association
- Archaeological context
- Archaeological culture
- Archaeological field survey
- Archaeological horizon
- Archaeological natural
- Archaeological phase
- Archaeological plan
- Archaeological record
- Archaeological sequence
- Biofact
- Collecting
- Colluvium
- Cropmarks
- Cultural resources management
- Cut
- Dark earth
- Dating methodology
- Dendrochronology
- Deposit model
- Ecofact
- Excavation
- Fill
- Fossil
- Geologic time scale
- Geomatics
- Grave robbing
- Ground-penetrating radar
- Harris matrix
- Law of superposition
- Lithic analysis
- Post excavation
- Projectile point
- Radiocarbon dating
- Relationship
- Seriation
- Stratification

== Influential archaeologists ==
List of archaeologists

== Archaeology lists ==
- List of archaeological periods
- List of archaeologists
- List of Russian historians
- List of designations under the Protection of Wrecks Act
- List of archaeological sites by country
  - List of archaeological sites by continent and age
  - List of Paleolithic sites in China
- List of paleoethnobotanists
- Table of years in archaeology
