= Urban archaeology =

Archaeological sub-discipline

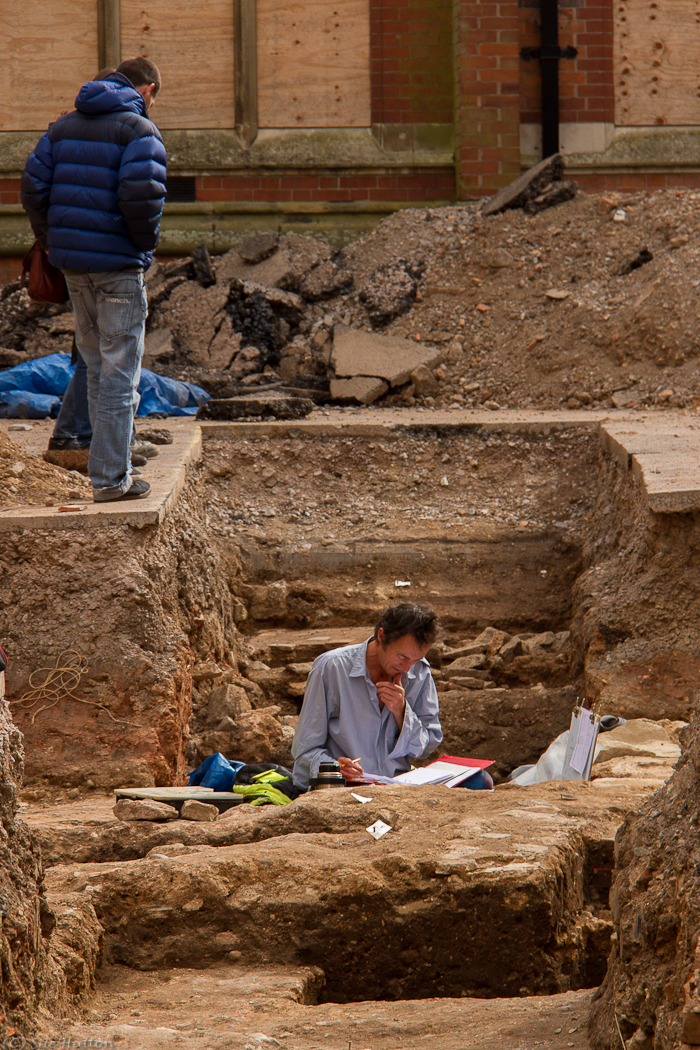
Excavations at a car park in Leicester, United Kingdom, in 2012.

Urban archaeology is a sub discipline of archaeology specializing in the material past of towns and cities where long-term human habitation has often left a rich record of the past. In modern times, when someone talks about living in a city, they are in an area with many surrounding people and buildings, generally quite tall ones. In archaeological terms, cities give great information because of the infrastructure they have and amounts of people that were around one another. Through the years there has been one big method used for urban archaeology along with significant historic developments.

Large concentrations of humans produce large concentrations of waste. Kitchen waste, broken objects, and similar material all need to be disposed of, while small numbers of people can dispose of their waste locally without encouraging vermin or endangering their health. Once people began to live together in large numbers, around five thousand years ago, such methods began to become impractical and material usually was brought into these new settlements but would rarely be taken out again.

Urban archaeology can be applied to the study of social, racial, and economic dynamics and history within contemporary and antiquated cities as well as the environmental impacts within these spaces.

Up until the nineteenth century when organized rubbish disposal became widespread in urban areas people invariably threw their waste from their windows or buried it in their gardens. If their houses fell down, a common enough occurrence when planning laws were non-existent, owners would pick out what they could reuse, stamp down the remains and rebuild on the old site. Archaeological excavations of urban sites are often categorized by these remains and as well as the former impacts of modern technology such as sanitation, commercial, or transportation services

The effect of this is that even a moderately sized settlement of any antiquity is built on top of a heap of refuse and demolished buildings and is therefore raised up from its original height on a plateau of archaeology. This is most apparent in the tel sites of the Near East where towns that have been occupied for thousands of years are raised up many metres above the surrounding landscape.

In walled towns, such as those in medieval Europe, the effect of the encircling defenses was to hold in the waste so that it could not slip outwards, magnifying the effect.

Redevelopment and archaeological excavation is a part of modern urban life and public interest in urban archaeological work is often strong, yet developers can be cautious of unbridled dissemination of information that has the potential to ignite public opinion. Urban archaeology carries the opportunity for archaeologists to work with the public to illustrate the history and heritage of discoveries.

Urban archaeology and its management can help in the design of urban spaces that are more inclusive, sustainable and meaningful for future generations. It can inform our understanding of historical transitions, spatial networks and interactions between people and their urban environments

== Historic development ==
Archaeological excavation within historic cities therefore often produces a thick stratigraphy dating back to the original foundation and telling the story of its history.

The City of London serves as an example, for urban excavations have been performed there since the late 1900s. These excavations, performed in populated areas of the city, revealed historical evidence of events unforeseen previously by historians. London sits on a tel, which preserves a layer of dark material, attributed to the burning of the city by Boudica in 60 AD. It was only by excavation of the urban areas that these revelations could be made, as the city has long since outgrown its borders after its rebuild, some years after the Boudican revolt.

Another good example is the City of Turku, founded in the Middle Ages in southwestern Finland, for which no reliable document has been preserved since its foundation; countless excavations have been carried out in the city each year in order to gain more clarity on the city’s birth history.

The dense stratigraphy of such cities posed problems for the archaeologists who first excavated them. Earlier excavations were generally limited to rural areas, or towns which had been long abandoned. Open area excavation was feasible as there was plenty of space and the archaeology could often be exposed just in plan. In working cities however, space for excavation is usually limited to the size of the open plot and one layer of archaeology needs to be excavated before the next one can be exposed.

Additionally, Rome was also a big archaeological site since it was considered well established and advanced over time. Many excavations have been done there and later studied by archaeologists. One archaeologist who spent great time studying Roman archaeology was W. F. Grimes.

Issues such as this had appeared before, at Pompeii or at multi-phase rural sites but the move towards the investigation of cities, which began in Europe following the Second World War. The trend of urban excavation in areas such as Europe, the East Coast of the United States, and other western world cities, has grown since the war. Due to the bombing of landscapes during the war, the possibility of losing evidence connected to early civilizations became realized. The idea of settlement follows a principle, that settlement is made where resources are conveniently accessed. Prosperous cities, such as Boston and London, began as settlements, and grew quickly due to the convenient access of resources. However, the fact that these cities still exist today does not dismiss the fact that, at some point in history, some other civilization had once settled there.

== Methods ==
The resulting solution revolved around the method of single context recording. This method was started by Ed Harris and Patrick Ottaway in 1976 before being expanded upon by the Museum of London in the mid 1980s and transferred to the York Archaeological Trust. The practice involves drawing each feature individually in plan and then relating its position to the site grid rather than planning large areas at once. Each drawing is made on a square piece of translucent film representing a 5-metre x 5-metre grid square. The site is excavated down to the first significant layer of archaeology and features excavated and recorded as normal but also planned as single contexts. The site is then reduced to the next layer of archaeology and the process begins again. The excavation and recording can continue until natural deposits are reached. A small, deep trench known as a sondage is often excavated at first to provide a view of the entire stratigraphy at once and give an indication of the quantity of material to be excavated. Simply put, if someone does one plan per context than the method that are using is single context recording.

Once the work is finished, the square sheets can be overlaid onto one another to provide a picture of the site. By identifying which features cut others and using information from dateable artefacts and ecofacts an archaeologist can isolate various phases of activity and show how the use of the site developed of periods of hundreds or even thousands of years. Context record sheets produced by the individual excavators provide further information on each context's nature and relationship with its neighbours. Such interpretation would be impossible using open area excavation where numerous overall site plans would soon seem inflexible.

== Notable urban archaeologists ==
- W. F. Grimes: Archaeologist who spent extensive time studying London and Roman archaeology, specifically dating back to medieval times. He also wrote a book, which described his findings about London and Rome.
- Martin Biddle: He is a British archaeologist and professor who was the first lecturer in medieval archaeology in England. He is chairman of the Fabric Advisory Committee for Winchester Cathedral, Archaeological Consultant for St Albans Cathedral, and former Archaeological Consultant for Canterbury Cathedral.
- Martin Carver: He was a professor from the department of Archaeology at the University of York. Carver was active in pursuing new excavation methods and survey methods while studying early medieval Europe archaeology.
- Michael E. Smith: Smith is an archaeologist who had two primary focuses with his studies: Aztecs, Teotihuacan and ancient central Mexico societies along with comparative urbanism. He has also been the director of several fieldwork projects at different sites in the provinces of the Aztec empire in central Mexico.

== See also ==
- Archaeological field survey
- Archaeological context
- Archaeological plan
- Single context recording
- Harris matrix
- Archaeological excavation
