= Single context recording =

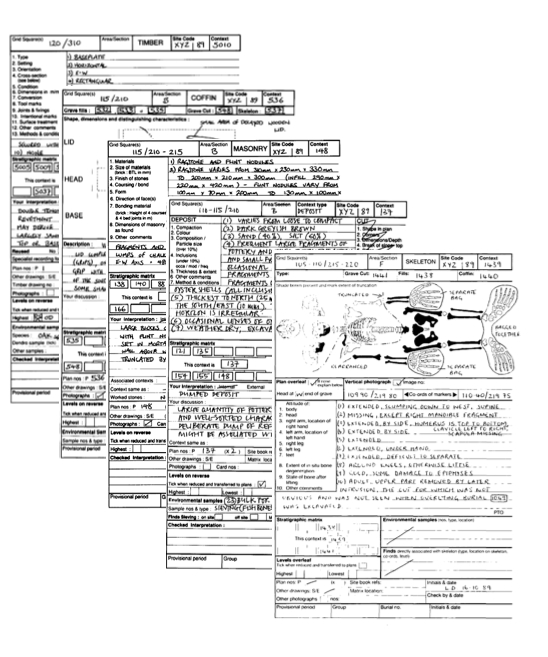
Typical context sheets

Single context recording was initially developed by Ed Harris and Patrick Ottaway in 1976, from a suggestion by Laurence Keen. It was further developed by the Department of Urban Archaeology (Museum of London) from where it was then exported, in the mid-1980s by Pete Clarke to the Scottish Urban Archaeological Trust and Nick Pearson to the York Archaeological Trust. It has become a popular system of recording and planning being used in many countries in Europe and in Lebanon, it is especially suited to the complexities of deep, typically urban, archaeology. Each excavated context is given a unique "context number" and is recorded by type on a context sheet and perhaps being drawn on a plan and/or a section. Depending on time constraints and importance contexts may also be photographed, but in this case a grouping of contexts and their associations are the purpose of the photography. Finds from each context are bagged and labelled with their context number and site code for later cross-reference work carried out post excavation. The height above sea level of pertinent points on a context, such as the top and bottom of a wall are taken and added to plans sections and context sheets. Heights are recorded with a dumpy level or total station by relation to the site temporary benchmark (abbr. T.B.M). Samples of deposits from contexts are sometimes also taken, for later environmental analysis or for scientific dating.

== In practice ==
Contexts being excavated are recorded on context sheets which vary in style depending on practitioner but in general share characteristics. Most will have sections for composition of soils or profiles for cuts. it is common practice to have special sheets available to record contexts denoted by; masonry, timber and skeletons listing the many variables that are of interest to the archaeologists both onsite and post excavation. A plan is also made that conforms to grid squares (usually setup as a 5m grid).

=== Revealing the sequence ===
Single context recording of a stratigraphically excavated sequence evolves into an overlay of planned contexts that build a Harris matrix during excavation. (see Stratification (archeology) and Harris matrix) This is demonstrated in the gallery below of a hypothetical and abstract 5 step sequence of contexts. The excavation starts with the planning and removal of a deposit in step 1 and continues down through a sequence of 4 cut features. Note how only the stratigraphic relationships build into the matrix as the excavation progresses rather than all the physical relationships. (For planning convention styles see archaeological plan)

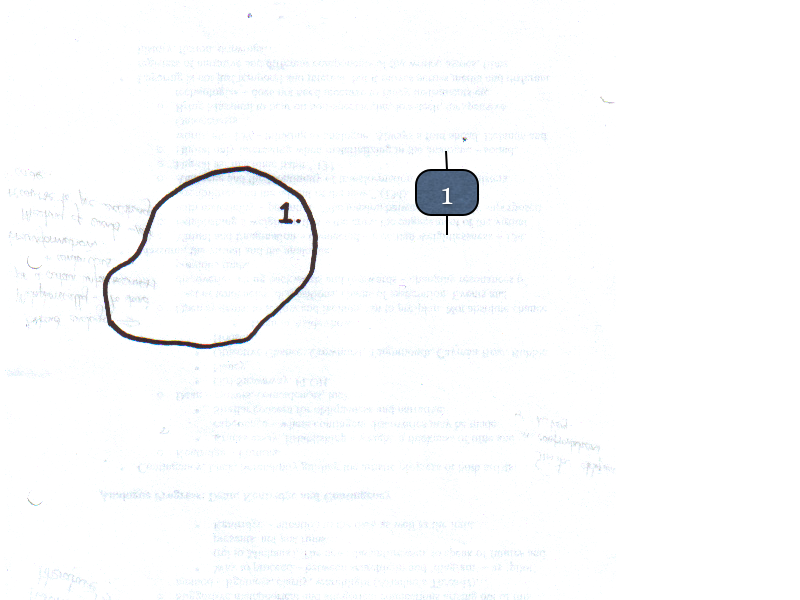
Step 1

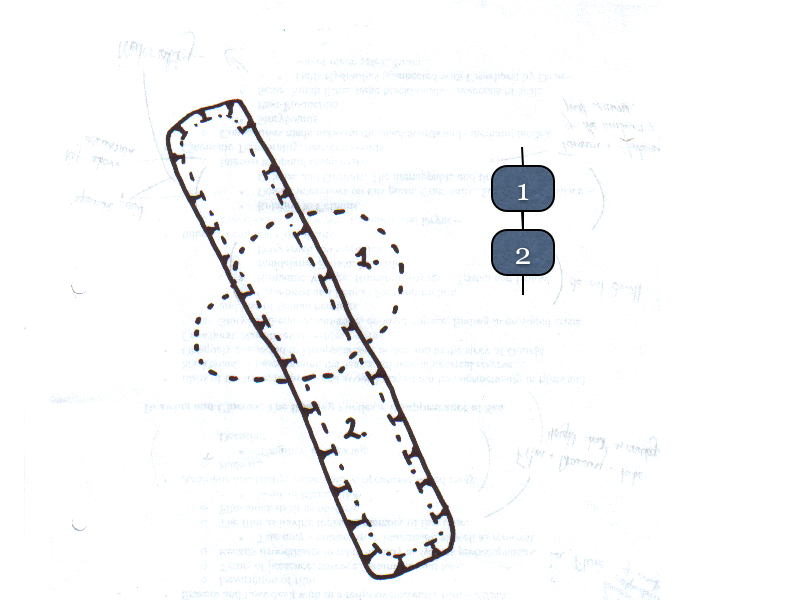
Step 2

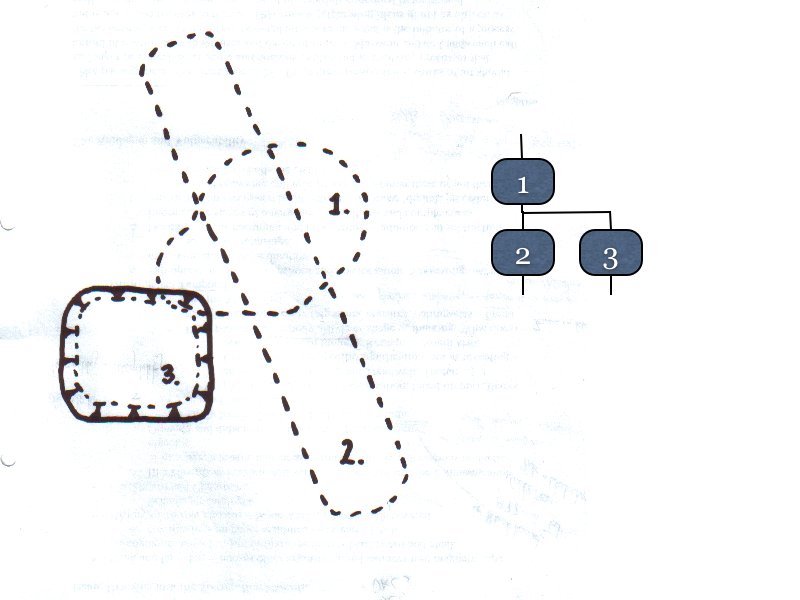
Step 3

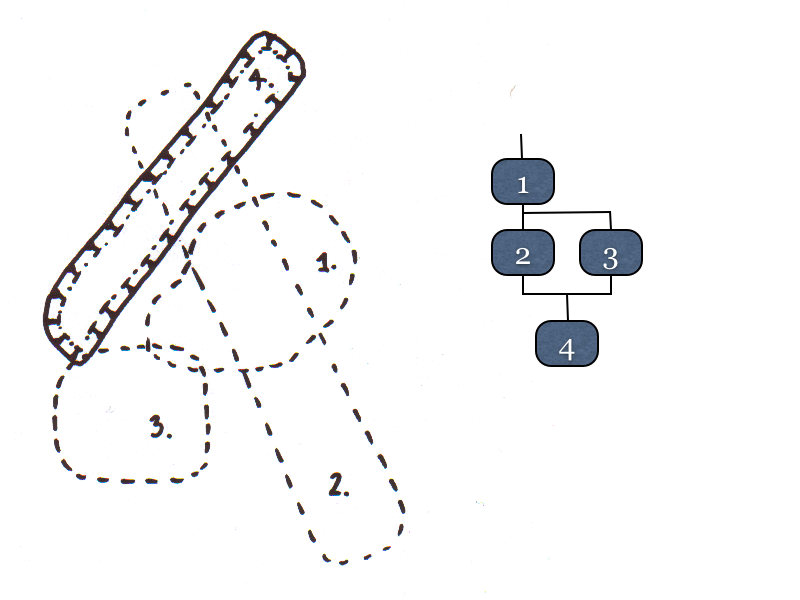
Step 4

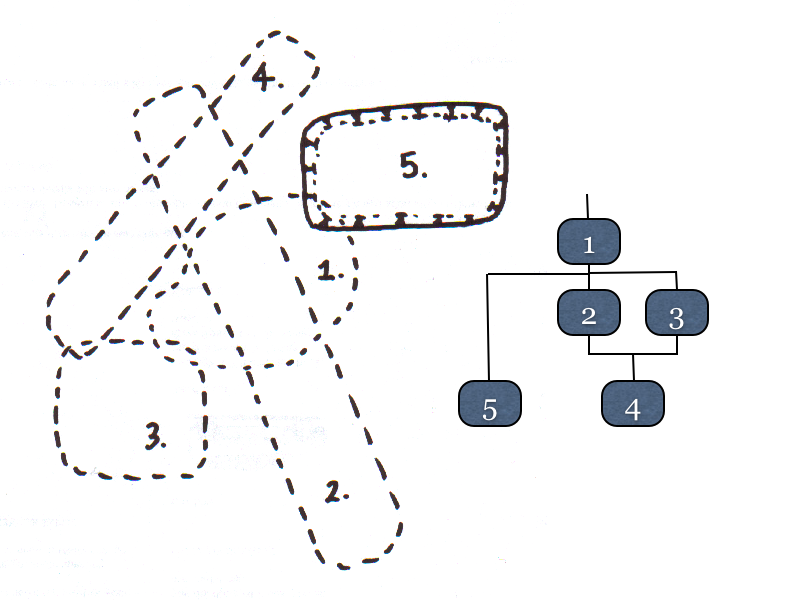
Step 5

In reality the process is more complex and involves many more contexts for the series of features shown in the diagram. This is because the contexts representing the fills have been omitted for simplicity and the matrix shown is more akin to a Carver matrix (Not to be confused with the military term also named CARVER matrix).

== Critics ==
Critics of single context recording point out that it encourages a lazy attitude towards attempts to phase the site while excavation is in progress, and that it diminishes the incentive for archaeologists to interpret what they are digging beyond the boundaries of the context being excavated rather than trying to understand it using the entire area of the site for insight. It is argued that this lack of interpretation leads to a thoughtless use of the law of superposition, creating chronological anomalies from features and contexts of a tunnelling nature such as drain backfills, buried waterfront tiebacks or natural processes. Counter-critics argue that, while this is a possibility, no archaeologist needs to be transfixed by the applied recording system if faced with a stratigraphic conundrum, and that deviation from a pure single context recording regime is not a sin. Furthermore, single context recording is not an excuse for not attempting to view the site as a whole during excavation.

== See also ==
- Archaeological association
- Archaeological context
- Archaeological plan
- Archaeological section
- Cut (archaeology)
- Excavation
- Feature (archaeology)
- Relationship (archaeology)
