= Archaeological excavation =

Exposure, processing and recording of archaeological remains

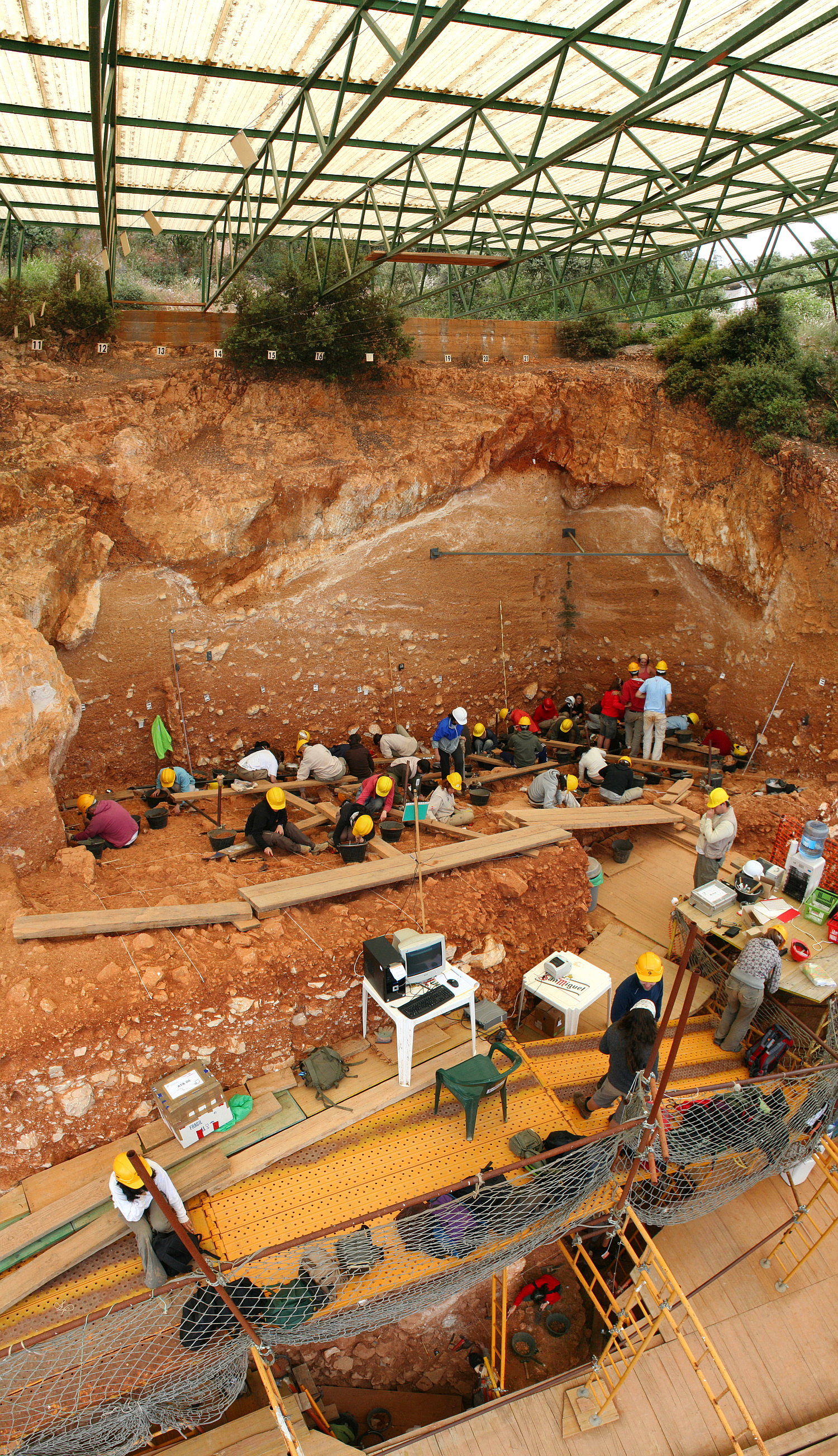
Excavations at the site of Gran Dolina, in the Atapuerca Mountains, Spain, 2008

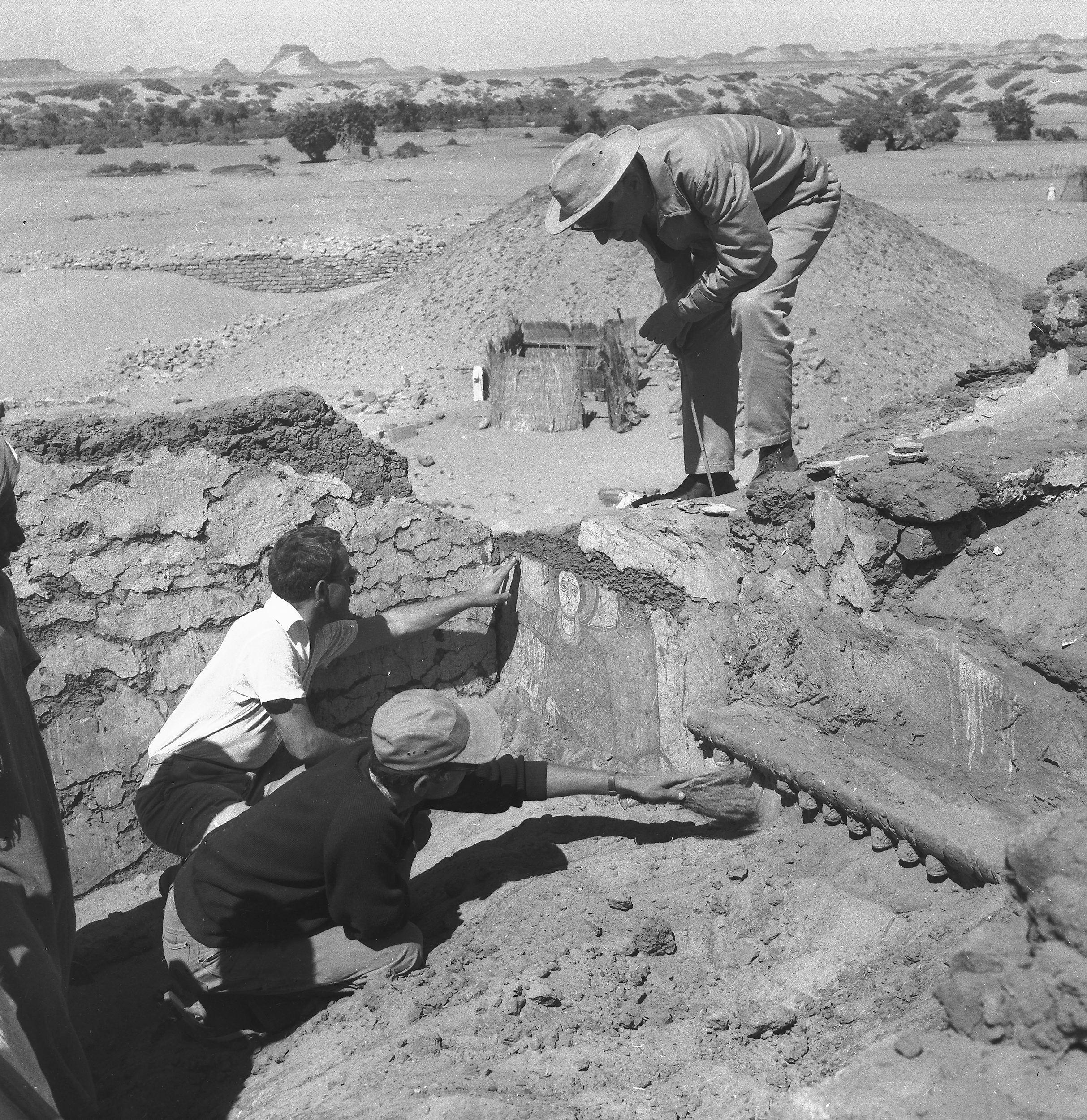
Excavations at Faras, Sudan, 1960s

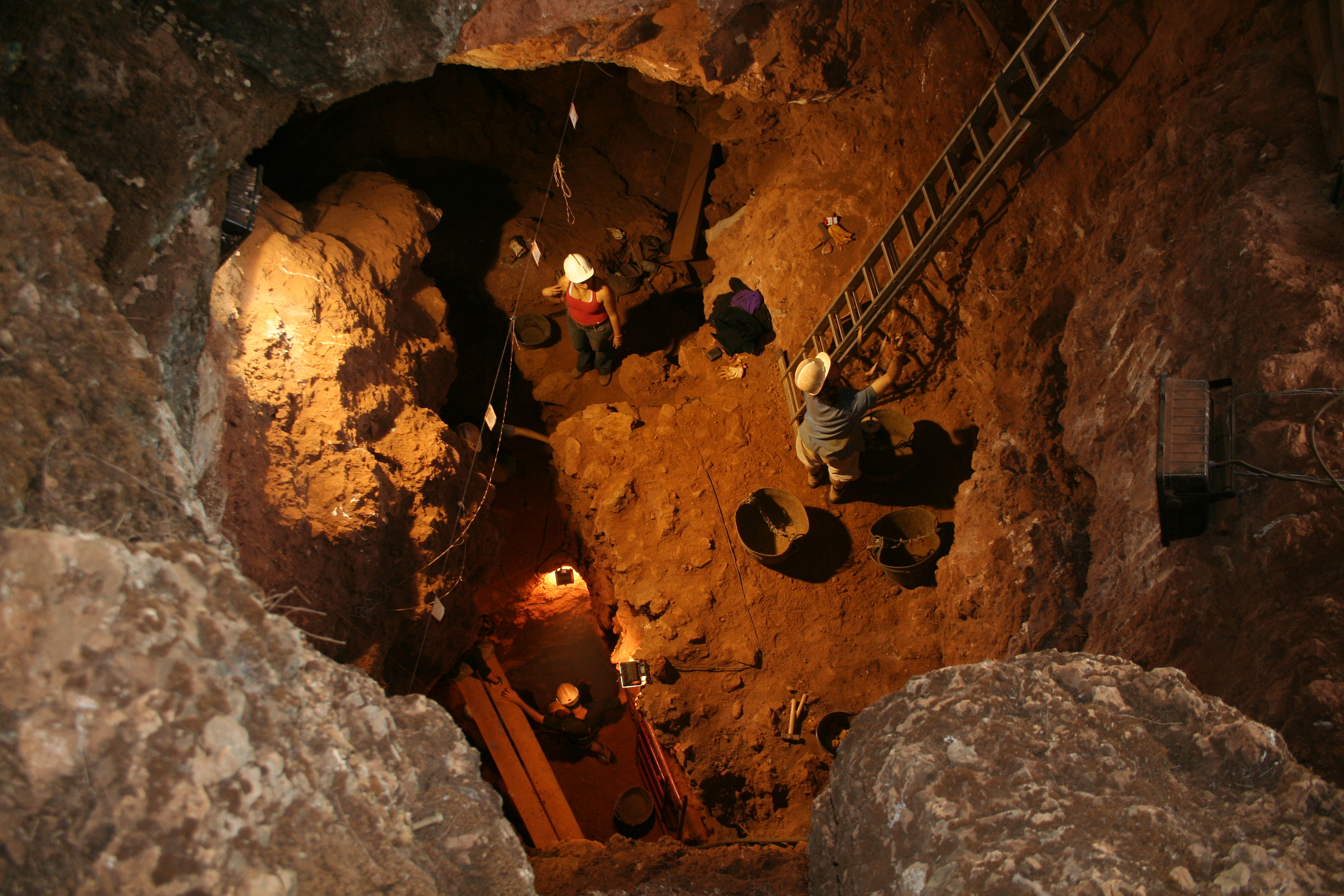
Excavations at the cave of Santa Ana (Cáceres, Extremadura, Spain)

In archaeology, excavation is the exposure, processing, and recording of archaeological remains. An excavation site or "dig" is the area being studied. These locations range from one to several areas at a time during a project and can be conducted over a few weeks to several years.

Excavation involves the recovery of several types of data from a site. This data includes artifacts (portable objects made or modified by humans), features (non-portable modifications to the site itself such as post molds, burials, and hearths), ecofacts (evidence of human activity through organic remains such as animal bones, pollen, or charcoal), and archaeological context (relationships among the other types of data).

Before excavating, the presence or absence of archaeological remains can often be suggested by, non-intrusive remote sensing, such as ground-penetrating radar. Basic information about the development of the site may be drawn from this work, but to understand finer details of a site, excavation via augering can be used.

During excavation, archaeologists often use stratigraphic excavation to remove phases of the site one layer at a time. This keeps the timeline of the material remains consistent with one another. This is done usually though mechanical means where artifacts can be spot dated and the soil processed through methods such as mechanical sieving or water flotation. Afterwards, digital methods are then used record the excavation process and its results. Ideally, data from the excavation should suffice to reconstruct the site completely in three-dimensional space.

== History ==
One of the first known instances of archaeological excavation took place in the sixth century BC when Nabonidus, the king of Babylon, excavated a temple floor that was thousands of years old. During early Roman periods, Julius Caesar's men looted bronze artifacts, and by the medieval period, Europeans had begun digging up pots that had partially emerged from erosion, and weapons that had turned up on farmlands. Antiquarians excavated burial mounds in North America and North-West Europe, which sometimes involved destroying artifacts and their context, losing information about subjects from the past. Meticulous and methodical archaeological excavation took over from antiquarian barrow-digging around the early to mid-nineteenth century and is still being perfected today.

The most dramatic change that occurred over time is the amount of recording and care taken to ensure preservation of artifacts and features. In the past, archaeological excavation involved random digging to unearth artifacts. Exact locations of artifacts were not recorded, and measurements were not taken. Modern archaeological excavation has evolved to include removal of thin layers of sediment sequentially and recording of measurements about artifacts' locations in a site.

== Motivation ==
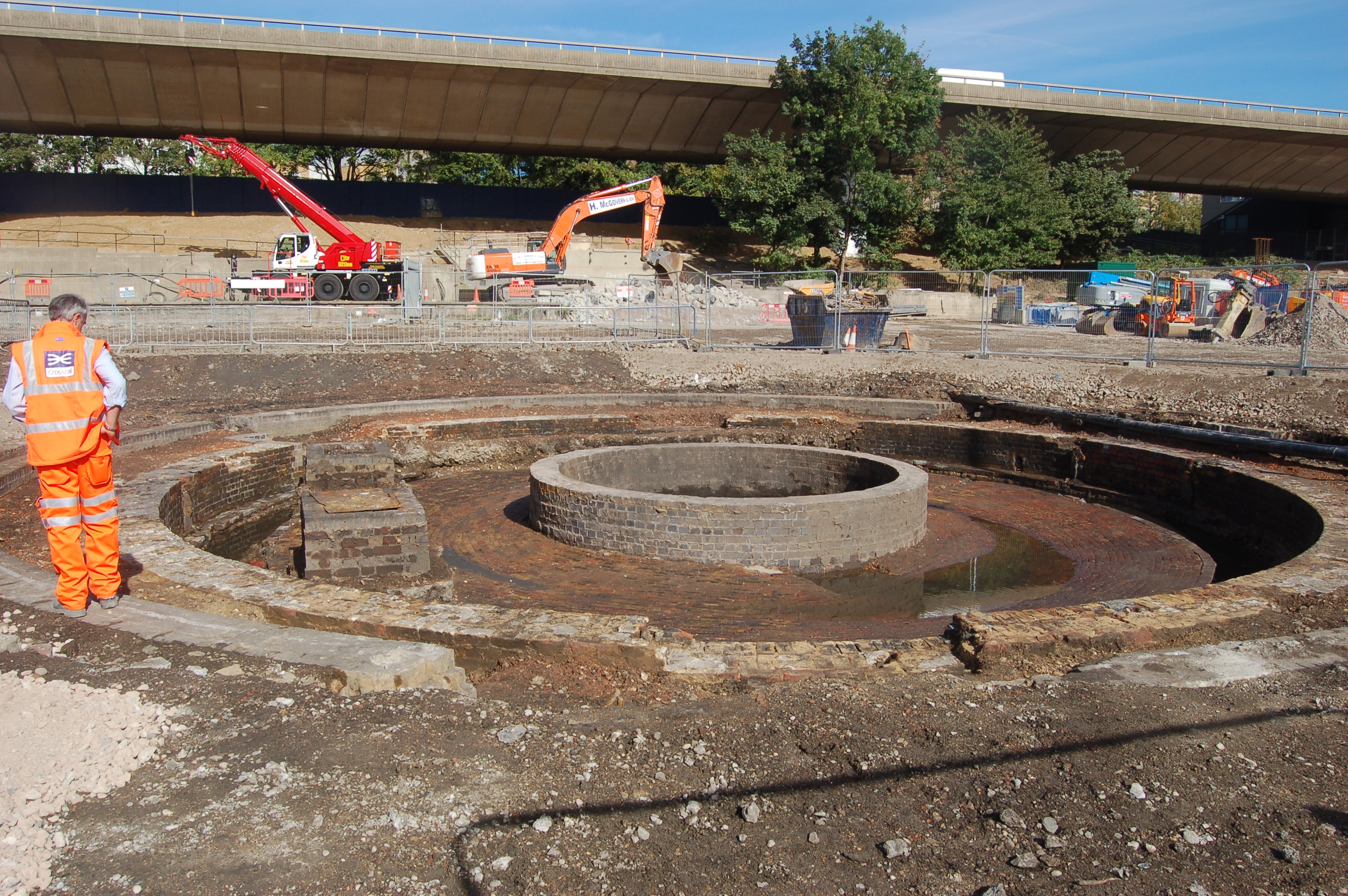
A Victorian era railway turntable, discovered during upgrade works at Westbourne Park tube station in London. Archaeological excavations are often carried out during construction work in the UK to identify and study surviving remnants of prior structures underneath building sites.

There are two basic types of modern archaeological excavation:

1. Research excavation – when time and resources are available to excavate the site fully and at a leisurely pace. These are now almost exclusively the preserve of academics or private societies who can muster enough volunteer labour and funds. The size of the excavation can also be decided by the director as it goes on.
2. Development-led excavation – undertaken by professional archaeologists when the site is threatened by building development. This is normally funded by the developer, meaning that time pressure is present, as well as its being focused only on areas to be affected by building. The workforce involved is generally more skilled, however, and pre-development excavations also provide a comprehensive record of the areas investigated. Rescue archaeology is sometimes thought of as a separate type of excavation but in practice tends to be a similar form of development-led practice. Various new forms of excavation terminology have appeared in recent years such as Strip map and sample some of which have been criticized within the profession as jargon created to cover up for falling standards of practice.

=== Development-led archaeology ===
There are two main types of trial excavation in professional archaeology both commonly associated with development-led excavation: the test pit or trench and the watching brief. The purpose of trial excavations is to determine the extent and characteristics of archaeological potential in a given area before extensive excavation work is undertaken. This is usually conducted in development-led excavations as part of Project management planning. The main difference between Trial trenching and watching briefs is that trial trenches are actively dug for the purpose of revealing archaeological potential whereas watching briefs are cursory examination of trenches where the primary function of the trench is something other than archaeology, for example a trench cut for a gas pipe in a road. In the US, a method of evaluation called a Shovel test pit is used which is a specified half meter square line of trial trenches dug by hand.

== Concepts ==
=== Site formation ===
Archaeological material tends to accumulate in events. A gardener swept a pile of soil into a corner, laid a gravel path or planted a bush in a hole. A builder built a wall and back-filled the trench. Years later, someone built a pigsty onto it and drained the pigsty into the nettle patch. Later still, the original wall blew over and so on. Each event, which may have taken a short or long time to accomplish, leaves a context. This layer cake of events is often referred to as the archaeological sequence or record. It is by analysis of this sequence or record that excavation is intended to permit interpretation, which should lead to discussion and understanding.

The prominent processual archaeologist Lewis Binford highlighted the fact that the archaeological evidence left at a site may not be entirely indicative of the historical events that actually took place there. Using an ethnoarchaeological comparison, he looked at how hunters amongst the Nunamiut Iñupiat of north central Alaska spent a great deal of time in a certain area simply waiting for prey to arrive there, and that during this period, they undertook other tasks to pass the time, such as the carving of various objects, including a wooden mould for a mask, a horn spoon and an ivory needle, as well as repairing a skin pouch and a pair of caribou skin socks. Binford notes that all of these activities would have left evidence in the archaeological record, but that none of them would provide evidence for the primary reason that the hunters were in the area; to wait for prey. As he remarked, waiting for animals to hunt "represented 24% of the total man-hours of activity recorded; yet there is no recognisable archaeological consequences of this behaviour. No tools left on the site were used, and there were no immediate material "byproducts" of the "primary" activity. All of the other activities conducted at the site were essentially boredom reducers."

=== Stratification ===
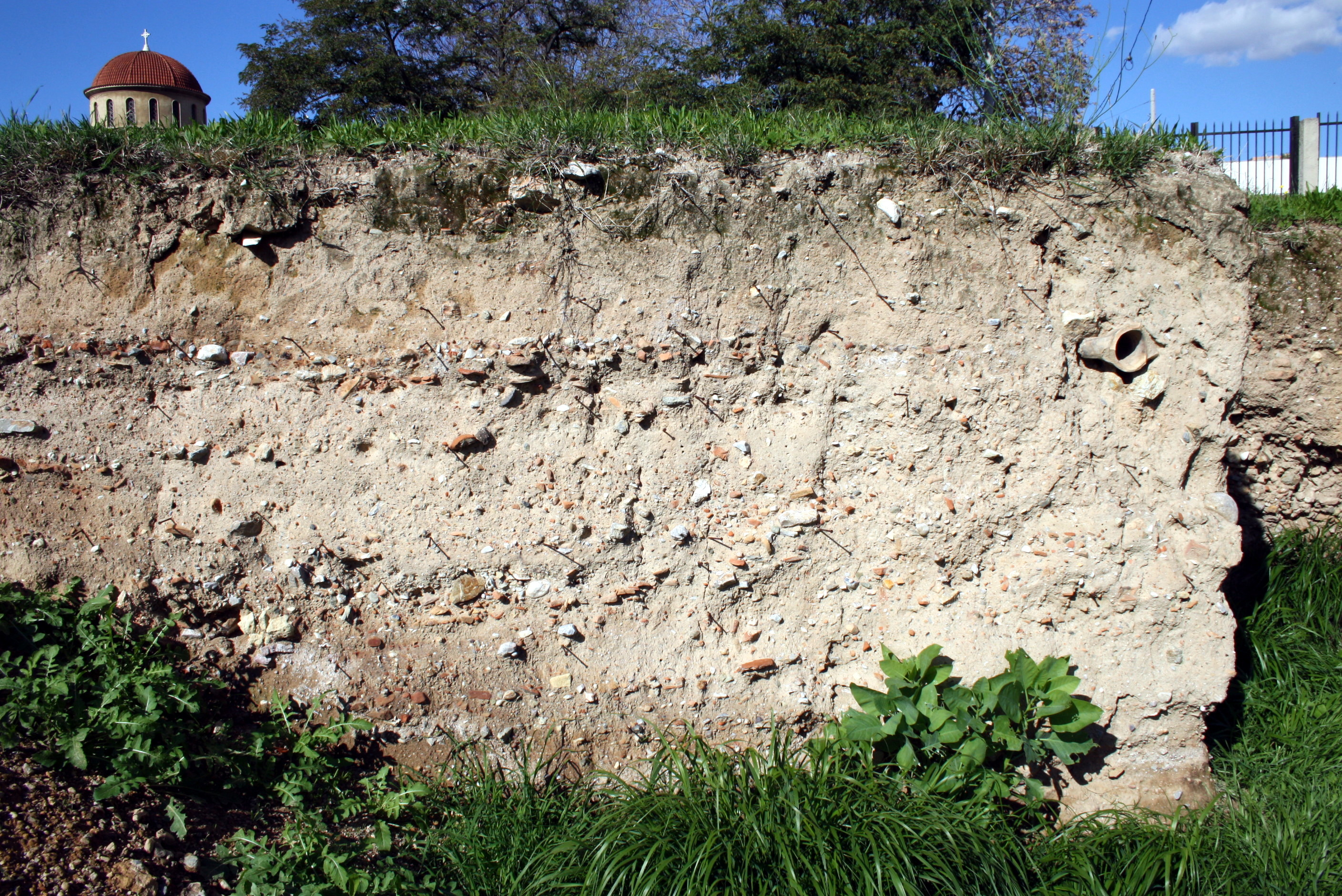
Stratigraphy in the excavation area in the Kerameikos Cemetery (Athens).

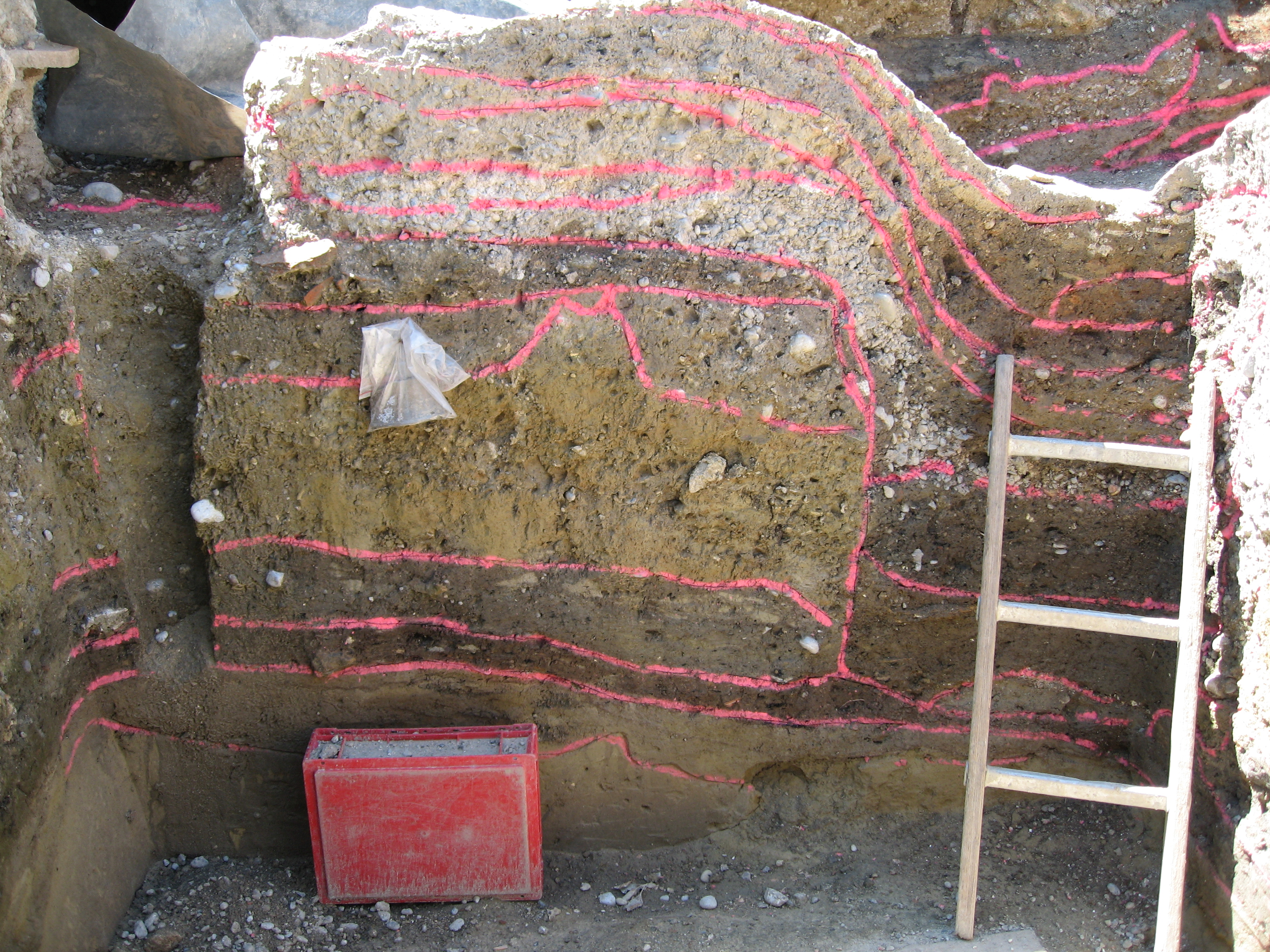
Stratification at an excavation site in Augsburg, Germany

In archaeology, especially in excavating, stratigraphy involves the study of how deposits occurs layer by layer. It is largely based on the Law of Superposition. The Law of Superposition indicates that layers of sediment further down will contain older artifacts than layers above. When archaeological finds are below the surface of the ground (as is most commonly the case), the identification of the context of each find is vital to enable the archaeologist to draw conclusions about the site and the nature and date of its occupation. It is the archaeologist's role to attempt to discover what contexts exist and how they came to be created. Archaeological stratification or sequence is the dynamic superimposition of single units of stratigraphy or contexts. The context (physical location) of a discovery can be of major significance. Archaeological context refers to where an artifact or feature was found as well as what the artifact or feature was located near. Context is important for determining how long ago the artifact or feature was in use as well as what its function may have been. The cutting of a pit or ditch in the past is a context, whilst the material filling it will be another. Multiple fills seen in section would mean multiple contexts. Structural features, natural deposits and inhumations are also contexts.

By separating a site into these basic, discrete units, archaeologists are able to create a chronology for activity on a site and describe and interpret it. Stratigraphic relationships are the relationships created between contexts in time representing the chronological order they were created. An example would be a ditch and the back-fill of said ditch. The relationship of "the fill" context to the ditch "cut" context is "the fill" occurred later in the sequence, i.e., you have to dig a ditch first before you can back-fill it. A relationship that is later in the sequence is sometimes referred to as "higher" in the sequence and a relationship that is earlier "lower" though the term higher or lower does not itself imply a context needs to be physically higher or lower. It is more useful to think of this higher or lower term as it relates to the contexts position in a Harris matrix, which is a two-dimensional representation of a site's formation in space and time.

Understanding a site in modern archaeology is a process of grouping single contexts together in ever larger groups by virtue of their relationships. The terminology of these larger clusters varies depending on practitioner, but the terms interface, sub-group, group and land use are common. An example of a sub-group could be the three contexts that make up a burial: the grave cut, the body and the back-filled earth on top of the body. In turn sub-groups can be clustered together with other sub-groups by virtue of their stratigraphic relationship to form groups which in turn form "phases". A sub-group burial could cluster with other sub-group burials to form a cemetery or burial group which in turn could be clustered with a building such as church to produce a "phase." A less rigorously defined combination of one or more contexts is sometimes called a feature.

=== Phasing ===
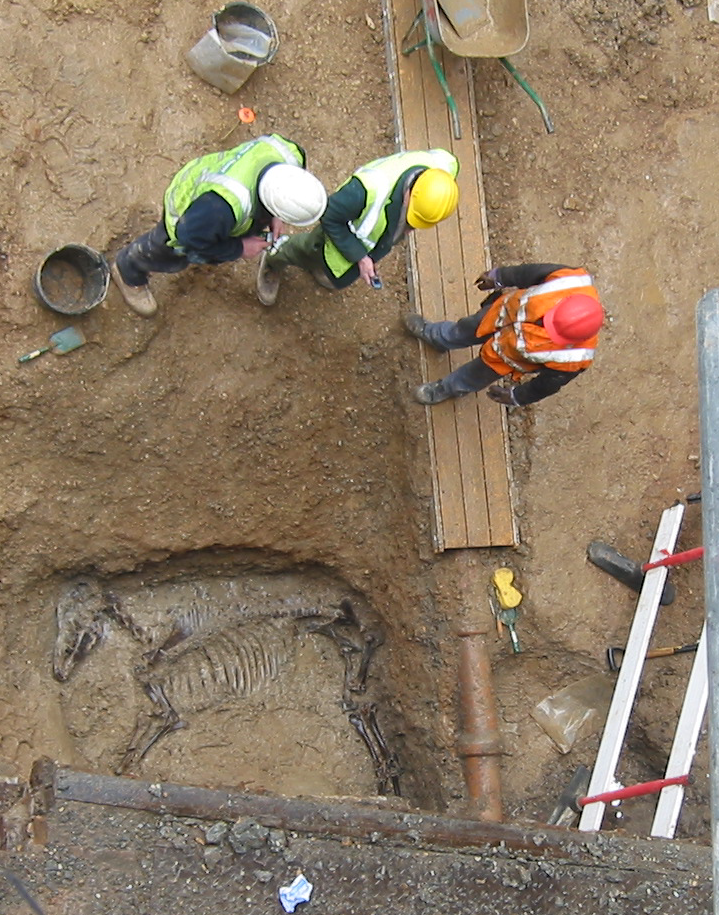
Horse burial in Roman ditch on a development funded site in London. Note "out of phase" pipe intrusion left in for practical reasons

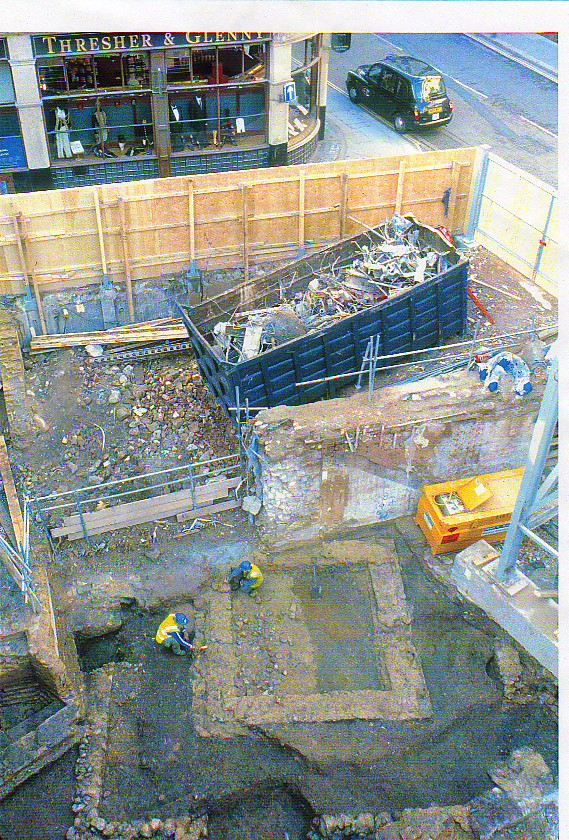
Excavation in phase has reduced this site to the occupation level of a Romano-Celtic temple (56 Gresham Street, London)

Phase is the most easily understood grouping for the layman as it implies a near contemporaneous Archaeological horizon representing "what you would see if you went back to a specific point in time". Often but not always a phase implies the identification of an occupation surface "old ground level" that existed at some earlier time. The production of phase interpretations is one of the first goals of stratigraphic interpretation and excavation. Digging "in phase" is not quite the same as phasing a site. Phasing a site represents reducing the site either in excavation or post-excavation to contemporaneous horizons whereas "digging in phase" is the process of stratigraphic removal of archaeological remains so as not to remove contexts that are earlier in time "lower in the sequence" before other contexts that have a latter physical stratigraphic relationship to them as defined by the law of superposition. The process of interpretation in practice will have a bearing on excavation strategies on site so "phasing" a site is actively pursued during excavation where at all possible and is considered good practice.

An "intrusion" or "intrusive object" is something that arrived later to the phase in the strata, for example modern pipework or the 16th-century bottles left by treasure-hunters at Sutton Hoo.

== Methods ==
Kilwinning Abbey Dig

Excavation initially involves the removal of any topsoil. A strategy for sampling the contexts and features is formulated which may involve total excavation of each feature or only portions.

=== Stratigraphic excavation ===
In stratigraphic excavation, the goal is to remove some or, preferably, all archaeological deposits and features in the reverse order they were created and construct a Harris matrix as a chronological record or "sequence" of the site. This Harris matrix is used for interpretation and combining contexts into ever larger units of understanding. This stratigraphic removal of the site is crucial for understanding the chronology of events on site.

Stratigraphic excavation involves a process of cleaning or "troweling back" the surface of the site and isolating contexts and edges which are definable as either:

1. Discrete, discernible "edges" that are formed by being completely separated from the surrounding surface and therefore stratigraphically later than its surroundings
2. Discrete, discernible "edges" (as in 1.) and have boundaries dictated by the limit of excavation

Following this preliminary process of defining the context, it is then recorded and removed. Often, owing to practical considerations or error, the process of defining the edges of contexts is not followed and contexts are removed out of sequence and un-stratigraphically. This is called "digging out of phase". It is not good practice. After removing a context or if practical a set of contexts such as the case would be for features, the "isolate and dig" procedure is repeated until no man made remains are left on site and the site is reduced to natural.

=== Strip, map and sample ===
"Strip, map and sample" is a method of excavation applied in the United Kingdom to preserve archaeological remains by record in the face of development threats. It involves machine stripping an area, plotting observed features onto a site plan, and then partially excavating those features (sampling). The approach is undertaken when a site is to be destroyed by development and no satisfactory method of preserving archaeological remains in situ can be devised or adequate funding and time have not been factored into development project planning to allow for a full archaeological investigation.

== Tools and techniques ==
=== Mechanical excavation ===
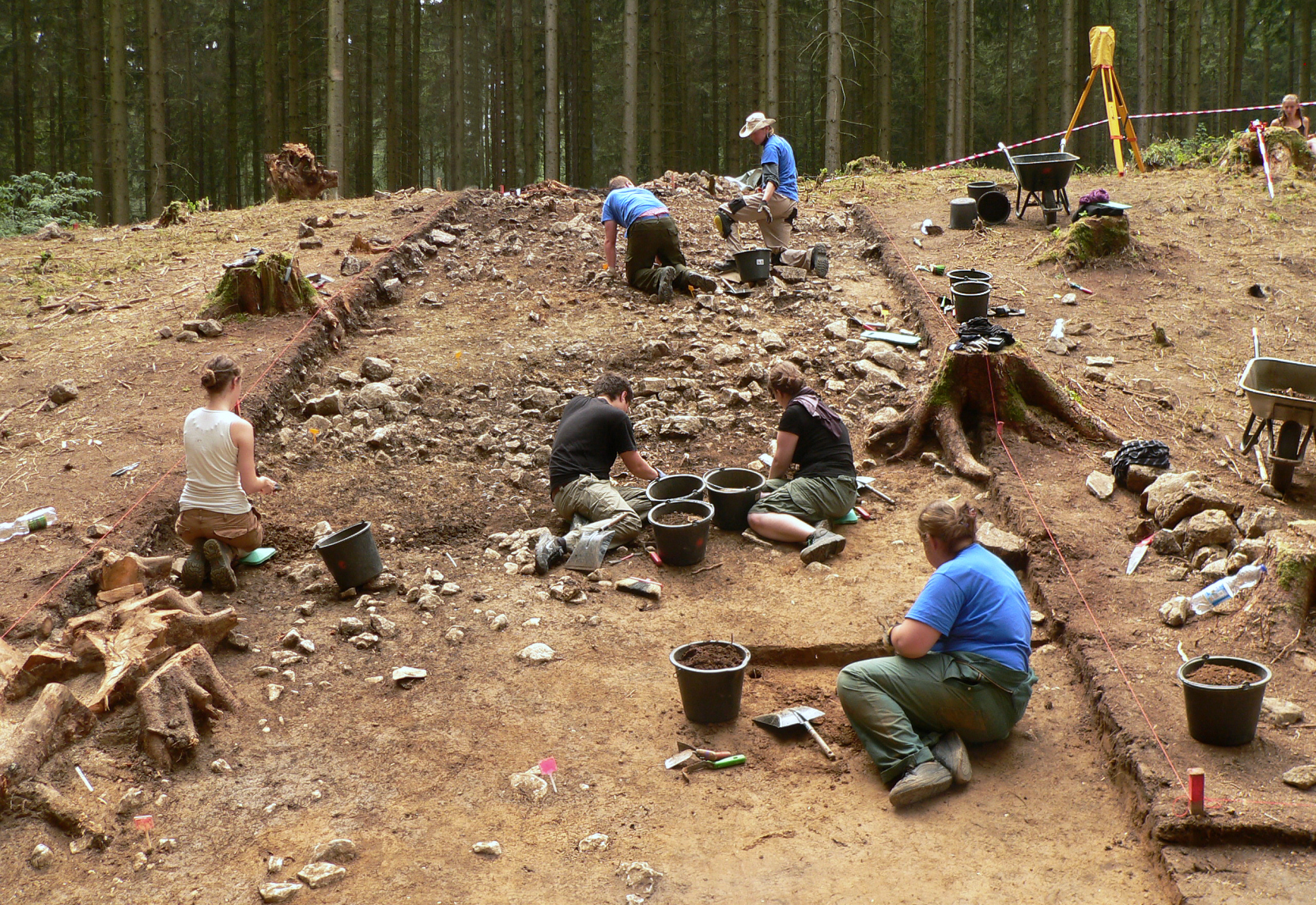
Excavation at the site of the Battle at the Harzhorn (Germany)

This describes the use in excavations of various types and sizes of machines from small backhoes to heavy duty earth-moving machinery. Machines are often used in what is called salvage or rescue archaeology in developer-led excavation when there are financial or time pressures. Using a mechanical excavator is the quickest method to remove soil and debris and to prepare the surface for excavation by hand, taking care to avoid damaging archaeological deposits by accident or to make it difficult to identify later precisely where finds were located. The use of such machinery is often routine (as it is for instance with the British archaeological television series Time Team) but can also be controversial as it can result in less discrimination in how the archaeological sequence on a site is recorded. One of the earliest uses of earth-moving machinery was at Durrington Walls in 1967. An old road through the henge was to be straightened and improved and was going to cause considerable damage to the archaeology. Rosemary Hill describes how Geoffrey Wainwright "oversaw large, high-speed excavations, taking bulldozers to the site in a manner that shocked some of his colleagues but yielded valuable if tantalising information about what Durrington had looked like and how it might have been used." Machines are used primarily to remove modern overburden and for the control of spoil. In British archaeology mechanical diggers are sometimes nicknamed "big yellow trowels".

== Recording ==
Archaeological excavation is an unrepeatable process, since the same area of the ground cannot be excavated twice. Thus, archaeology is often known as a destructive science, where you must destroy the original evidence in order to make observations. To mitigate this, highly accurate and precise digital methods can be used to record the excavation process and its results.

=== Single context recording system ===
Single context recording was developed in the 1970s by the museum of London (as well as earlier in Winchester and York) and has become the de facto recording system in many parts of the world and is especially suited to the complexities of deep urban archaeology and the process of Stratification. Each excavated context is given a unique "context number" and is recorded by type on a context sheet and perhaps being drawn on a plan and/or a section. Depending on time constraints and importance contexts may also be photographed, but in this case a grouping of contexts and their associations are the purpose of the photography. Finds from each context are bagged and labeled with their context number and site code for later cross-reference work carried out post-excavation. The height above sea level of pertinent points on a context, such as the top and bottom of a wall are taken and added to plans sections and context sheets. Heights are recorded with a dumpy level or total station by relation to the site temporary benchmark (abbr. T.B.M). Samples of deposits from contexts are sometimes also taken, for later environmental analysis or for scientific dating.

=== Digital recording ===
Digital tools used by field archaeologists during excavation include GPS, tablet computers, relational databases, digital cameras, 3d laser scanners, and unmanned aerial vehicles. After high quality digital data have been recorded, these data can then be shared over the internet for open access and use by the public and archaeological researchers. Digital imaging or digital image acquisition is digital photography, such as of a physical scene or of the interior structure of an object. The term is often used to include the processing, compression, storage, printing, and display of the images.

== Finds processing ==
Finds and artifacts that survive in the archaeological record are retrieved in the main by hand and observation as the context they survive in is excavated. Several other techniques are available depending on suitability and time constraints. Sieving (screening) and flotation are used to maximize the recovery of small items such as small shards of pottery or flint flakes, or bones and seeds.

=== Flotation ===
Flotation is a process of retrieval that works by passing spoil onto the surface of water and separating finds that float from the spoil which sinks. This is especially suited to the recovery of environmental data stored in organic material such as seeds and small bones. Not all finds retrieval is done during excavation and some, especially flotation, may take place post-excavation from samples taken during excavation.

=== Sieving ===
Sieving during an excavation in Sweden.

The use of sieving (screening) is more common on research-based excavations where more time is available. Some success has been achieved with the use of cement mixers and bulk sieving. This method allows the quick removal of context by shovel and mattock yet allows for a high retrieval rate. Spoil is shoveled into cement mixers and water added to form a slurry which is then poured through a large screen mesh. The speed of this technique is offset by the damage it does to more fragile artifacts.

=== Spot Dating ===
One important role of finds retrieval during excavation is the role of specialists to provide spot dating information on the contexts being removed from the archaeological record. This can provide advance warning of potential discoveries to come by virtue of residual finds redeposited in contexts higher in the sequence (which should be coming offsite earlier than contexts from early eras and phases). Spot dating also forms part of a confirmation process, of assessing the validity of the working hypothesis on the phasing of site during excavation. For example, the presence of an anomalous medieval pottery sherd in what was thought to be an Iron Age ditch feature could radically alter onsite thinking on the correct strategy for digging a site and save a lot of information being lost due to incorrect assumptions about the nature of the deposits which will be destroyed by the excavation process and in turn, limit the site's potential for revealing information for post-excavation specialists. Or anomalous information could show up errors in excavation such as "undercutting". Dating methodology in part relies on accurate excavation and in this sense the two activities become interdependent.

== See also ==
- Archaeological field survey
- Archaeological plan
- Archaeological section
- Cut (archaeology)
- Feature (archaeology)
- Forensic archaeology
- Relationship (archaeology)
- Spit (archaeology)
