= Spoil (archaeology) =

In archaeology, spoil is the term used for the soil, dirt and rubble that results from an excavation, and discarded off site on spoil heaps. These heaps are commonly accessed by barrow runs.

== Spoil management ==
Effective management of spoil is necessary because its volume is in general three times that which it was before excavation. Best practice involves removing the spoil away from the excavation site by mechanical earth moving equipment, or the creation of barrow run fed spoil heaps. In the barrow run method, a ramp is built using spoil transported in barrows along the barrow runs. The spoil heap is progressively enlarged by tipping off the vertical end face of the barrow-run. This method is efficient in storing the maximum amount of spoil in the minimum area, where there is no mechanised means of removing spoil a long distance from the site.
