= Phase (archaeology) =

Process to reveal former land use

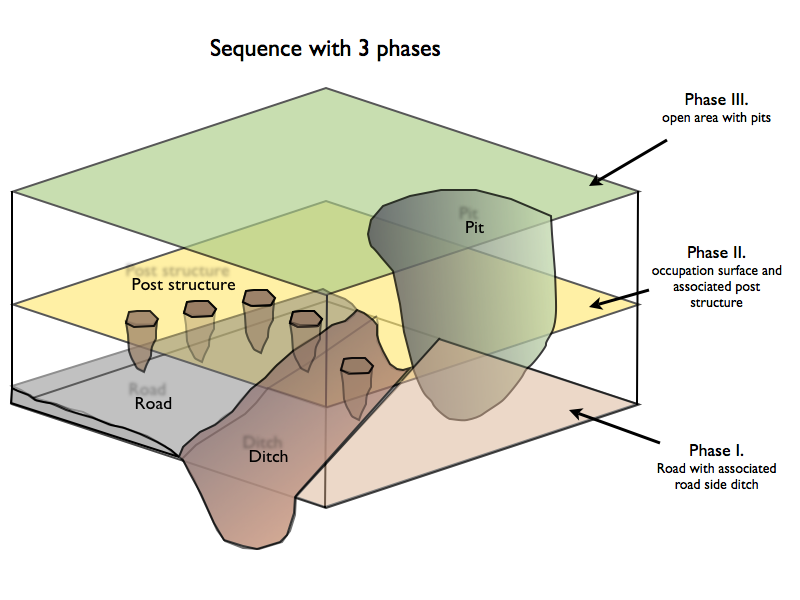
A three-phased sequence

In archaeology, a phase refers to the logical reduction of contexts recorded during excavation to nearly contemporary archaeological horizons that represent a distinct "phase" of previous land use. These often but not always will be a representation of a former land surface or occupation level and all associated features that were created into or from this point in time. A simplified description of phase would be that "a phase is a view of a given archaeological site as it would have been at time X".

Examples of phases that would have no associated occupation surfaces are phases of a site that have been horizontally truncated by later phases and only elements surviving of the truncated phase are those that were below ground level and the subsequent truncation at that time. Subsequent or earlier phases are representations in changing occupation patterns and land use over time. Phase is an extremely important concept in archeological excavation and post-excavation work. Phasing is achieved by compiling smaller groups of contexts together through the use of stratification and stratigraphic excavation into ever larger units of understanding. The terminology of these sub-units or collections of contexts varies depending on practitioner, but the terms interface, sub-group, group, and feature are common.

Phasing a site has a slightly different meaning from "digging in phase". Digging in phase is the process of stratigraphic removal of archaeological remains not to avoid removing contexts that are earlier in time lower in the sequence before other contexts that have a latter physical stratigraphic relationship to them. Digging a site "in phase" is considered good practice and can be thought of as the process of removing the deposits on site in the reverse order that they arrived. Phasing is achieved on site by many methods including intuition and experience, but the main analytical tool post excavation is the Harris matrix. Phase is sometimes termed differently depending on practitioner, examples include the term period but in the main phase is universal.

== Component and focus ==
The less rigorous term "phase" is sometimes used to denote a wider period represented by the contexts that lie stratigraphically between two archaeological horizons, representing the start and end of a particular culture typology. Sometimes the term Locus is used to equate finds from excavated spits, but component can also be used for such a grouping of stratigraphy or for groups of spatially related features.

An example of phase use would be all the contexts between two horizons may represent the entirety of all Saxon occupation on a given site and could be termed as the Saxon phase of the site. However, the block of stratigraphy may have many phases within it as defined by the more rigorous definition of phase.

== See also ==
- Archaeological association
- Archaeological context
- Archaeological section
- Chronological dating
- Cut (archaeology)
- Excavation (archaeology)
- Feature (archaeology)
- Fill (archaeology)
- Harris matrix
- Relationship (archaeology)

== Sources ==
- Principles of Archaeological Stratigraphy. 40 figs. 1 pl. 136 pp. London & New York: Academic Press. ISBN 0-12-326650-5
- A quick Guide to Preliminary Phasing. https://ucl.academia.edu/ReubenThorpe/Papers/189559/A-Quick-Guide-to-Preliminary-Phasing
