= Section (archaeology) =

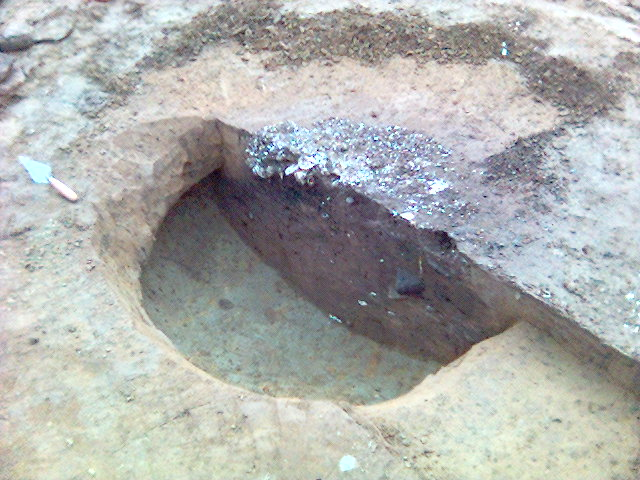
Half-section through a Saxon pit

In archaeology a profile (also called a section) is a view in part of the archaeological sequence showing it in the vertical plane, as a cross section, and thereby illustrating its profile and stratigraphy. This may make it easier to view and interpret as it developed over time.

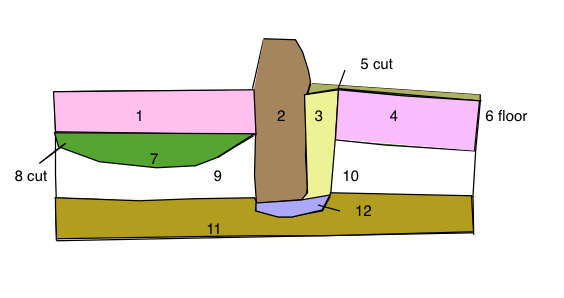
Stylised section drawing

== Profiles ==
Bisection is the usual method whereby one half of a feature is excavated and the remainder left in situ. Large linear features may be profiled at intervals along their lengths. Profiles have fallen out of favor in some schools of practice because detail is often missed in section that is important to the phasing of the site. Examples of detail that is revealed poorly "in section" include gravel or thin cobbled surfaces. The main problem with sections is that the arbitrary location of their placement may "clip" or "just miss" contexts that reveal a different story from the one interpreted by the archaeologist. For instance thin liner features such as wheel ruts may be sectioned at an oblique angle giving the impression of a wider feature as the eye and brain tends to assume that features revealed in cross section have been cut at right angles to the orientation the feature was made. Numerous other false readings of bisections are possible to the unwary, this is why excavation "in plan" is now preferred. Sections are used in conjunction with two-dimensional excavation by plan to determine the origin of archaeological remains. For recording purposes profiles are normally drawn at a scale of 1:10 or 1:20 with their height related to the site benchmark which in turn is related back to a level fixed at some agreed standard of sea level. Orientation should also be recorded. If the profile is instructive a photographic record may also be made.

== Stratigraphic control ==
Sections may also be employed in excavation in temporary fashion as a form of stratigraphic control so as to ascertain the relationship between two or more contexts which may be better examined by the use of a section. Then once a relationship is established contexts can be removed from site in the reverse order they arrived in accordance with the stratigraphic excavation and the creation of a Harris matrix for the sequence being investigated. It is up to the archaeologist on site to determine the best local on site strategy for excavating deposits, be it "in section" or "in plan". In this regard the modern archaeologist uses sectioning as a tool for understanding the site stratigraphically during excavation rather than as an end goal in recording it. These caveats aside sections remain a powerful tool for archaeological investigation. A revival of digging in section with machines has occurred in recent years by a proliferation of limited time constrained development led excavations.

== Quarter sectioning ==
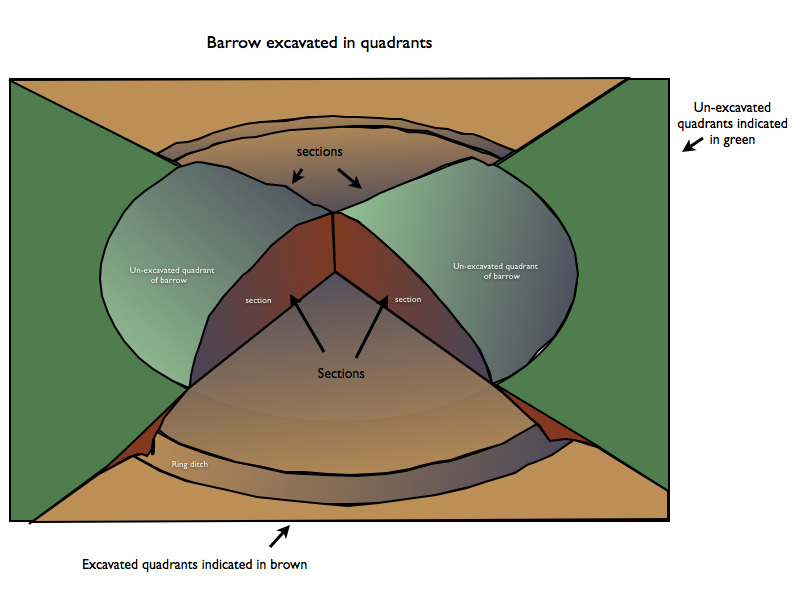
Representation of a barrow excavated by quadrant

Sometimes called digging by quadrant this special case is a procedure for excavating circular features, usually mounds and barrows. Deposits are excavated from four quarters of the feature, starting with two diagonally opposite quadrants and perhaps ending with the other two. The quadrants are slightly offset, so that the outer balk of one is continuous (in reverse) with the outer face of its opposite, going through the center of the feature. After the recording of the sections, the balks may be removed and the rest of the feature excavated. The advantage of quarter sectioning is it allows a look at two complete cross-sections while still allowing excavation in plan thus allowing a better interpretation of the stratigraphy of the site. The merits of this sectioning and balk creation are disputed.

== See also ==
- Archaeological association
- Archaeological context
- Archaeological illustration
- Archaeological plan
- Cut (archaeology)
- Excavation (archaeology)
- Feature (archaeology)
- Fill (archaeology)
- Harris matrix
- Relationship (archaeology)
- Single context recording
- Spit (archaeology)
