= Plan (archaeology) =

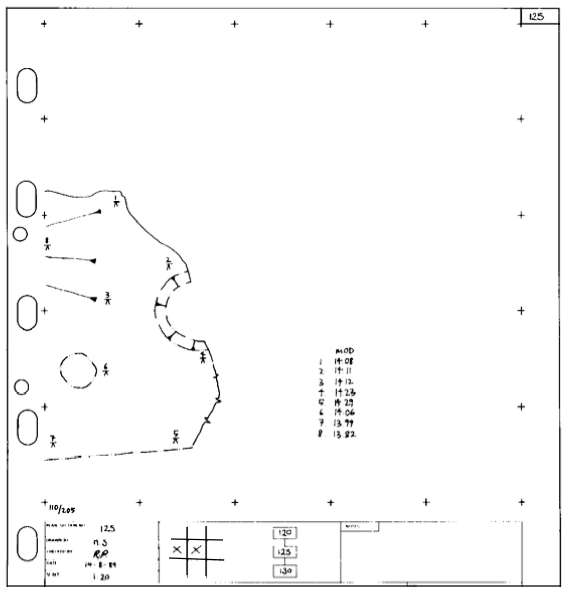
fig 1.Typical single context plan

In archaeological excavation, a plan is a drawn record of features and artifacts in the horizontal plane.

== Overview ==
An archaeological plan can either take the form of

- A "multi context" plan, which is drawn with many contexts on it to show relationships between these features as part of some phase, or
- Alternatively, a single context plan with a single feature is drawn.

Excavated features are drawn in three dimensions using drawing conventions such as hachures. Single context planning, developed by the Museum of London, has become the professional norm. The basic advantage of single context planning is that context plans are drawn on "transparent perma-trace paper" and can be overlaid for later re-interpretation.

Instead of single-context plans, multi-context plans can comprise complete sites, trenches or individual features. In the United Kingdom, the scale of the plans is usually 1:20. They are linked to the site recording system by including known grid points and height readings, taken with a dumpy level or a total station (see surveying). Excavation of a site by the removal of human-made deposits in the reverse order in which they were created is the preferred excavation method and is referred to as stratigraphic area excavation "in plan" as opposed to excavation "in section." Plan and section drawings have an interpretive function and are part of the recording system, because the draughts-person makes conscious decisions about what should be included or emphasised.

== Archaeological plan topics ==
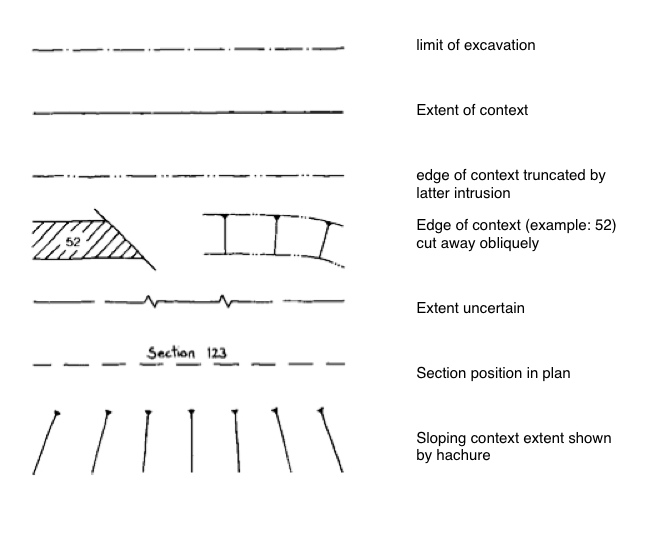
Fig 2. edge of context conventions

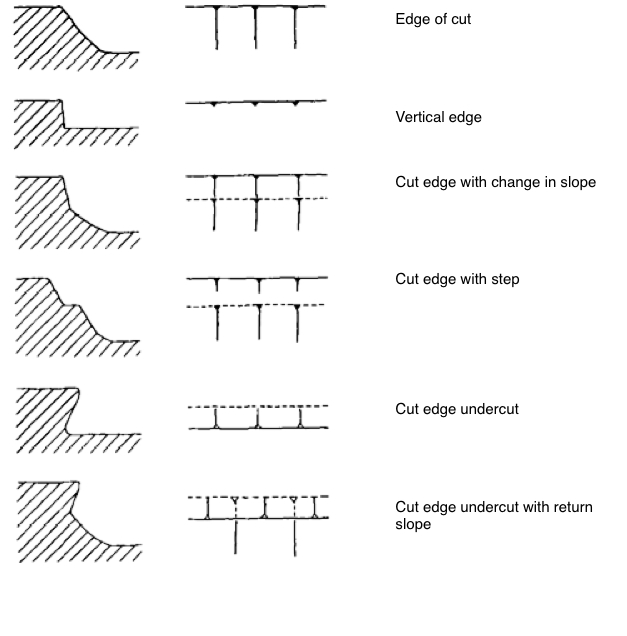
Fig 3. Cut planning hachures

=== The grid ===
It is common and good practice to lay out a grid of 5m squares in excavations to facilitate planning. This grid is marked out on-site with grid pegs that form the baselines for tapes and other planning tools to aid the drawing of plans. It is also common practice to plan for each context on a separate piece of perma-trace that conforms to these 5m grid squares. This is part of the single context recording system (see Fig 1.) The site grid should be tied to a national geomatic database, like the Ordnance Survey.

=== Planning drawing conventions ===
Archaeological planners use various symbols to denote characteristics of features and contexts, and while conventions vary depending on the practitioner, the following are representative:

=== Pre-excavation and base plans ===
On sites with little stratigraphic depth, a pre-excavation multi-context plan is sometimes made of all visible features before any excavation is carried out. This helps in planning strategy since stratigraphy problems on rural sites are minimal as features often cut into the natural, minimizing issues of inter-cutting features. Conversely, planning a multi-context urban site is difficult to achieve on a multi-context plan as the features and deposits, when planned, will obscure each other on the same planning sheet.

== Critics of pre-excavation planning ==
Pre-excavation plans have been critiqued for their limited use on urban or deeply stratified sites. They have also been attacked in professional archaeology, where unscrupulous operators are described as a misused tool to give the impression that the archaeological record for a given site has been dealt with adequately.

This critical point of view contends that comparisons between pre-and post-excavation plans can demonstrate that a site has not been comprehensively excavated based on a pre-ex plan alone. There is a pronounced difference between the two planning phases in many cases. Although many features may be visible at ground level following machining, the proper limits of features are often not so initially discernible until the area of the feature is fully cleaned and subsequently excavated, revealing further features and relationships lower in the sequence.

== See also ==
- Archaeological context
- Archaeological field survey
- Archaeological illustration
- Archaeological section
- Cut (archaeology)
- Excavation (archaeology)
- Feature (archaeology)
- Geomatics
- Harris matrix
- Single context recording
- Site plan
