= Cut (archaeology) =

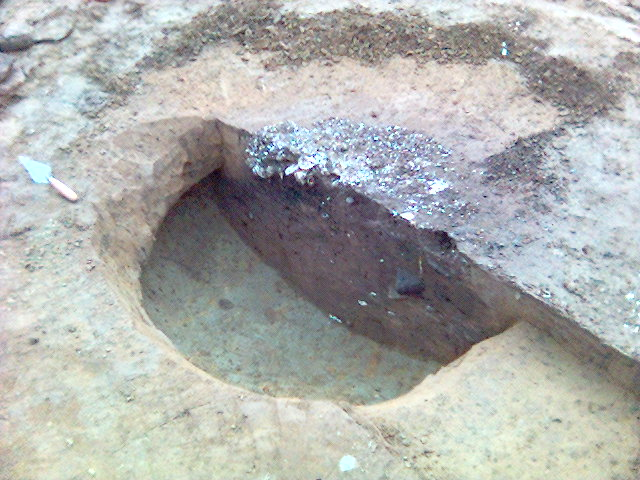
Fig. 1. Saxon pit half sectioned.

In archaeology and archaeological stratification, a cut or truncation is a context that represents a moment in time when other archaeological deposits were removed for the creation of some feature, such as a ditch or pit. In layman's terms, a cut can be thought of as a hole that was dug in the past, though cut also applies to other parts of the archaeological record such as horizontal truncations like terraced ground. A cut context is sometimes referred to as a "negative context", as opposed to a "positive context". The term denotes that a cut has removed material from the archaeological record or natural at the time of its creation, as opposed to a positive context, which adds material to the archaeological record. A cut has zero thickness and no material properties of its own and is defined by the limits of other contexts. Cuts are seen in the record by virtue of the difference between the material it was cut through and the material that back-fills it. This difference is seen as an "edge" by the archaeologists on site. This is shown in the picture (Fig. 1), where a half sectioned Saxon pit has had half its backfill removed and we can clearly see a difference between the ground the pit was cut into, and the material originally filling the pit. Sometimes these differences are not clear and an archaeologist must rely on experience and insight to discover cuts.

== Re-cuts ==
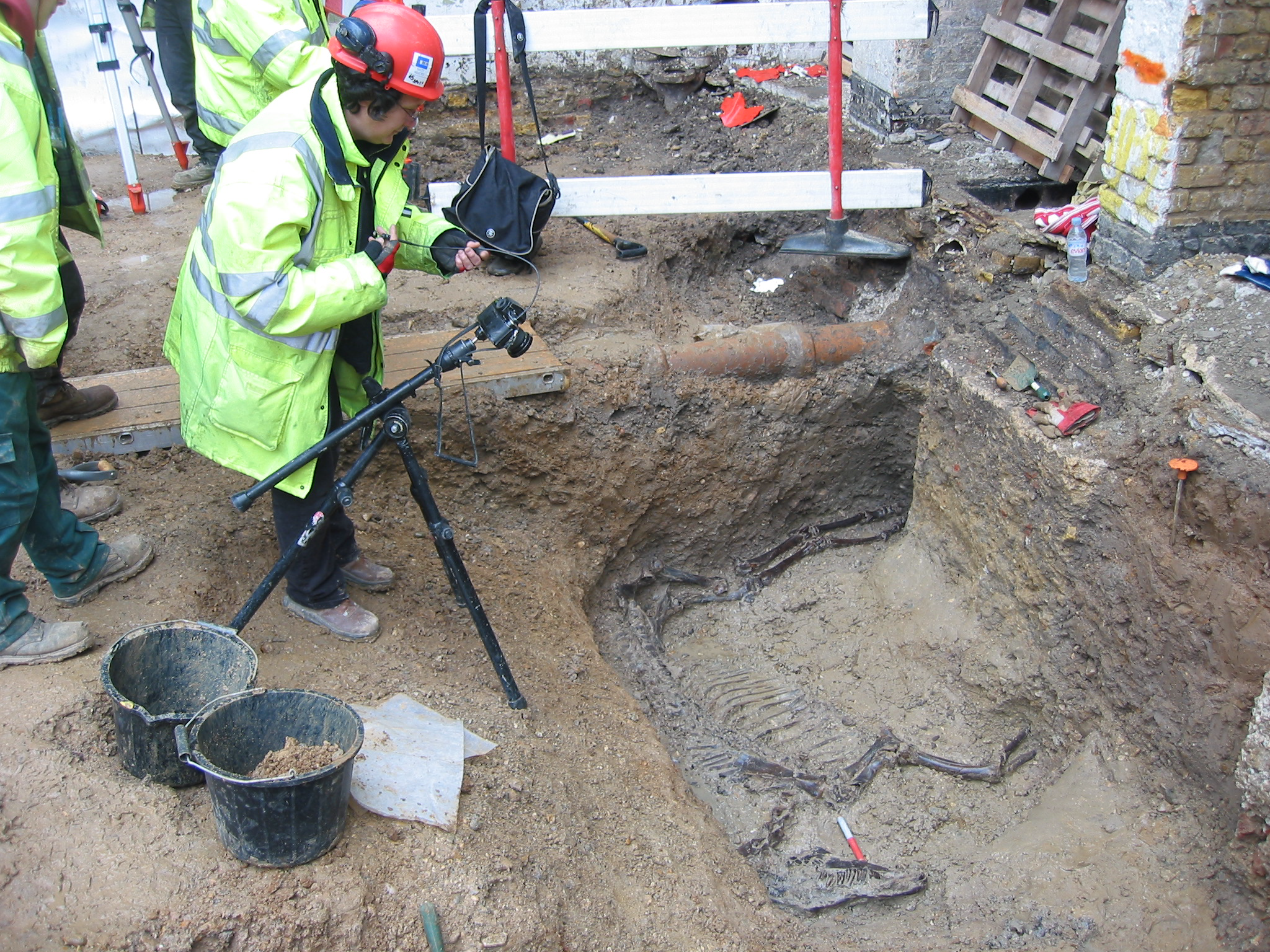
Fig. 2. Photographer takes a record shot of a horse burial in a Roman ditch re-cut.

Re-cuts are cuts made within the confines or near confines of other cuts, often to regain the function of the original cut or harvest material from the original fill. Re-cuts are considered quite valuable as a source of information because they can shed insight on function and attitude over time. An example of re-cutting would be a roadside ditch being re-cut and emptied of silt and detritus as a form of maintenance. Conversely, a roadside ditch that is never re-cut gives a certain impression about the attitude towards the investment in infrastructure the road represents. Re-cuts by their nature are hard to discern because the re-cut can truncate the original cut in part and be completely in the confines of the original fill in other parts. They can even be absent from the record. Cutting is the reason why not all past activity on a site leaves traces of its existence in the sequence.

=== Hypothetical ditch re-cuts shown in section ===
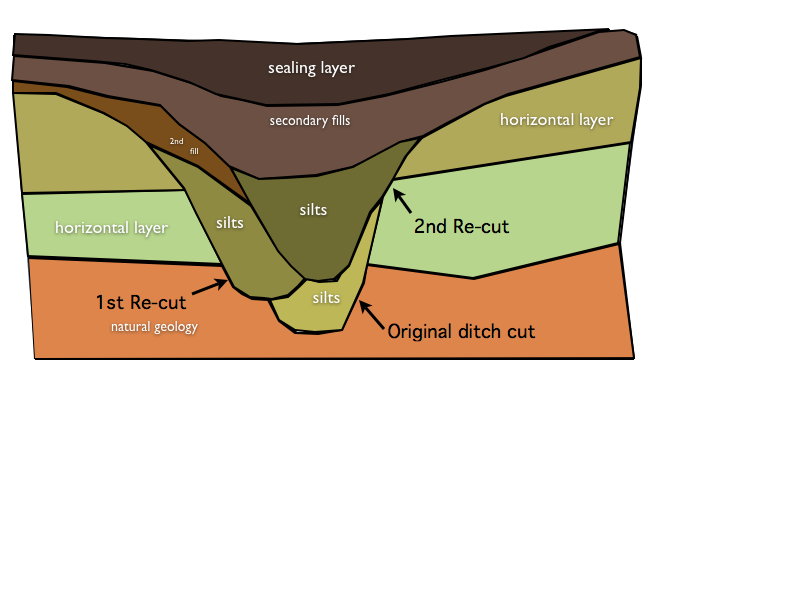
Fig. 3. Section of ditch with at least two re-cuts.

The third image (Fig. 3) shows how a ditch cut with at least two re-cuts may appear when viewed in section. It is possible that numerous other re-cuts took place and were truncated out of the archaeological record by one or more of the re-cuts that has survived.

== See also ==
- Alignment (archaeology)
- Archaeological association
- Archaeological context
- Archaeological plan
- Archaeological section
- Cut (earthmoving)
- Feature (archaeology)
- Fill (archaeology)
- Harris matrix
- Relationship (archaeology)
- Single context recording
