= Glossary of archaeology =

This page is a glossary of archaeology, the study of the human past from material remains.

== A ==
absolute age
The age of an object with reference to a fixed and specific time scale, as determined by some method of absolute dating, e.g. 10,000 BP or 1.9 mya.
absolute dating
Ascertaining the age of an object with reference to a fixed and specific time scale (e.g. calendar years or radiocarbon years), as opposed to relative dating.
aerial archaeology
Archaeological investigations conducted from the air, e.g. using aerial photography or satellite imagery.
alignment
Co-linear arrangement of features or structures with external landmarks or, in archaeoastronomy, an astronomically significant point or axis.
antiquarian
antiquary
A person interested in the collection, curation and/or study of antiquities, particularly in reference to the intellectual tradition that developed in Europe in the 16th–17th centuries and is considered a precursor to modern archaeology.
antiquarianism
An intellectual tradition of inquiry that developed in Europe in the 16th and early 17th centuries AD as a result of new interests in nature, antiquity, the Renaissance of learning, and the addition of time‐depth to people's view of the world.
antiquities
Ancient artefacts, particularly in the context of their trade and collection.
antiquity
The ancient past, in particular the period of the earliest historic civilizations (see classical antiquity).
archaeobotany
Subdiscipline devoted to the analysis of plant remains in the archaeological record.
archaeozoology
See zooarchaeology.
archaeologist
A person engaged in the study or profession of archaeology.
archaeology
archeology
The academic discipline concerned with the study of the human past through material remains.
artefact
artifact
A physical object made by humans.
assemblage
A set of artefacts or ecofacts found together, from the same place and time. Can refer to the total assemblage from a site, or a specific type of artefact, e.g. lithic assemblage, zooarchaeological assemblage.
association
Two or more excavated objects that are thought to be related are said to be in association, e.g. artefacts discovered in close proximity within the same context, or architectural features thought to have been standing at the same time.
avenue
Type of prehistoric monument found in the British Isles, consisting of two parallel lines of standing stones and/or banks and ditches. Examples include the Stonehenge Avenue, Beckhampton Avenue and West Kennet Avenue.

== B ==
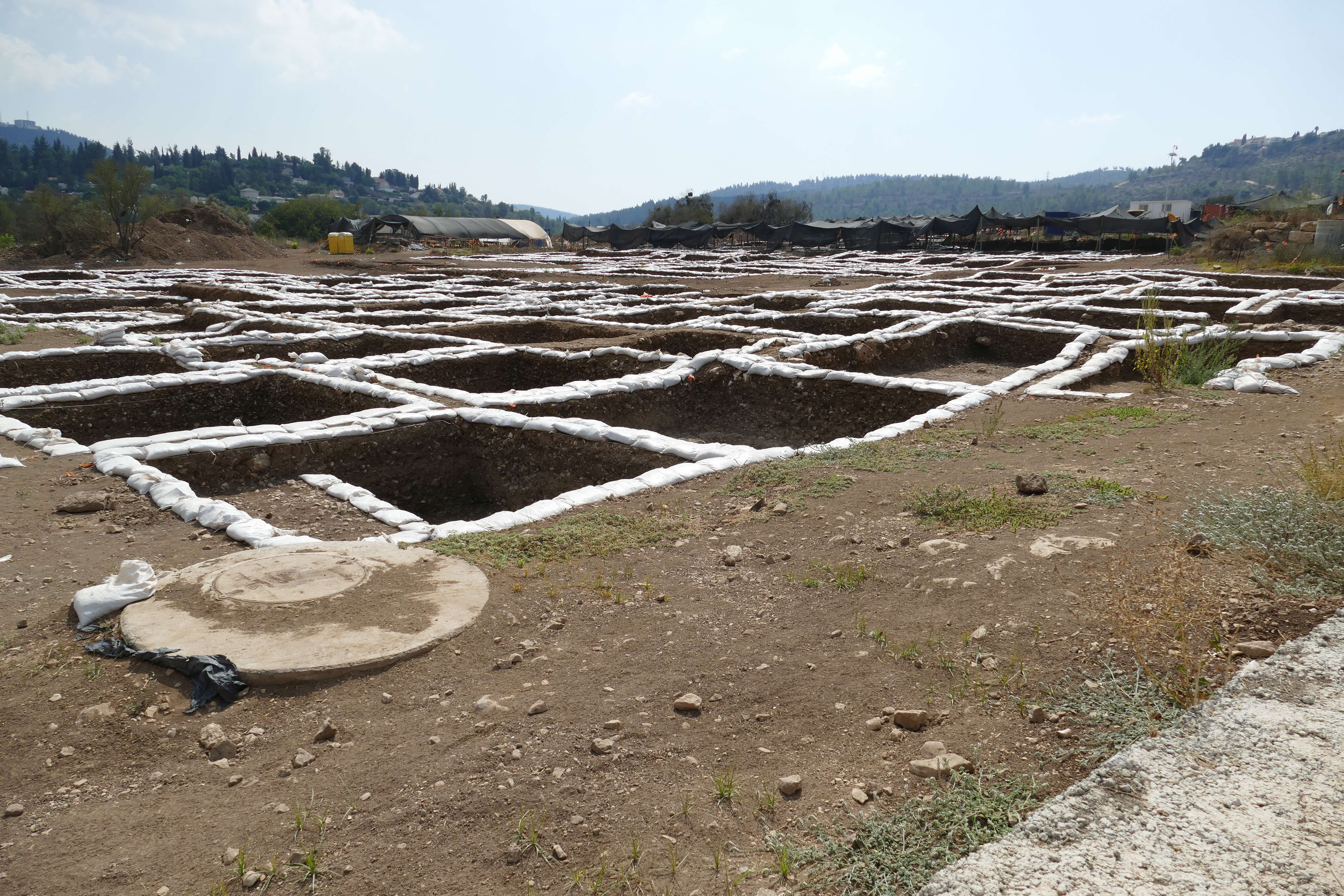
The Wheeler–Kenyon method is characterised by intact baulks (pictured here topped with white sandbags) between each excavation unit.

backfill
1. To re-fill a trench once an excavation has been completed.
2. Material used for backfilling, usually spoil from the original excavation.
baulk
balk
A wall of earth left in place between excavated areas in order to maintain the structural integrity of the trench and/or expose a section to aid in interpretation.
bladelet
Type of stone tool; a small blade characteristic of Upper Palaeolithic Europe.
box–grid method
See Wheeler–Kenyon method.

== C ==
C14 dating
See radiocarbon dating.
context
1. Information relating to where an artefact or feature was found and what it was found in association with.
2. In single context excavation, a well-defined stratigraphic unit relating to a single depositional event, used as the primary unit for recording and analysis.
culture
An archaeological culture is a recurring assemblage of artifacts from a specific time and place that may constitute the material culture remains of a particular past human society.

== D ==
diagnostic
A term used for objects, particularly sherds of pottery, which can be dated to a particular chronological period, and so used to ascertain the date of a particular context.
dig
An informal term for an archaeological excavation.
disturbance
Any change to an archaeological site due to events which occurred after the site was laid down.
dry sieving
A method of sifting artefacts from excavated sediments by shaking it through sieves or meshes of varying sizes. As opposed to wet sieving, which uses water.

== E ==
earthworks
Earthworks are artificial changes in land level, typically made from piles of artificially placed or sculpted rocks and soil
environmental archaeology
Environmental archaeology is the science of reconstructing the relationships between past societies and the environments they lived in.
evaluation
See trial trenching.
excavation
Excavation is the exposure, processing and recording of archaeological remains.

== F ==
fieldwork
Archaeological investigations taking place in the field, e.g. excavations or surveys.
finds
An informal term for artifacts, features and other things discovered by archaeologists.
fill
Material that has accumulated, or been deposited, within a negative feature such as a cut, ditch, or a hollow in a building.
finds processing
The preparation of finds from an excavation for storage or further specialist analysis, typically including washing, labelling, sorting and listing in an inventory.
finds specialist
An archaeologist who specialises in the analysis of a particular type of find, e.g. medieval pottery or prehistoric worked flint.
flotation
Method of separating very small objects from excavated sediments using water. It is particularly important for the recovery of botanical remains and animal bones.
forensic archaeology
Forensic archaeologists employ their knowledge of archaeological techniques and theory in a legal context. This broad description is necessary as forensic archaeology is practiced in a variety of ways around the world.
funerary archaeology
Funerary archaeology is the study of the treatment and commemoration of the dead. It includes the study of human remains, associated artefacts and monuments.

== G ==
geoarchaeology
The application of geology and other earth science techniques to archaeology.
geofact
Rocks or other naturally occurring minerals found in an archaeological context and presumed to have been transported there by humans, but not sufficiently modified to qualify as an artefact.
geoglyph
A form of rock art produced on the ground, either by arranging material on the surface (a positive geoglyph) or removing part of it (a negative geoglyph).
governance archaeology
Governance archaeology seeks to understand the myriad combinations of ways in which people have governed themselves throughout time. A goal in this endeavor is to better understand the full range of options available to modern humans and, to the extent possible, some of the opportunities and pitfalls of different governance characteristics.

== H ==
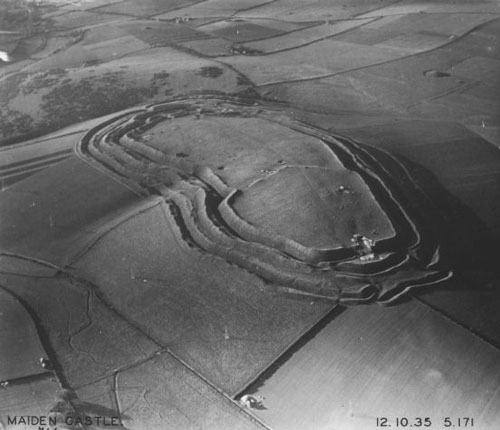
Maiden Castle in Dorset is one of the largest hillforts in Europe

henge
A type of Neolithic earthwork that has a ring-shaped bank and ditch, with the ditch inside the bank.
hillfort
A type of earthwork used as a fortified refuge or defended settlement.
homology
homolog
Similarity in style or form owing to a common origin, as opposed to an analog; see also homology (biology).
horizon
a distinctive type of sediment, artefact, style, or other cultural trait that is found across a large geographical area from a limited time period.

== I ==
industrial archaeology
Subdiscipline devoted to the study of past industry and industrial heritage.
industry
A typological classification of stone tools, e.g. the Mousterian industry, the Acheulean industry.
in situ
Features, artefacts and other remains in their original depositional context, cf. unstratified.

== J ==
jar burial
Inhumation of whole human remains in a ceramic vessel, as opposed to the more common urn burial, where only ashes from cremation are interred.

== K ==
K–Ar dating
Potassium–argon dating; a radiometric dating method useful for samples older than 100,000 years.
kerb
kerbstone circle
A circular retaining wall built around certain types of burial mound.
kill site
A site where people slaughtered and/or butchered animals, especially in a Palaeolithic context, e.g. Naco Mammoth Kill Site, Cooper Bison Kill Site.
killed object
An object which has been deliberately broken or damaged in such a way as to make it unusable.
kiln site
In Southeast Asian archaeology, a site that was the centre for manufacture of particular ceramic ware, e.g. Phnom Kulen, Buriram, Go Sanh, Kalong, Sukhothai.

== L ==
locus
See context.

== M ==
matrix
1. The physical material in which finds and other cultural remains are found, e.g. soil or rock.
2. Harris matrix; a diagram showing the stratigraphic relations between contexts.
megasite
mega-site
A site that is anomalously large in comparison to others from the same period and region, e.g. PPNB megasites, Trypillia megasites.
midden
A midden is an old (typically archaeological) dump for domestic waste.

== N ==
negative geoglyph
See geoglyph.

== O ==
occupation earth
set of deposits believed to represent in-situ settlement at an archaeological site, containing pottery sherds, ashes, animal remains, etc.

== P ==
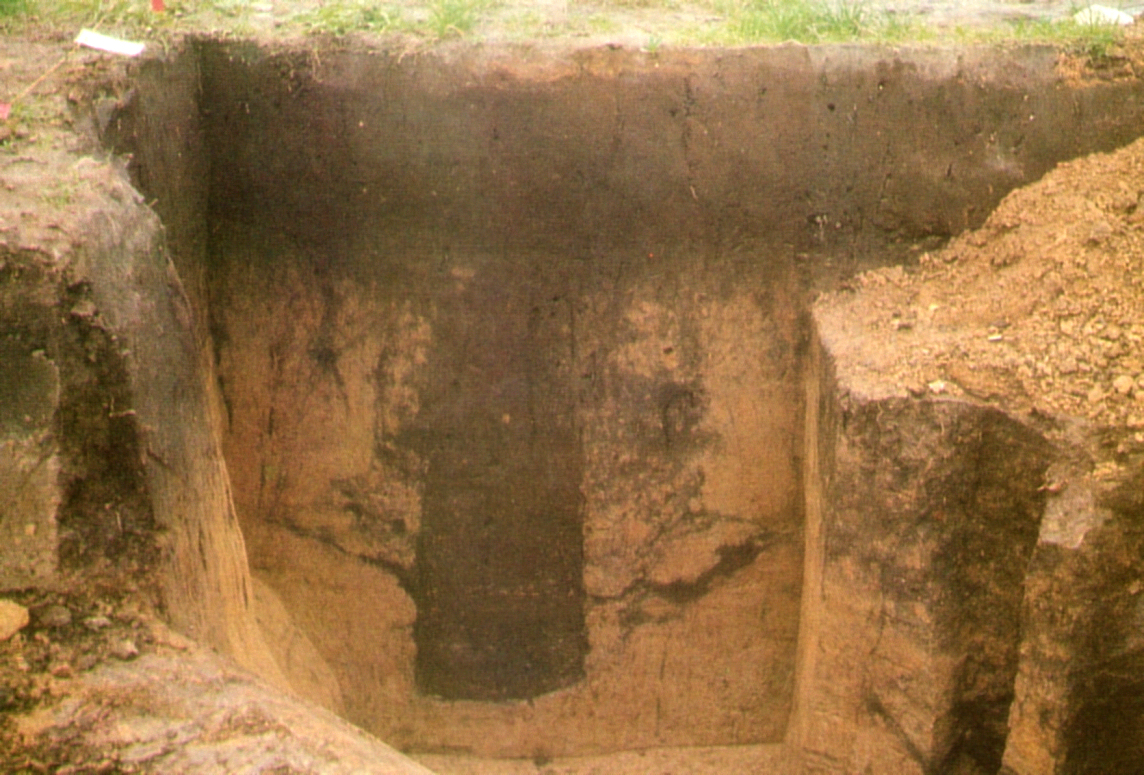
Profile photograph of a posthole that has been half-sectioned

palaeoethnobotany
paleoethnobotany
See archaeobotany.
plan
Horizontal exposure of an excavated area, feature or artefact (as seen from above); a drawing or photograph of the same.
ploughsoil
The soil down to the level at which it will have been disturbed by ploughing.
pollen diagram
pollen profile
pollen spectrum
A series of side-by-side graphs, produced by archaeobotanists and palynologists, showing the frequency of different types (species) of pollen in a soil sample by depth. Usually presented vertically, with the shallowest samples at the top and the deepest at the bottom, to represent a pollen core or other stratified deposit. The depth of the sample corresponds roughly to how old it is, and therefore the vertical axis may also contain an estimate of its absolute age. Used to visualise the environmental history of the place where the sample was taken.
positive geoglyph
See geoglyph.
posthole
Cut feature that once held an upright timber or stone structural member, which can be recognised even after the (wooden) post has decayed because its fill differs from the sediment around it.
postpipe
Remains of an upright timber placed in a posthole.
potassium–argon dating
See K–Ar dating.
potsherd
A fragment of pottery. In specialised usage sherd is preferred over the more common spelling shard, where sherd refers to ceramics and shard to glass.
profile
Vertical exposure of an excavated area, feature or artefact (as seen from the side), possibly also in section; a drawing or photograph of the same.

== Q ==
quarter sectioning
Sometimes called digging by quadrant, it is a procedure for excavating discrete features (especially those circular or ovoid in shape) where two diagonally opposite quadrants are removed, resulting in two complete cross-sections of a feature.

== R ==
radiocarbon dating
absolute dating technique used to determine the age of organic materials less than 50,000 years old. Age is determined by examining the loss of the unstable carbon-14 isotope, which is absorbed by all living organisms during their lifespan. The rate of decay of this unstable isotope after the organism has died is assumed to be constant, and is measured in half-lives of 5730 + 40 years, meaning that the amount of carbon-14 is reduced to half the amount after about 5730 years. Dates generated by radiocarbon dating have to be calibrated using dates derived from other absolute dating methods, such as dendrochronology and ice cores.

== S ==
screening
See sieving
season
A period of time spent working on a particular site or field project.
section
A section is a view of the archaeological sequence showing it in the vertical plane, as a cross section, showing the stratigraphy.
sherd
See potsherd
shovel test pit
test holes, usually dug out by a shovel, in order to determine whether the soil contains any cultural remains that are not visible on the surface.
shovelbum
A colloquial term for professional excavators working in cultural resources management in the United States.
sieving
The use of sieves, screens, and meshes to improve the recovery rate of artefacts from excavated sediments (spoil). Can be divided into dry sieving and wet sieving.
spoil
Loose sediment excavated from a trench.
spoil heap
A pile of sediment from an excavation, usually located next to a trench.

== T ==
trial trenching
A method of archaeological evaluation used to estimate the archaeological potential of a site.
typology
The classification of objects according to their physical characteristics.

== U ==
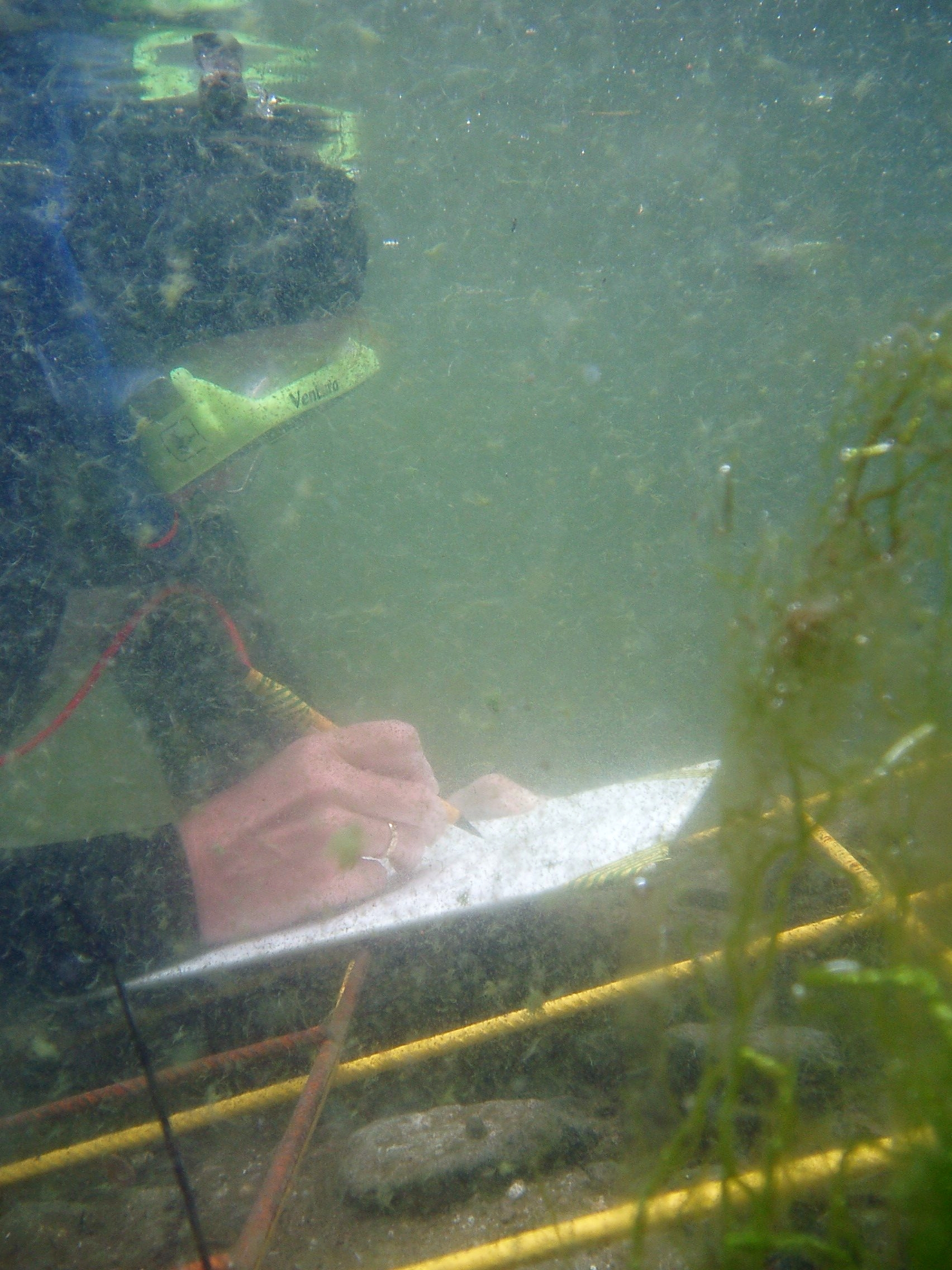
An underwater archaeologist recording a feature in plan

underwater archaeology
Subdiscipline devoted to the study of archaeological remains submerged under seas, lakes, or rivers.
unenclosed
See enclosure.
uniface
Stone tool or other artefact that has only been worked on one side, cf. biface.
unit
1. In stratigraphic excavation, a context.
2. In British commercial archaeology, a company providing archaeological services, e.g. the Birmingham University Field Archaeology Unit.
univallate
Hillfort or other enclosed settlement surrounded by a single line of walls or ramparts, cf. multivallate.
unurned
Cremation burial where the remains were not placed in a container (urn), typical of the Early to Middle Bronze Age in Northern Europe.
updraught kiln
updraft kiln
Type of ceramic kiln which works by drawing hot air from a fire placed adjacent to or below the material to be fired.
urban archaeology
Subdiscipline devoted to the study of archaeology in major cities and towns.
urn
Pottery vessel in which cremated remains were placed for interment; sometimes specially made, but often a repurposed domestic container.
urnfield
Cemetery containing cremation burials in urns. Typical of Late Bronze Age Europe and the eponymous Urnfield culture.
use-wear
Microscopic traces of wear, damage or residue left on the surface of an artefact from use. Use-wear analysis involves studying these traces to discern the function of a tool.

== V ==
virtual archaeology
A subfield of digital archeology that creates and use virtual models and simulations of archaeological sites, artifacts, and processes.

== W ==
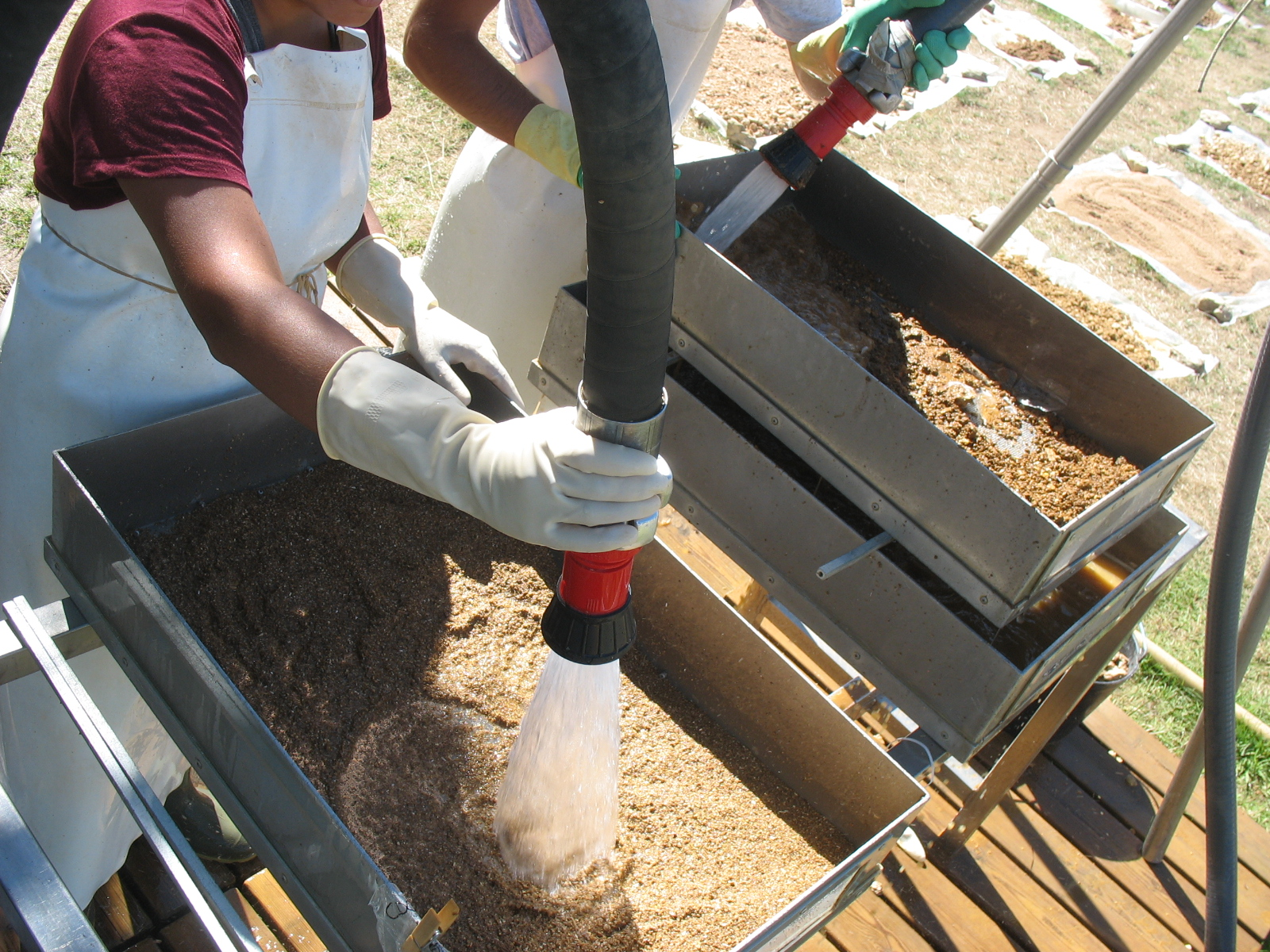
Wet sieving

watching brief
A formal programme of observation and investigation conducted during any operation carried out for non-archaeological reasons.
wet sieving
The use of flowing water to force excavated sediment through a screen or mesh and recover small artefacts. It is more effective than dry sieving in heavier soils and, as part of the process of flotation, can be used to recover very small organic remains.
Wheeler–Kenyon method
box–grid method
Excavation strategy where an area is divided into a grid of square trenches and baulks are left between each square, exposing the site in both plan and profile. Developed by Mortimer Wheeler and Tessa Wheeler at Verulamium (1930–35) and refined by Kathleen Kenyon at Jericho (1952–58).

== X ==
X-ray fluorescence (XRF)
Method of analysing the chemical composition of an object by exposing it to X-rays and examining the resulting secondary (fluorescent) X-rays emitted.

== Y ==
yield
Information important in prehistory or history.

== Z ==
zooarchaeology
Subdiscipline devoted to the analysis of animal remains in the archaeological record.

== See also ==
- Outline of archaeology
- Table of years in archaeology
- Glossary of history

== Bibliography ==
- Bray, Warwick; Trump, David (1970). A Dictionary of Archaeology. Allen Lane. ISBN 0713901373.
- Darvill, Timothy (2009). The Concise Oxford Dictionary of Archaeology. Oxford: Oxford University Press. doi:10.1093/acref/9780199534043.001.0001. ISBN 9780191727139.
- Feder, Kenneth (2008). Linking to the Past: A Brief Introduction to Archaeology (2nd updated ed.). Oxford: Oxford University Press. ISBN 978-0-19-533117-2.
- Kipfer, Barbara Ann (2000). Encyclopedic Dictionary of Archaeology. New York: Kluwer Academic/Plenum Publishers. ISBN 978-0-306-46158-3.
- Pearsall, Deborah M., ed. (2008). Encyclopedia of Archaeology. Amsterdam: Elsevier. ISBN 9780123739629.
- Renfrew, Colin; Bahn, Paul (2008). Archaeology: Theories, Methods, and Practice (5th updated ed.). London: Thames & Hudson. ISBN 978-0-500-28719-4. OCLC 441377624.
- Robb, John G. (1998). "The 'ritual landscape' concept in archaeology: a heritage construction". Landscape Research. 23 (2): 159–174. Bibcode:1998LandR..23..159R. doi:10.1080/01426399808706533. ISSN 0142-6397.
- Shaw, Ian; Jameson, Robert, eds. (1999). A Dictionary of Archaeology. Oxford: Blackwell. doi:10.1002/9780470753446. ISBN 9780470753446.
- Smith, Clare, ed. (2014). Encyclopedia of Global Archaeology. New York: Springer. doi:10.1007/978-1-4419-0465-2. hdl:2268/163881. ISBN 978-1-4419-0465-2. S2CID 220616743.
