= List of World Heritage Sites in Vietnam =

Location of UNESCO World Heritage Sites within Vietnam

The United Nations Educational, Scientific and Cultural Organization (UNESCO) World Heritage Sites are places of importance to cultural or natural heritage as described in the UNESCO World Heritage Convention, established in 1972. Vietnam accepted the convention on 19 October 1987, making its natural and cultural sites eligible for inclusion on the list. As of 2025, there are nine World Heritage Sites in Vietnam, including six cultural sites, two natural sites, and one mixed. Vietnam holds the second-highest number of World Heritage Sites in Southeast Asia, after Indonesia with ten sites.

The Complex of Huế Monuments was the first site in Vietnam to be inscribed on the list at the 17th session of the World Heritage Committee held in Colombia in 1993. Two cultural sites from Quảng Nam were listed in 1999: Hội An Ancient Town and Mỹ Sơn Sanctuary. Hạ Long Bay and Phong Nha – Kẻ Bàng National Park were listed as natural sites in 1994 and 2003, respectively, before receiving the extension on the criteria for exceptional geological and geomorphologic values by the World Heritage Committee in 2000 and 2015. (Note: Hạ Long Bay was first listed as a natural site in 1994 under criterion (vii). Six years later, in 2000, the World Heritage Committee extended its recognition for exceptional value for geomorphology, which satisfies the criterion (viii). In 2023, it was extended and renamed from 'Hạ Long Bay' to 'Hạ Long Bay–Cát Bà Archipelago' under two additional criteria (ix) and (x).) (Note: Phong Nha – Kẻ Bàng National Park was first listed as a natural site in 2003 under the criterion (i). Twelve years later, in 2015, the World Heritage Committee renominated and extended its recognition for exceptional geological and geomorphologic values, which satisfies the (viii), (ix) and (x) criteria.) The Central Sector of Imperial Citadel of Thăng Long was inscribed in 2010, coinciding with the Millennial Anniversary of the Thăng Long capital. Tràng An Scenic Landscape Complex was inscribed in 2016, the first mixed site in Southeast Asia. The most recent site added is the Yen Tu-Vinh Nghiem-Con Son, Kiep Bac Complex of Monuments and Landscapes.

After being recognized, the sites became popular tourist attractions. They are also considered to be driving forces behind the growth of tourism in the country. According to the Ministry of Culture, Sports and Tourism, Tràng An was the most popular World Heritage Site in Vietnam, attracted more than 6 million visitors and raised 867.5 million VND in 2019 alone. In addition to its World Heritage Sites, Vietnam also maintains eight properties on its tentative list.

== World Heritage Sites ==
UNESCO lists sites under ten criteria; each entry must meet at least one of the criteria. Criteria i through vi are cultural, and vii through x are natural.

* Transnational site

List of World Heritage Sites in Vietnam
Site	Image	Location (municipality)	Year listed	UNESCO data	Description
Complex of Huế Monuments	Meridian Gate of the Imperial City of Huế in 2017	Huế	1993	678; iv (cultural)	The Complex of Huế Monuments is located in and around Huế, the former imperial capital of Vietnam under the Nguyễn dynasty. Despite having suffered from the effects of three wars, the site is well-preserved and remains a remarkable construction of the 19th century.
Hạ Long Bay–Cát Bà Archipelago	Ha Long Bay in 2008	Quảng Ninh and Hải Phòng	1994	672; vii, viii, ix, x (natural)	Ha Long Bay features more than 1600 karst limestone pillars and isles in various shapes and sizes, developed in a warm and wet tropical climate. The limestone monolithic islands rise from the ocean, topped with thick jungle vegetation. Several of the islands are hollow, creating enormous caves. Both the Hạ Long Bay and Cát Bà Archipelago are high biodiversity centers, with more than 700 limestone mountains and islets.
Hội An Ancient Town	Houses with small shops in Hoi An in 2020	Da Nang	1999	948; ii, v (cultural)	Located near the mouth of the Thu Bồn River, Hội An Ancient Town comprises timber-frame buildings, which include architectural monuments, an open market, and a ferry quay. Its architecture reflects a blend of indigenous and foreign influences from Chinese, Japanese and European cultures. It is an example of a Southeast Asian trading port dating from the 15th to the 19th century.
Mỹ Sơn Sanctuary	Mỹ Sơn Sanctuary in 2019	Da Nang	1999	949; ii, iii (cultural)	Mỹ Sơn is a cluster of abandoned and partially ruined Hindu temples, constructed between the 4th and the 13th century by the kings of Champa. The temples are dedicated to the worship of the Hindu divinity Shiva. The site reflects the spiritual and political life in the Champa Kingdom.
Phong Nha – Kẻ Bàng National Park and Hin Nam No National Park*	A cave in Phong Nha – Kẻ Bàng National Park in 2007	Quảng Bình	2003	951bis; viii, ix, x (natural)	Phong Nha – Kẻ Bàng is located in the middle of the Annamite Range. Phong Nha – Kẻ Bàng has a diverse limestone karst ecosystem, containing terrestrial and aquatic habitats, forests, savanna, and large caves. The Sơn Đoòng Cave is considered to have the world's largest natural cave passage. In 2025, the site became transnational with the extension to Hin Nam No National Park.
Central Sector of Imperial Citadel of Thăng Long	Đoan Môn Gate of Imperial Citadel of Thăng Long in 2015	Hanoi	2010	1328; ii, iii, vi (cultural)	Built in the 11th century by the Lý dynasty, the Imperial Citadel contains buildings that parallel the late 19th-century architecture and the Southeast Asian culture. The site played an important role in the regional political power of Đại Việt for almost thirteen centuries.
Citadel of the Hồ Dynasty	The South gate of Tay Do castle, a building in the Citadel of the Hồ Dynasty, in 2008	Thanh Hóa	2011	1358; ii, iv (cultural)	The Hồ dynasty built the citadels in 1397, which lie between the Mã and Bưởi rivers. The site shows a concept of royal power, new trends in technology and commerce in an imperial city. Its construction adapted the Confucian philosophy within a primarily Buddhist culture.
Tràng An Landscape Complex	Tam Cốc Rice Valley of Tràng An Scenic Landscape Complex in 2013	Ninh Bình	2016	1438bis; v, vii, viii (mixed) (Note: Tràng An Scenic Landscape Complex is the first mixed site in Southeast Asia.)	Tràng An is a scenic area located at the southern margin of the Red River Delta. It contains limestone karst peaks with valleys. There are archaeological traces of human activity for more than 30,000 years, dating back from the Neolithic and Bronze Ages. Hoa Lư was the ancient capital of Vietnam, established in the 10th and 11th centuries.
Yên Tử – Vĩnh Nghiêm – Côn Sơn, Kiếp Bạc Complex of Monuments and Landscapes	Yen Tu in 2020	Quảng Ninh, Bắc Giang, and Hải Dương	2025	1732; iii, vi (cultural)	The site is a series of monuments and landscapes located on Đông Triều mountain range. This is the homeland of the Trần dynasty of Đại Việt in the 13th and 14th century, and the ancestral land of Trúc Lâm Zen Buddhism. This area is known for its landscapes, and historical-cultural relics. The site encompasses multiple relic areas, pagodas, and temples.

== Tentative list ==
In addition to the sites inscribed on the World Heritage List, member states can maintain a list of tentative sites that they may consider for nomination. Nominations for the World Heritage List are only accepted if the site was previously listed on the tentative list. As of 2026, Vietnam has recorded eight sites on its tentative list.

List of tentative sites in Vietnam
Site	Image	Location (municipality)	Year listed	UNESCO data	Description
Hương Sơn Complex of Natural Beauty and Historical Monuments	One of the zone's cave pilgrimage sites.	Hanoi	1991	960; (mixed)	The site is an important ecological zone and cultural zone, with archaeological sites dating back 10,000 years and geological formations dating back 200 million years. The Perfume Pagoda Festival is held annually, with the participation of hundreds of thousands of people. The Hương Sơn Complex comprises three groups of temple sites: The Hương Tích group, The Long Vân group, and The Tuyết Pagoda Group.
The Area of Old Carved Stone in Sapa	One of the engraved stones of Sapa in 2011	Lào Cai	1997	959; (mixed)	The site is home to more than 200 stones and megaliths, carved with different images and complicated designs. Images of mountains, hills, and fields can be seen, as well as traces of three kinds of writing system: the pictographs of Han Chinese, talismans of Tày and Dao ethnic groups.
Cát Tiên National Park (Note: UNESCO previously listed Cát Tiên National Park as the 411th Biosphere Reserve Zone in the world in 2001. In 2005, the Ramsar Convention recognized Bàu Sấu Wetlands (belongs to the park) as one of the Ramsar Sites of the world.) (Note: Following a 2013 report by the International Union for Conservation of Nature, in which advising not to inscribe Cát Tiên National Park as a natural World Heritage Site, Vietnam withdrew its application weeks before the annual World Heritage Committee in June 2013. The report identified two proposed hydropower projects, quarrying, unregulated tourism, illegal trade in species and poaching as major threats.)	Water buffaloes at the Cát Tiên National Park in 2008	Đồng Nai	2006	5070; vii, ix, x (natural)	Cát Tiên National Park is a natural resource with many rare and endemic genes of fauna and flora. It is a part of the wet tropical forest complex and one of the few natural forests remaining in Vietnam. The national park takes an active part in the control of floods and protects the water source of Trị An Dam.
Con Moong Cave	—	Thanh Hóa	2006	5072; (cultural)	The site, located within the Cúc Phương National Park, was excavated by archaeologists in 1976. The place contains cultural traces of residents of Sơn Vì, Hòa Bình and Bắc Sơn cultures, where people resided continuously from 13,000 to 7,000 years ago. The archaeological site consists of 10 different soil layers.
Ba Bể – Na Hang Natural Heritage Area	Ba Bể Lake in 2014	Tuyên Quang and Bắc Kạn	2017	6262; vii, x (natural)	Ba Bể – Na Hang Natural Heritage Area is covered by primeval forests on limestone mountains with diverse fauna and flora. The karst mountains are surrounded by Gâm River, Năng River, and Ba Bể Lake. Many caves have existed for over 10,000 years. The nominated area consists of four main parts: Ba Bể National Park, Nam Xuân Lạc Nature Reserve, Na Hang Nature Reserve, and Lâm Bình Protection Forest.
Óc Eo–Ba Thê archaeological site	Ba Thê Mountain	An Giang	2022	6572; ii, iii, v (cultural)	Óc Eo–Ba Thê archaeological site has about 40 cultural relics of religious, burial and residence sites which have been discovered from the early 1940s to the end of the 20th century, proving the existence of a culture associated with Funan from the beginning of AD until the 7th century. It was the main transshipment point between the Indian Ocean and the Pacific Ocean through the Kra Strait at that time.
Van Long-Kim Bang-Tam Chuc Sanctuary: Delacour's Langur Bio-cultural Landscape	A marsh with mountains in the background	Ninh Binh	2026	6971; v, ix, x (mixed)	
Cu Chi Tunnels	A small open trap door leading into an underground tunnel	Ho Chi Minh City	2026	7038; iv, vi (cultural)	

== See also ==
- Protected areas of Vietnam
- List of national parks of Vietnam
- Special National Sites (Vietnam)
- UNESCO Intangible Cultural Heritage Lists
- Members of the Global Geoparks Network
- ASEAN Heritage Parks
- List of Ramsar wetlands of international importance
