= Steep Cliff Cave =

Cave in Thailand

Steep Cliff Cave (Thai: Tham Pa Chan) is an archaeological site in Pang Mapha district, Mae Hong Son Province, northwestern Thailand, which was used by the Hoabinhian culture as a game jump in the early Holocene. The site is commonly discussed together with two other caves from Mae Hong Son, namely Spirit Cave and Banyan Valley Cave.

== Description ==
The cave is a two-meter deep hole with an opening in the top, located on a narrow ledge on a steep cliff, which would have been heavily forested during its period of occupation, two kilometres from the Pai River. The site was used by the Hoabinhian culture as a game jump. Hunters would herd animals over the cliff face to their deaths and then butcher the carcasses on the site. This is one of the few examples of this hunting tactic known from prehistoric Southeast Asia.

The site consists of a large ashy midden with five occupation layers, containing bones which have all been smashed and burnt. This midden contains the remains of: three wild cattle, two water buffalos, thirteen deer, two pigs, one red giant flying squirrel, and one Himalayan striped squirrel. It is likely that these animals were killed and cut up nearby and then brought to Steep Cliff Cave so that they could be smoked.

Flaked stone tools were found at the site. Some of these may have been used for smashing open bones to get at the marrow. Patterns of wear on the lithics show that they were used for a long time and that many of them were used to work hardwood.

There is a human burial on the site which appears to post-date the main period of activity.

== Dating ==
The chronology of the Hoabinhian culture is controversial and different methods of dating at Steep Cliff Cave give different results, but the most recent studies seem to confirm that the site was occupied in the early Holocene.

Radiocarban dating of charcoal samples taken during the initial excavation dated layer 3 to 5477 BC (± 160 years) and layer 4 to 3158 BC (± 110 years). This is the reverse of the stratigraphic order (i.e. layer 4 ought to be older than layer 3), indicating that the sequence has been disturbed, probably by the human burial. Radiocarbon dating of organic finds from the site in 2021 found a scatter of dates. The earliest date came from a freshwater pearl mussel of 7940 BC (± 30 years). The latest is a specimen of human bone dating to 5440 BC (± 30 years), which derives from the later burial that has disturbed parts of the stratigraphy of the site.

Luminescence dating on two ceramic fragments from the site gave dates of 6390 BC (± 670 years) and AD 860 (± 50 years). The date of the earlier sherd appears to indicate that the Hoabinhian culture had developed pottery already in the Early Holocene, but this has been a matter of controversy (centring on finds from the nearby Spirit Cave) and further research is needed to clarify the situation.

== History of excavation ==
Steep Cliff Cave was excavated in early 1973 by Chester Gorman, who had earlier excavated the nearby Spirit Cave and Banyan Valley Cave. He died unexpectedly without publishing a final report, but the small finds, Gorman's excavation diaries and photographs survive.

== See also ==
- List of caves

== Sources ==
- Higham, Charles; Thosarat, Rachanie (2012). Early Thailand: from prehistory to Sukhothai (1. ed.). Bangkok: River Books. ISBN 978-9749863916.
- Bannanurag, Rachanie (1988). Charoenwongsa, P.; Bronson, B. (eds.). Prehistoric studies: the stone and metal ages in Thailand (1st ed.). Bangkok: Thai Antiquity Working Group with the support of the John F. Kennedy Foundation of Thailand. pp. 61–79. ISBN 978-9748680453.
- Conrad, Cyler; Shoocongdej, Rasmi; Marwick, Ben; White, Joyce C.; Thongcharoenchaikit, Cholawit; Higham, Charles; Feathers, James K.; Tumpeesuwan, Sakboworn; Castillo, Cristina C.; Fuller, Dorian Q.; Jones, Emily Lena (April 2022). "Re-evaluating Pleistocene–Holocene occupation of cave sites in north-west Thailand: new radiocarbon and luminescence dating". Antiquity. 96 (386): 280–297. doi:10.15184/aqy.2021.44.
