= Banyan Valley Cave =

Cave and archaeological site in Thailand

- Interactive map of Banyan Valley Cave
- Periods: Upper Paleolithic, Neolithic
- Cultures: Hoabinhian
- Location: Pang Mapha district, Mae Hong Son Province, Thailand

Site notes
- Archaeologists: Chester Gorman

Banyan Valley Cave is an archaeological site in Pang Mapha district, Mae Hong Son Province, northwestern Thailand. It was sporadically occupied from around 4000 BC until ca. 1000 AD by the Neolithic Hoabinhian culture and subsequent metal culture. It was discovered and excavated by Chester Gorman in 1972, following his excavations of the nearby Spirit Cave.

== Description ==
The cave is located at the western end of Banyan Valley, near Ban Mai Hang, 50 metres above the point where a stream disappears into a sinkhole. It consists of two caves: a lower cave containing travertine, gravel, and ashy deposits, and an upper cave containing gravel and ashy deposits. Each of these measure ca. 24 x 14 m in area.

The excavations consisted of a 1.5 m^{2} test pit dug in March 1972 and a major excavation later the same year covering an area stretching 20 m in from the mouth of the cave with a width of 12 m. The depth of archaeological deposits varies from 25 cm to 200 cm. The stratigraphy was complex and muddled, due to burrowing animals and intrusion from later occupation layers. The techniques used in excavation, especially spit digging, use of soil colour to identify different layers, and minimal on-site recording, tended to increase this confusion. These issues limit the conclusions about chronology that can be drawn from the site.

Nevertheless, it appeared possible to distinguish three levels, which can be roughly dated, based on the typology of the lithic and ceramic finds, radiocarbon dating, and thermoluminescence dating, all of which indicate that the occupation is more recent than the nearby Spirit Cave.

- General level 1 (GL1), the more recent level, which is reddish brown, homogenous, and fine-textured, and contained charcoal, limestone, organic material, cord-marked and plain-burnished pots, and a flaked stone projectile point. It dates between the first millennium BC and the first millennium AD.
- General Level 2 (GL2), consisting of light grey and red soil, containing broken stones, flint cores, and flakes. It might date to 3410-2000 BC.
- General Level 3 (GL3) consists of deep red-brown soil, sometimes with yellowish bits. It contains the earlier hearths. The lower part of this layer appeared to predate human habitation. It probably dates ca. 4000-3000 BC.

Finds from GL2 and GL3 belong to the Hoabinhian culture. GL2 seems to derive from the main period of occupation, when activity centred on the well-lit western part of the cave. The finds indicate that the cave was used for flint knapping at that point.

More than 24 hearths were discovered in all three layers, often superimposed on top of one another. These hearths came in three types:

- a concentration of charcoal or ash,
- a concentration of charcoal or ash in a round dip c. 15-20 cm across,
- a concentration of charcoal or ash surrounded by stones

The majority of the hearths were of the first type and there were many examples of the second type, but only two of the third. Hearths contained bones, some mollusc shells, and (in two cases) fragments of bamboo and wooden tools.

Six asymmetric rounded pits with vertical walls were found, one in GL1 and the others in GL2. The first of these contained carbonised rice grains.

A set of flat stones had been laid down to form the floor of part of GL1 and cobbles were laid down in part of the western portion of the cave in GL2. Two postholes were recorded, one with a diameter of 5 cm and a depth of 18 cm in GL1 and another in GL2 with a diameter of 6 cm.

=== Finds ===
The lithics from GL2 and GL3 derive from the Hoabinhian culture. The Hoabinhian layers include an edge-ground slate knife, and a marque Bacsonienne. Finds from GL1 are substantially different and later.

Pottery appears mostly in the uppermost layer and is fairly rare even there. All pottery on the site is typologically similar. In GL2 it appears that cord-marked and plain pottery is associated with Hoabinhian lithics.

Floral remains from the site include wild rice in GL1 bamboo, legumes, and canarium nuts. GL2 contains gourds, prunus, palms, and canarium nuts. GL3 contains beans and peas. None of this evidence indicates the practice of agriculture. The faunal remainsconsist of a wide range of species in GL2, probably due to the intensity of habitation, and smaller amounts in GL 1 and GL3. None of these finds indicate animal domestication.

== See also ==
- List of caves

== Sources ==
- Reynolds, Timothy E. G. (1992). "Excavations at Banyan Valley Cave, Northern Thailand: A Report on the 1972 Season". Asian Perspectives. 31 (1): 77–97. ISSN 0066-8435.
- Higham, Charles; Thosarat, Rachanie (2012). Early Thailand: from prehistory to Sukhothai (1. ed.). Bangkok: River Books. ISBN 978-9749863916.
