= Mán Bạc =

Archaeological site in Vietnam

- Location in Vietnam
- 20.1°N 106.0°E
- Type: habitation and cemetery
- Cultures: Phùng Nguyên culture
- Location: Yên Mô District, Ninh Bình Province, Vietnam
- Region: Red River Delta

History
- Built: 1,850 BC
- Abandoned: 1,650 BC

Site notes
- Excavation dates: 1999, 2001, 2004-5, 2007

Mán Bạc is a Neolithic archaeological site located in Yên Mô District, Ninh Bình Province, Vietnam, dated from around 1,850–1,650 BC. Mán Bạc is associated with the Phùng Nguyên culture. With 95 burials found at the site, Mán Bạc is the largest and most intact site associated with the Phùng Nguyên culture, surpassing the site at Lung Hoa.

== Description ==
Mán Bạc is located on a loess plateau in an area dotted with limestone karst. The site currently lies adjacent to a Catholic cemetery. The site is currently about 25 km (16 mi) away from the modern coastline; however, at the time of occupation at the site, the coastline was much closer and less than 1 km (1 mi) away.

Although the term Neolithic has been used to describe Mán Bạc, Oxenham suggests that "Pre-Neolithic Pottery using Cultures" (PNPC) would be a more appropriate term to describe the culture at the site. Although Man Bac is linked to the Bronze Age Phùng Nguyên culture, no bronze artifacts were recovered from the site. Mán Bạc also lacks direct evidence for rice cultivation. However, the people at Man Bac are thought to have farmed rice and raised pigs and dogs, as well as supplementing their diet with protein derived from hunting and fishing.

Mán Bạc is characterized by a high mortality rate for infants and subadults, very high levels of fertility, and high levels of population growth. Most of the burials were interred with grave goods, with pottery being predominant.

== Artifacts ==
The artifact assemblage at Mán Bạc consists of a diverse range of tools and finished goods, including items such as nephrite beads, bracelets, bangles, rings, adzes, axes, chisels, blades, bone hooks, grinding stones, net sinkers, shell ornaments, lithic ornaments and ceramics.

=== Pottery ===
Mán Bạc is typified by pottery in the form of small globular pots with everted rims. Phùng Nguyên-style pottery is found at Mán Bạc, with evidence of some localization. Regionally, the pottery at Mán Bạc appears to exhibit more similarities with those from Guangxi and Guangdong than those from the lower Mekong valley or northeastern Thailand. The Mán Bạc pottery also shows similarities to Assemblage F from Sham Wan in Hong Kong. One of the pottery vessels from Mán Bạc, in the shape of a drum, shows strong similarities to a bronze drum from the late Shang dynasty in China, which suggests that there was cultural contact with the bronze cultures from China at that time at Mán Bạc.

== Fauna ==
The faunal assemblage at the site consists primarily of fish and mammalian remains. The mammalian faunal assemblage is dominated by the remains of Sus scrofa. Most of the Sus remains are thought to belong to domesticated pigs; however, the pig remains appear to maintain some features associated with wild boars, and were likely in the initial process of domestication.

Additional mammalian fauna found at Mán Bạc include rats, dogs, Aonyx cinerea, civet, rhinoceros, Muntiacus muntjak, deer, Bos or water buffalo, and Cetacea. Compared to the number of taxa found at older Hoabinhian sites in northern Vietnam, which often included over 20 different taxa, the number of taxa hunted at Man Bac is clearly more limited. This suggests that hunting was likely less of a primary subsistence pursuit for the people of Man Bac.

Many fish remains were also recovered from the site. The fish assemblage was dominated by the remains of marine and brackish water fish, with Acanthopagrus being the predominant species found. Other common species recovered from the site include sharks, rays, Lates calcarifer, Siluriformes and Serranidae. The remains of Trionychidae were also found at the site.

== Human remains ==
Craniometric data suggests that the population at Mán Bạc was composed of a heterogeneous population. Several of the Mán Bạc craniums exhibit morphological similarities to the craniums found at later Dong Son culture sites from the Metal Period, which was mostly characterized by narrow long faces, flat glabellas and nasal roots and round orbits, while some retained morphological similarities to earlier craniums from Hoabinhian or Bacsonian sites. Overall, the cranial morphologies at Man Bac appear to share the most similarities with those from the Metal Period, modern Southeast Asians, and the Chinese Neolithic site at Weidun from the lower Yangtze River. The variance in dental morphology was also higher at Mán Bạc than at later sites associated with the Metal Period.

=== Health ===
The individuals at Mán Bạc display a very high frequency of dental caries, the highest of any ancient archaeological site in Southeast Asia; the only other site in Southeast Asia with dental carry frequencies approaching that at Man Bac is Khok Phanom Di. As is the case for Khok Phanom Di, the high prevalence of dental caries at Mán Bạc is partially skewed by the high frequencies of dental caries found in its female inhabitants; at both sites, the females were found to have over twice as many dental caries as the males.

The individuals at the site, especially the children, show extremely high frequencies of porotic hyperostosis, a condition generally associated with poor health.

=== Archaeogenetics ===
In 2018, researchers successfully extracted low coverage nuclear DNA from the petrous bone of 8 of the individuals from the cemetery at Mán Bạc. The individuals at Mán Bạc appear to be genetically homogeneous. The individuals at Mán Bạc show a mix of East Asian farmer and east Eurasian hunter-gatherer ancestry, with close genetic affinity for modern Austroasiatic speakers.Mán Bạc populations can be modeled as having Dushan-related ancestry (65.8%) and Longlin-related ancestry (34.2%). They can also be modeled as having Indus Periphery-related ancestry (3.5%), with the rest being Dushan-related. According to a 2020 study, Mán Bạc populations constitute the basal ancestry for most populations from Eastern Siberia and Eastern Asia, including Korea, Japan, China and Austroasiatic-speaking groups from Southeast Asia. Populations carrying both Mán Bạc and Devil's Gate genomes admixed throughout these regions until the Neolithic period, which is probably accompanied by climate change and barriers.
