= Ban Rai rockshelter =

Cave in Thailand

- Location in Thailand
- 19°31′N 98°31′E
- Location: Northern Thailand

Site notes
- Elevation: 740–760 m (2,430–2,490 ft)

The Ban Rai rockshelter is a cave near Ban Huai Rai village in the Pang Mapha district of northwestern Thailand, which was inhabited by the Hoabinhian culture in the late Pleistocene and early Holocene (ca. 12,500-10,250 BP) and by the Log Coffin culture ca. 100 BC - 800 AD. The cave, which opens to the north, is 105 metres wide, 42 metres deep, and 30 metres deep. It is located next to a waterfall, where the Nam Lang stream flows into a sinkhole, about 10 km southwest of Tham Lod rockshelter.

== Findings ==
There are a series of ashy layers on the cave floor. The lower, earlier levels contain stone tools, shellfish, and animal bones. The stone tools found in these layers consist of cores and flakes (both used and wasted), hammers, and flakes for resharpening. These tools were produced, repaired, and used on the site. There is a round pit, about 30 cm deep, containing a human burial, probably male, in a flexed position, which is radiocarbon dated to ca. 9,800 BP.

Log Coffins of Grave's types 2A, 2B, and 1B, reaching up to 5 m in length, have been found on the site, along with a set of wooden posts which once held the coffins in place. The installation of these coffins has significantly disrupted the stratigraphy of the site. These coffins should be associated with finds of iron tools and cord-marked pottery in the uppermost layers of the ashy deposit on the cave floor.

A set of cave paintings in the eastern part of the cave depict animals, people, and symbols. These cannot be dated, making it uncertain whether they belong to the Hoabinhian or Log Coffin periods, or some other occupation. In the largest scene, five people in motion (dancing?) surround a large circle with four hooks emerging from it. They are accompanied by a crescent moon, animals, and various symbols. Another painting shows a person carrying a bow.

== Excavation ==
The site was investigated as part of surveys in the 1980s and 1990s and was excavated in the early 2000s as part of the Highland Archaeology Project led by Rasmi Shoocongdej. Three trenches were dug, in the western, central, and eastern parts of the cave, with the goal of uncovering remains from both the Hoabinhian and Log Coffin periods.

== Bibliography ==
- Higham, Charles; Thosarat, Rachanie (2012). Early Thailand: from prehistory to Sukhothai. Bangkok: River Books. ISBN 978-9749863916.
- Treerayapiwat, Cherdsak (2005). "Patterns of Habitation and Burial Activity in the Ban Rai Rock Shelter, Northwestern Thailand". Asian Perspectives. 44 (1): 231–245. ISSN 0066-8435.
