= Tham Lod rockshelter =

Cave and archaeological site in Thailand

Tham Lod Rockshelter
- Location in Thailand
- 19°34′18.9″N 98°16′37.9″E
- Periods: 35,000 BCE to 9,800 BCE
- Location: Northern Thailand

Site notes
- Excavation dates: 2001
- Archaeologists: Rasmi Shoocongdej

Tham Lod Rockshelter (Thai: เพิงผาถ้ำลอด) is a 30 metre deep cave near the Nam Lang stream in northern Thailand, which was occupied by the Hoabinhian culture from the late Pleistocene to the late Holocene period. Archaeological remains of hearths, a workshop for the production of stone tools, and a set of burials have been found. The site has provided information on human activities in the area, including burials, living habits, gathering, and tool making, and social interactions. It is located 10 km northeast of the Ban Rai rockshelter.

The site has been protected by the Ambassador's Fund for Cultural Preservation since 2001 and was originally excavated by Rasmi Shoocongdej from Silpakorn University in 2002 with funding from the Thai Research Fund and in 2006 with funds from the US Ambassador Fund for Cultural Preservation.

== Human occupation ==
Human occupation in Tham Lod is attested from 40,000 BP to 10,000 BP (Late Pleistocene, Early Holocene, and Late Holocene). The population was highest during the Holocene period, when biomass was greater because of the wet climate. Migrants from China may have contributed to this population increase. Pollen analysis suggests that humans impacted the local environment, especially the vegetation, for instance by using ferns for medicinal reasons. Deforestation in the area may also have been caused by humans.

=== Hunting and tool making ===
The structure of Tham Lod indicates an ambush hunting strategy by humans that once occupied the area. Ben Marwick's study of Tham Lod found at least 1722 stone artifacts. The number of finds indicates that the site served as a tool workshop. Materials used to make tools at the site included sandstone, quartzite, mudstone, andesite, siltstone, and slate; these tools included chopper-chopping tools, scrapers, sumatraliths (a typical artefact of the Hoabinhian), short-axes, disks, and flakes. Variations in these stone artifacts may indicate that some of them were acquired through trade.

=== Burials ===
The Tham Lod rockshelter contained four human burials. Two bodies were buried one above the other. The upper skeleton, of indeterminate sex, was found in an extended position 46 cm (18.1 in) below ground and dated to 12,100 +/- 60 years BP. It was buried with shellfish and land snails. The lower skeleton, a female, was found in a flexed position. It was about 152 cm (59.8 in) tall and dated to 13,640 +/- 80 years BP. She was buried with plants and flakes. Both of these skeletons had a hammer stone placed on top of them.

The other two skeletons were heavily disturbed, so that it is uncertain in what posture they were originally interred. One was a 9-13-year-old child and the other was a young man.

== Paleoenvironment ==
A study in 2006 conducted by Suwongpong Wattanapituksakul of Chulongcorn University found that animal life in the area remained the same between 35,000 and 10,000 BP. Suwongpong analyzed data from mammal teeth found in Tham Lod and identified 2003 specimens, which were then classified into 31 taxa. These animals included: Rhinocerotidae, Rhizomyidae, Rhizomys spp., Cannomys badius, Bandicota spp., and Bandicota indica. The presence of rhinocerotidae indicates that the environment was a dense forest up to 10,000 BP. δ18O data collected by Ben Marwick and Michael K. Gagan showed that from 35,000 to 20,000 BP the climate was wet and varied, then from 20,000 to 11,500 BP, it was dry; after 11,500 BP, the climate did not show variation but became more wet.

== See also ==
- Spirit Cave, Thailand
- Prehistoric Thailand
