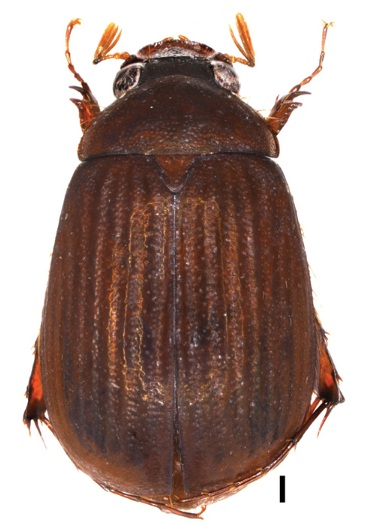

Scientific classification
- Kingdom: Animalia
- Phylum: Arthropoda
- Clade: Pancrustacea
- Class: Insecta
- Order: Coleoptera
- Suborder: Polyphaga
- Infraorder: Scarabaeiformia
- Family: Scarabaeidae
- Genus: Tetraserica
- Species: T. soppongana

Binomial name
- Tetraserica soppongana Fabrizi, Dalstein & Ahrens, 2019

= Tetraserica soppongana =

Species of beetle

Tetraserica soppongana is a species of beetle of the family Scarabaeidae. It is found in Thailand.

== Description ==
Adults reach a length of about 6.9 mm. The body is yellowish brown, while the head is dark and the antennae are yellow. The surface of the labroclypeus and the disc of the frons are glabrous. The smooth area anterior to the eye is twice as wide as long.

== Etymology ==
The species is named after the type locality, Sop Pong.
