= Na Pu Pom =

Na Pu Pom นาปู่ป้อม
- Tambon
- Interactive map of Na Pu Pom
- Coordinates: 19°32′12″N 98°06′40″E
- Country: Thailand
- Province: Mae Hong Son
- Amphoe: Pang Mapha

Population (2020)
  - Total: 4,806
- Time zone: UTC+7 (TST)
- Postal code: 58150
- TIS 1099: 580704

Na Pu Pom (Thai: นาปู่ป้อม) is a tambon (subdistrict) of Pang Mapha District, in Mae Hong Son Province, Thailand. In 2020 it had a total population of 4,806 people.

== History ==
The subdistrict was created effective August 10, 1989 by splitting off 7 administrative villages from Pang Mapha.

== Administration ==
=== Central administration ===
The tambon is subdivided into 12 administrative villages (muban).

No.	Name	Thai
1.	Ban Na Pu Pom	บ้านนาปู่ป้อม
2.	Ban Pang Tong	บ้านปางตอง
3.	Ban Pang Bon	บ้านปางบอน
4.	Ban Nam Upha Suea	บ้านน้ำฮูผาเสื่อ
5.	Ban Pung Yam	บ้านปุงยาม
6.	Ban Doi Khu	บ้านดอยคู
7.	Ban Thong Salae	บ้านโท้งสาแล
8.	Ban So Bae	บ้านซอแบะ
9.	Ban Thong Luang	บ้านโท้งหลวง
10.	Ban Thong Kong Tao	บ้านโท้งกองเต้า
11.	Ban Pa Lo	บ้านป่าโหล
12.	Ban Pang Khong	บ้านปางคอง

=== Local administration ===
The whole area of the subdistrict is covered by the subdistrict administrative organization (SAO) Na Pu Pom (องค์การบริหารส่วนตำบลนาปู่ป้อม).
