= Louis Malleret =

French archaeologist

Louis Malleret (1901–1970) was a French archaeologist. Malleret together with Paul Levy are credited with first reporting the archeological site An Son in Southern Vietnam.
