= An Sơn (archaeological site) =

Archaeological site in Southern Vietnam

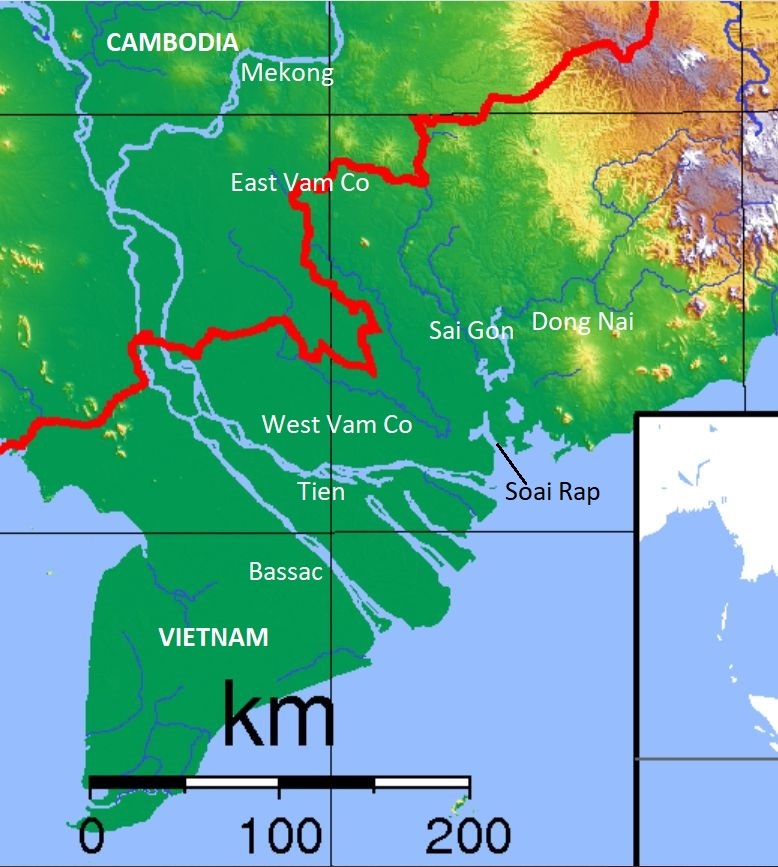
Vam Co Dong River (East Vam Co)

An Sơn is a mounded archaeological site located in the An Ninh Tay commune of the Đức Hòa district along the Vàm Cỏ Đông River in Long An province, Southern Vietnam. The site was originally discovered in 1938 by Louis Malleret and Paul Levy. Multiple excavations over a period of six decades have revealed that An Sơn was continuously occupied during the Neolithic period between approximately 2300-1200 B.C. During the excavations, archaeologists found many artifacts indicative of a Neolithic lifestyle similar to other Neolithic sites in Southern Vietnam and Thailand. Excavations have found pottery as well as ceramic productions. Furthermore, the burials found from excavations at An Sơn have gathered evidence of ritual ceremonies, an indication of the belief system of this area.

== Excavation history ==
There have been five major excavation projects since 1987 in An Sơn. The three most significant of these occurred in 1997, 2004, and 2009.

=== 1997 excavation ===
The 1997 excavation was carried out by Nishimura Masanari and Nguyen Kim Dung from the Center for Vietnamese and Inter-cultural studies at Hanoi National University in Hanoi, Vietnam. The primary focus of the excavation was to more precisely identify the chronology of the site using material remains found within four cultural layers within pit 1. The analysis of the artifacts led to the identification of four major cultural periods in An Sơn. In addition, they were able to more definitively date the time of occupation as the 2nd millennium B.C., in the Neolithic Period.

=== 2004 excavation ===
The 2004 excavation proved to be most helpful in identifying human burials in An Sơn. Archaeologists dug multiple trenches in the eastern side of the site and were able to locate 20 individuals. Carbon-dating the charcoal and tooth enamel found in the burials further helped establish the continuous occupation of the site. The An Sơn burials constitute a Neolithic population that expressed a mixture of both indigenous Hoabinhian and Neolithic southern Chinese DNA markers.

=== 2009 excavation ===
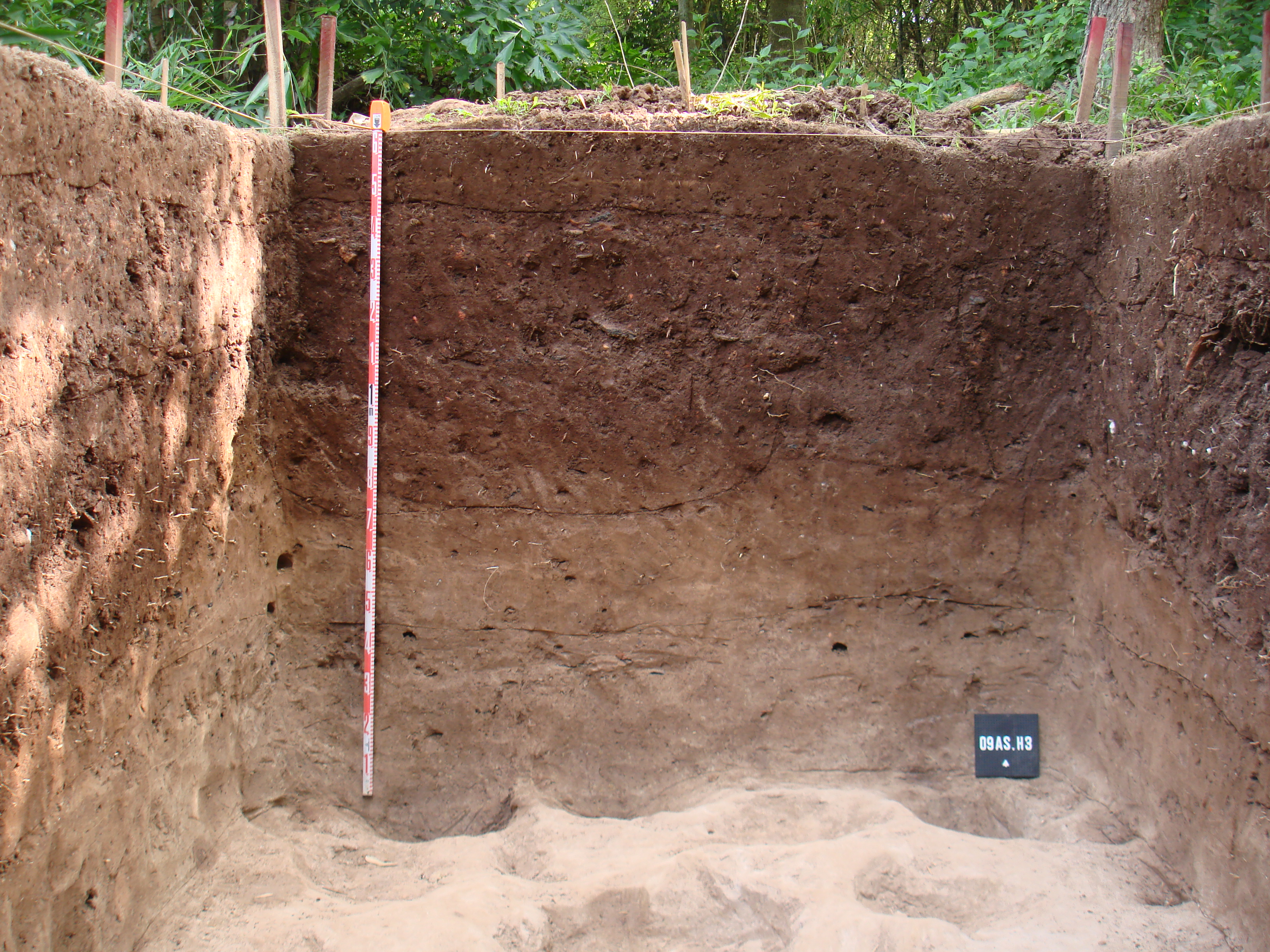
Excavation trench (2009)

The 2009 excavation yielded an abundance of artifacts illuminating different cultural aspects of An Sơn. Specifically, animal bones and plant remains provide evidence for the subsistence economy that existed during the period of occupation. In addition, excavation of ceramic remains, specifically pottery, provided information not only on the cultural substance of the population, but also led to predictions of intra- and inter-regional relations and origins of the population.

== Material culture ==
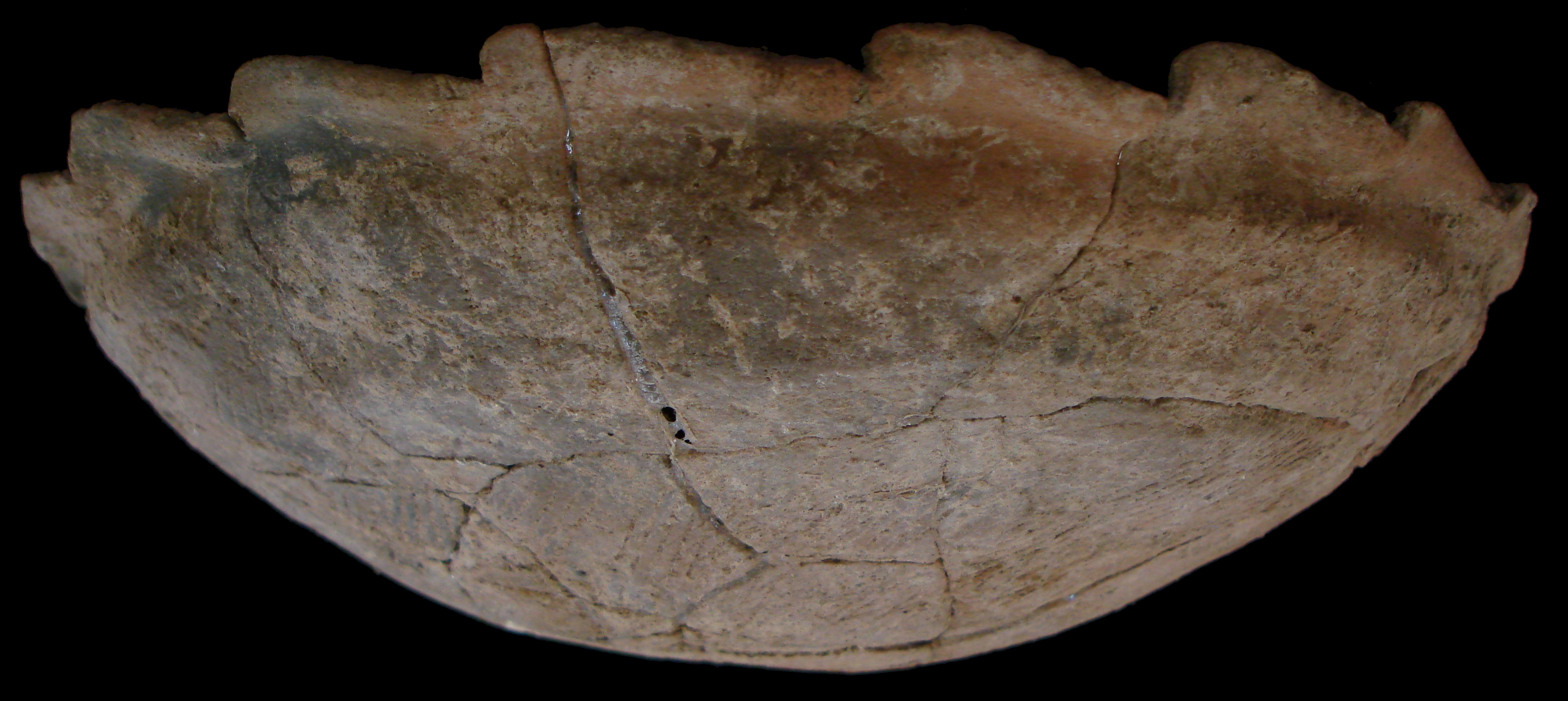
Wavy rimmed vessel at An Sơn

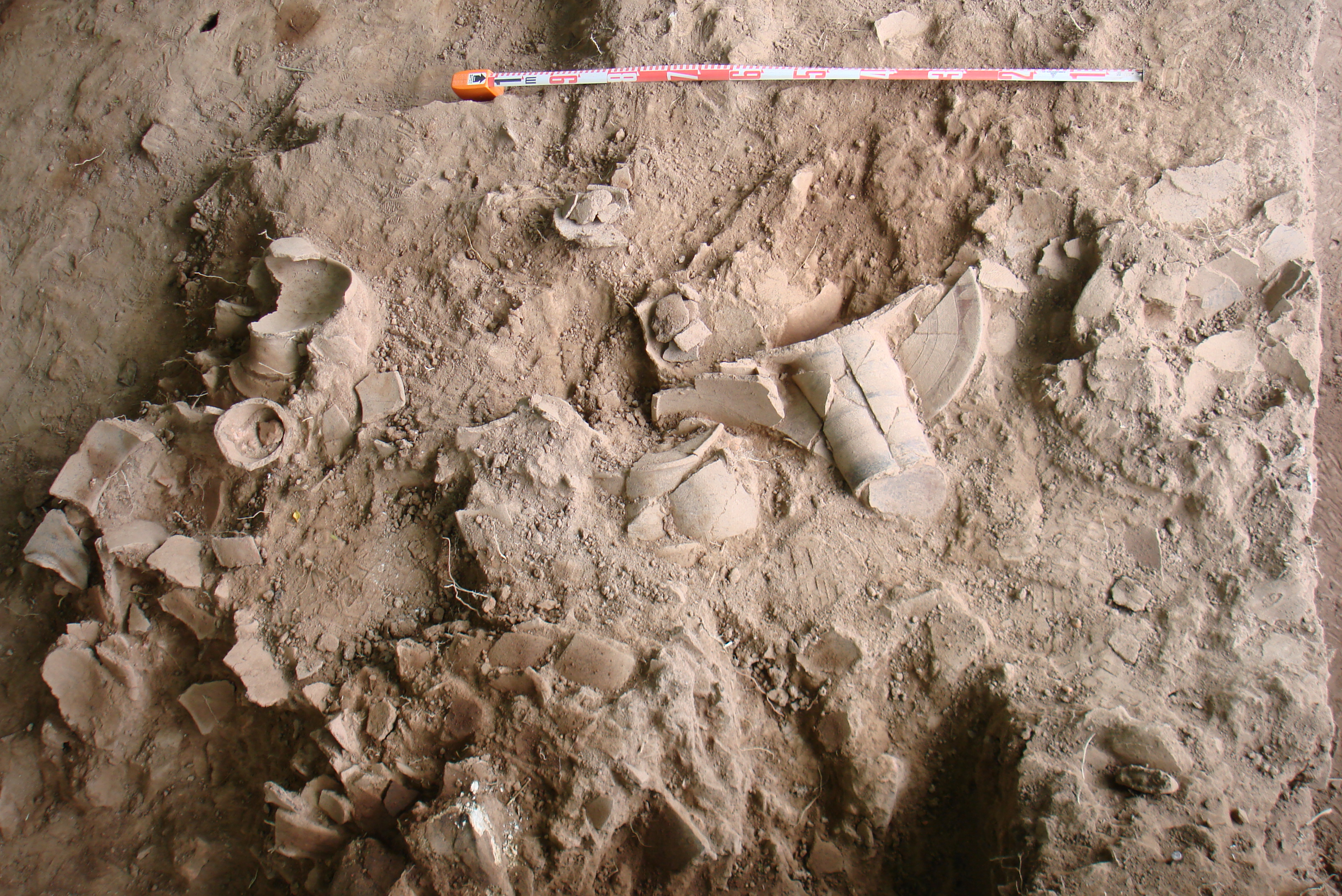
Ceramics found in excavation unit at An Sơn

Archaeologists were able to study the site of An Sơn due to material artifacts that indicated a timeline in which a civilization existed. Excavations found stone adzes, which are axe-like Neolithic tools made out of stone used for cutting material or food sources, giving archaeologists a better understanding of the time period and the technological advancements at An Sơn.

Another common artifact found at An Sơn is pottery remains. Pottery at the site was decorated with intricate patterns, showcasing their makers' skill. Pottery was often used for cooking, storing, or serving food. While the use for pottery typically remained the same, the designs over the course of time improved and became more intricate. In the 1997 excavation, Nishimura Masanari and Nguyen Kim Dung found pottery that had different decorations, indicating development of new techniques and tools resulting in more intricate designs over a period of time. In the 2009 excavation, archaeologists expected to find more pottery vessel remains but instead found tools for puncturing and incising the pottery.

== Subsistence economy ==
The subsistence economy in An Sơn was characterized primarily by dog and pig husbandry. In addition to evidence for rice cultivation, the majority of the evidence for subsistence economy came from the excavation in 2009, when archaeologists used biometric and age profiling analysis of 8610 animal bones found within the different layers of a trench. Within this trench the majority of bones uncovered were those of dog and pig.

=== Animal remains ===
Domestic dog (canis) bones were found in all layers of the trench, indicating that dogs were domesticated and a prominent aspect of the society's diet since its initial occupation around 2100 B.C. This marks one of the earliest indicators of dog domestication in Southern Vietnam. The cut marks found on the bones, and lack of remains found in burials indicate that while the dogs were domesticated they were most likely bred to be butchered and eaten rather than for companionship.

The earliest pig (suid) remains were also found in the earliest layer of the trench, dating to around 2100 B.C. However unlike the dog remains, analysis of the pig remains was inconclusive on whether they were domesticated or wild boar. However, by around 1800 B.C., the age of the pigs at death were around 2–3 years, consistent with that of a population of domestic pigs. This evidence suggests that slaughter of domestic pigs was more common by this time than wild boar hunting, and for the majority of its occupation, the population at An Sơn was engaged in pig husbandry, most likely with the help of containment crates.

While pig and dog bones were the most dominant in the make up of bones found in An Sơn, there was also evidence for wild animal hunting including other terrestrial mammals, reptiles, and fish.

== Origins and interactions with other regions ==
An Sơn is located in the southeastern part of Vietnam, close to other civilizations in Vietnam and Cambodia. Due to the proximity of An Sơn to other sites, research provided insight into relations and interactions with other regions, helping understand certain behaviors or cultural styles that civilizations exchanged. From material culture, archaeologists have been able to determine a correspondence between An Sơn and two other early Neolithic sites, Bau Too and Nong Nor. Nong Nor's ceramic vessels suggest strong similarities to the vessels found at An Sơn. They shared many characteristics, although artifacts at An Sơn were rare.

Another piece of evidence that hints at cultural exchange is the use of roulette stamping on vessels at An Sơn. Roulette stamping is a decorative technique used frequently on ceramic vessels. Although An Sơn's material culture shows ceramics were often incised and impressed which is common throughout Southeast Asia, roulette stamping shows potential communication with other cultures or civilizations. Widespread Neolithic culture in Southern Vietnam led to innovation across civilizations shortly after settlement at sites.

Archaeologists have found some of the best evidence for subsistence strategies at An Sơn. The site is home to some of the earliest sedentary agriculturists in southern Vietnam. Excavations that have resulted in proof of agricultural sites have been used to determine the timing and dates of the introduction of domesticating animals in other areas in Vietnam. Archaeologists have been able to determine the interactions between the site of An Sơn and other sites around mainland Southeast Asia. For example, the substance strategy differs from those found in Northeastern Thailand, however the ceramics found at the An Sơn site shows similarities to Thailand ceramic techniques. The similarities and differences An Sơn had to areas in and around Vietnam show the interaction with other civilizations.

== Significance of the site ==
An Sơn is one of the most extensively excavated sites in Southern Vietnam that provides evidence of a Neolithic sequence. Excavations occurred over the course of a decade that increased knowledge of the people of An Sơn, while also permitting comparison of its Neolithic culture to other regions and the timeline of other civilizations.

One of the important discoveries in the site was the discovery of domestic dog bones in the earliest layers. Currently there is no earlier evidence of domestic dogs in the Hoabinhian culture in southern Vietnam. Therefore, evidence of domestic dog bones in the early layers of the site of An Sơn during the early Neolithic period indicate that domestic dogs were most likely introduced to the area by the earliest agriculturalists in the region.

In addition, An Sơn exemplifies the rapid adaptation and local innovation of Neolithic culture in Southern Vietnam. The introduction of Neolithic type ceramics, advanced rice cultivation, and the domestication of animals were all found very early in the layers of the site. This indicates that all of these adaptations co-occurred. In addition, this site also demonstrates regionalization and innovation of Neolithic culture at the local level.

Finally, An Sơn is also significant in terms of its place in the cultural heritage of Southern Vietnam. This site provides one of the earliest evidence demonstrating a well developed culture in Southern Vietnam. While this site was only occupied for a short period of time, the material culture demonstrates both a strong tie to other regions as well as indigenous identity. The clear importance of this site is demonstrated by the interest from the Center for Vietnamese and Inter-cultural Studies in Hanoi, Vietnam. The Center funded and led the excavation in 1997.
