= Phùng Nguyên culture =

Pre-historic culture of Vietnam

The Phùng Nguyên culture of Vietnam (c. 2,000 – 1,500 BC) is a name given to a culture of the Bronze Age in Vietnam which takes its name from an archeological site in Phùng Nguyên, 18 km (11 mi) east of Việt Trì discovered in 1958. It was during this period that rice cultivation was introduced into the Red River region by northern Dai people. The first Phùng Nguyên culture excavation was in 1959, known as Co Nhue. The sites of Phùng Nguyên culture are usually several meters higher than the surrounding terrain and near rivers or streams. The most typical artifacts are pediform adzes of polished stone.

== Gallery ==
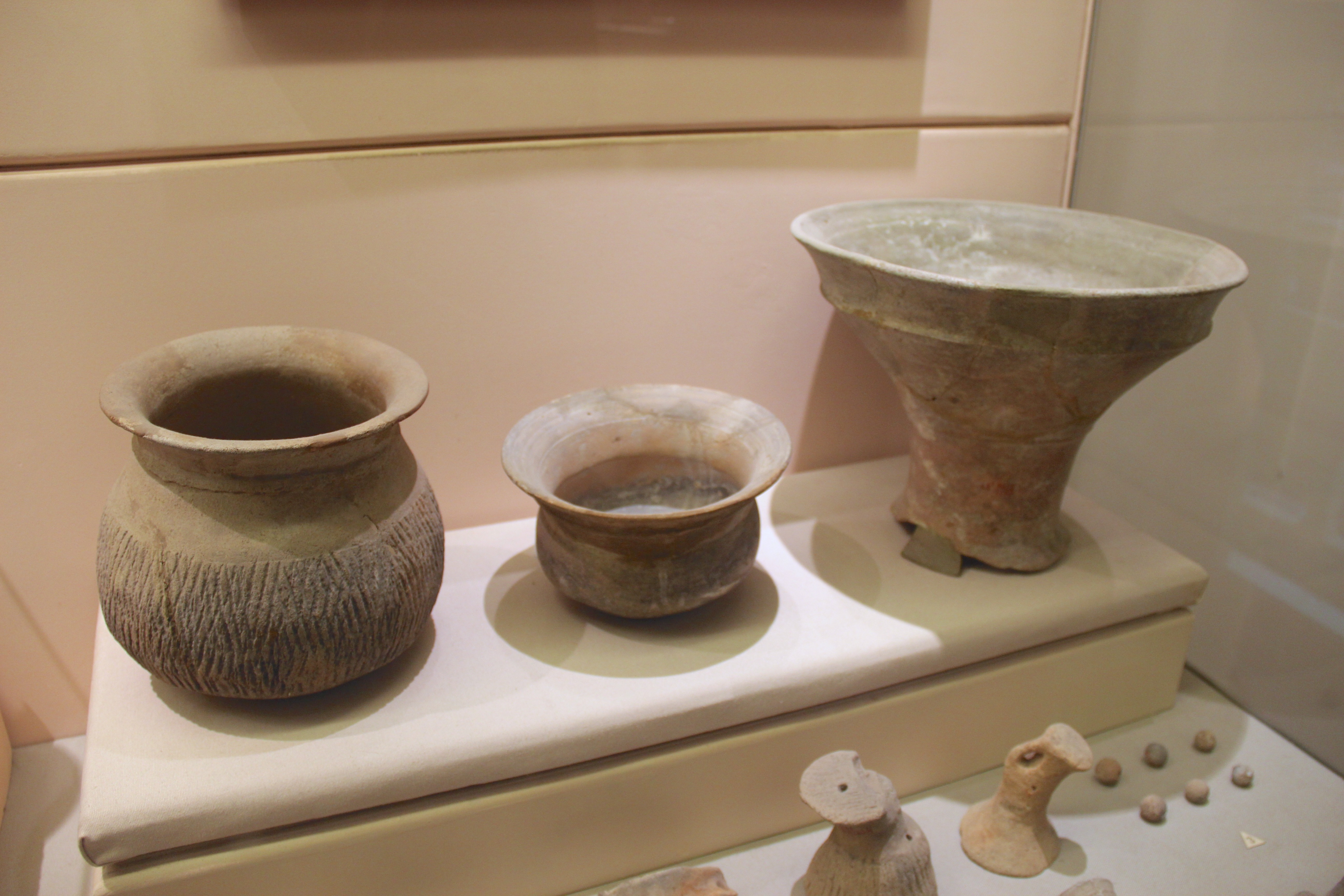
Phùng Nguyên culture pots

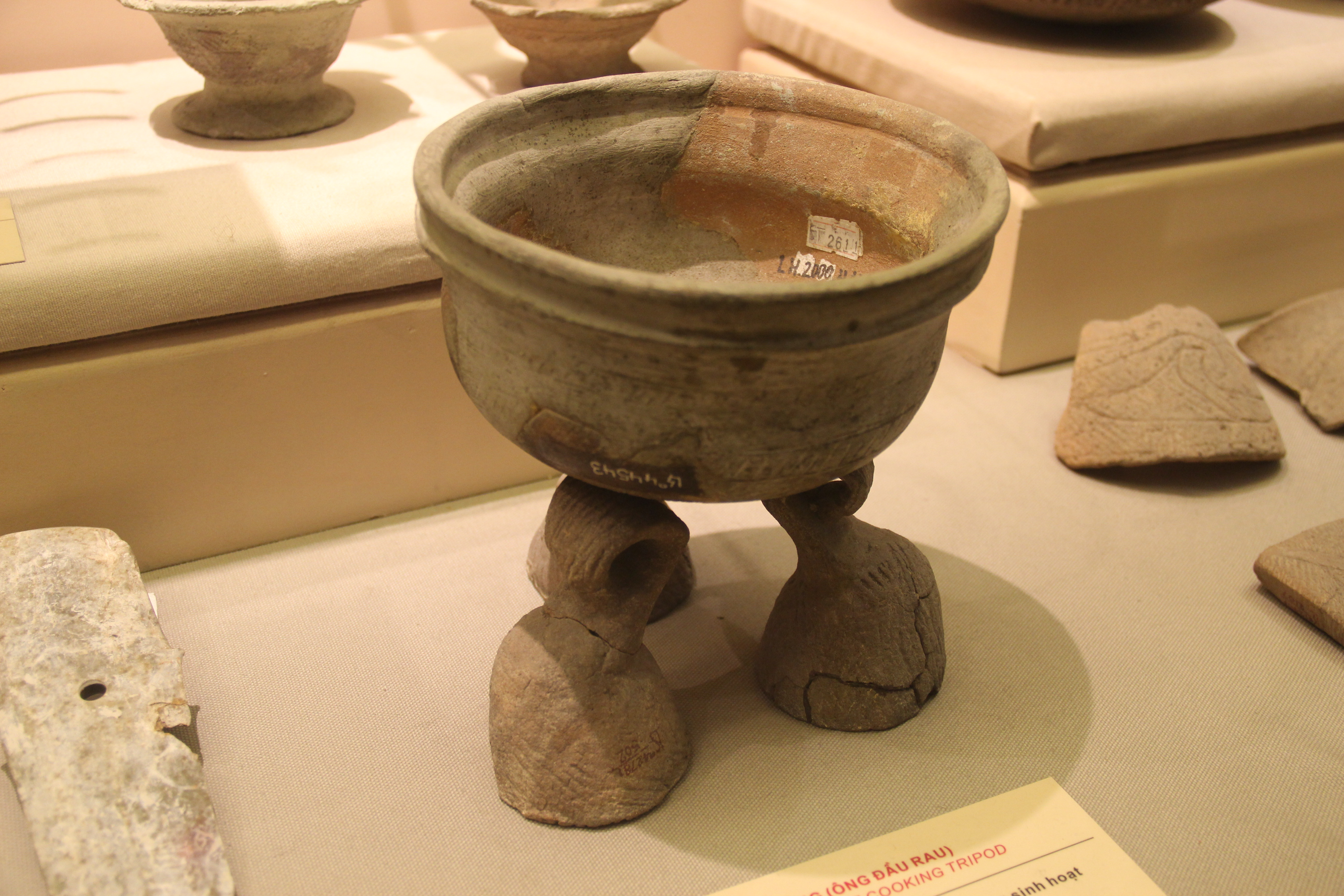
Phùng Nguyên culture tripod pot

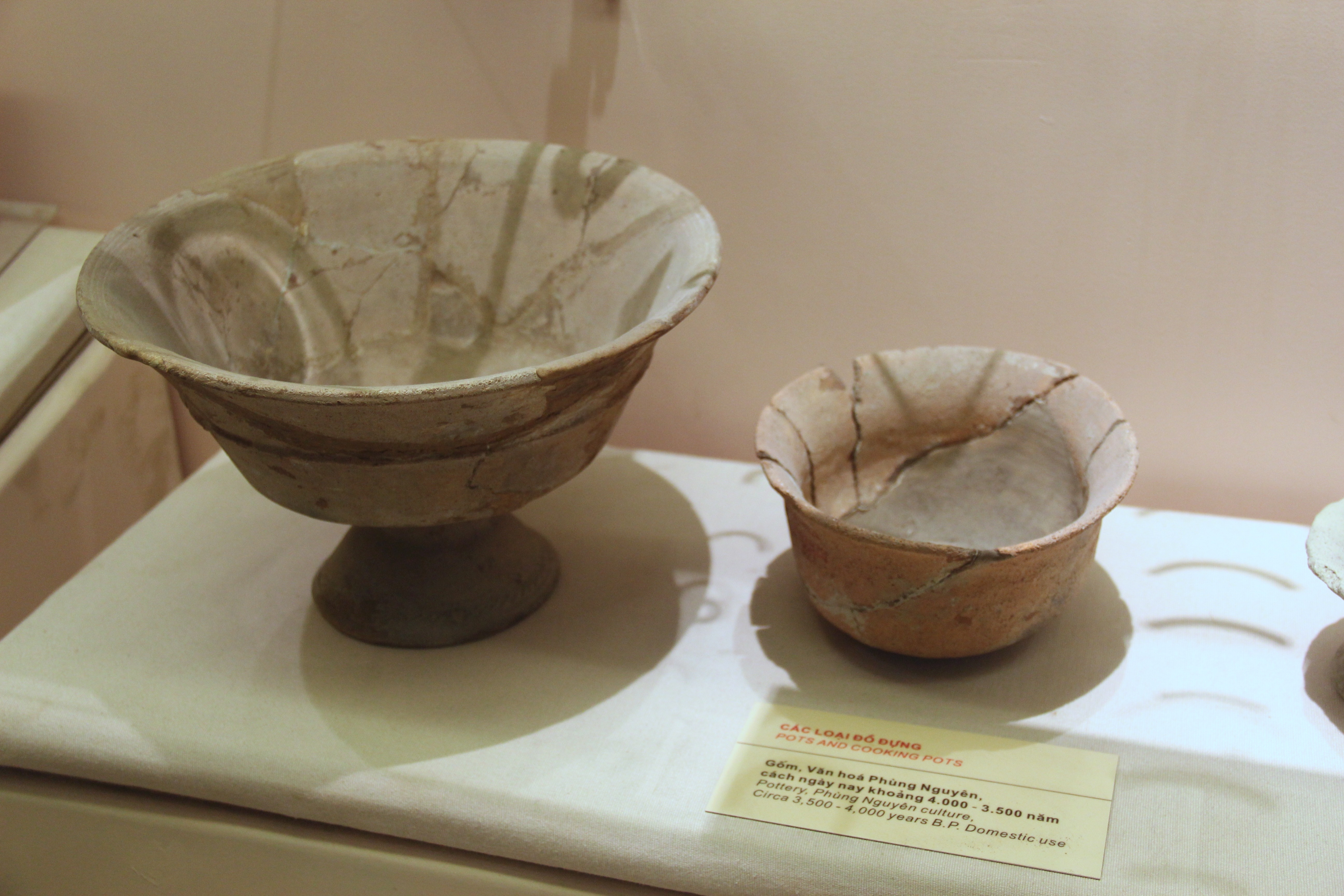
Phùng Nguyên culture pots, 3,500-4,000 years B.P.

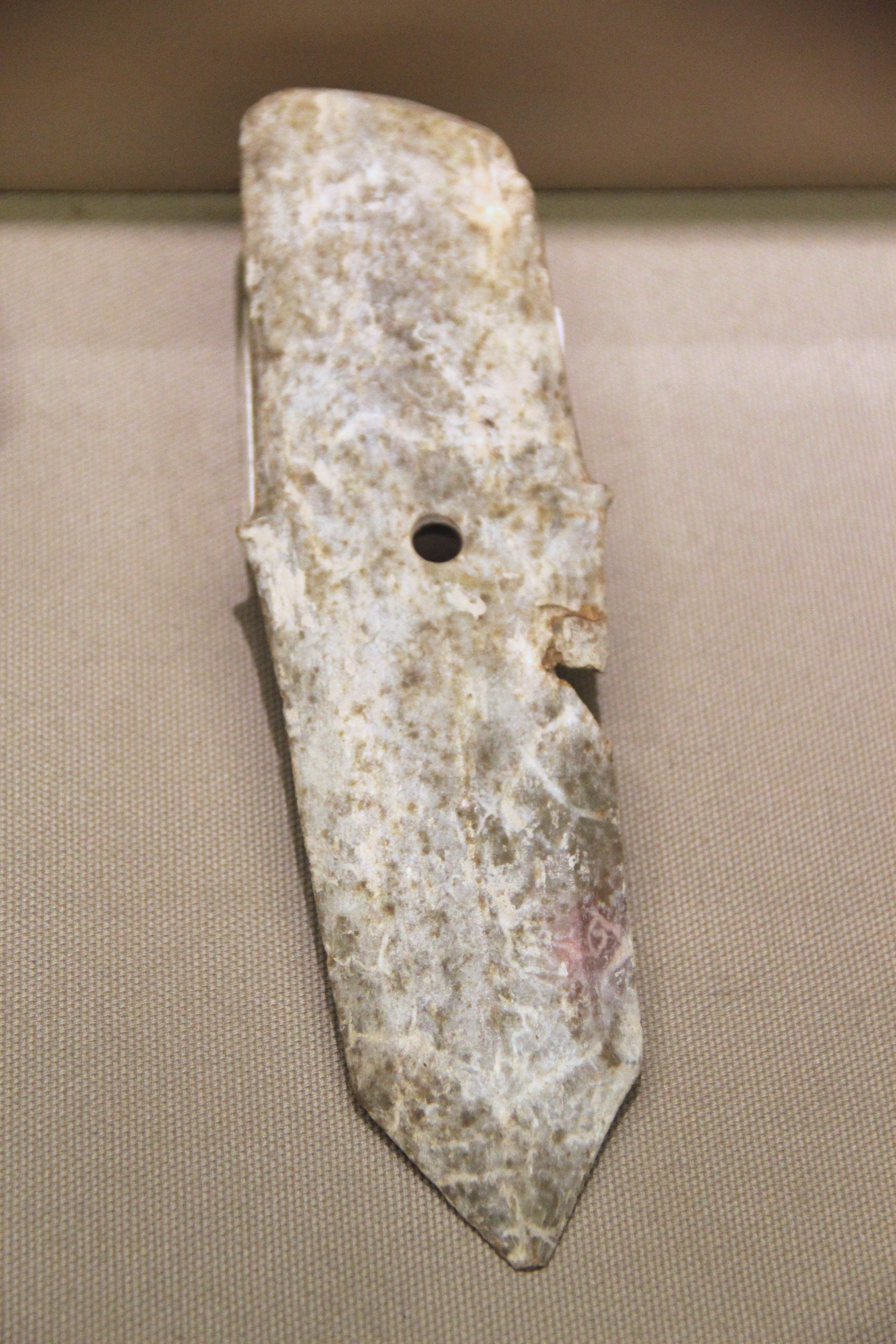
Phùng Nguyên stone spear

== See also ==
- Mán Bạc
