= Pang Mapha district =

Pang Mapha ปางมะผ้า
- District
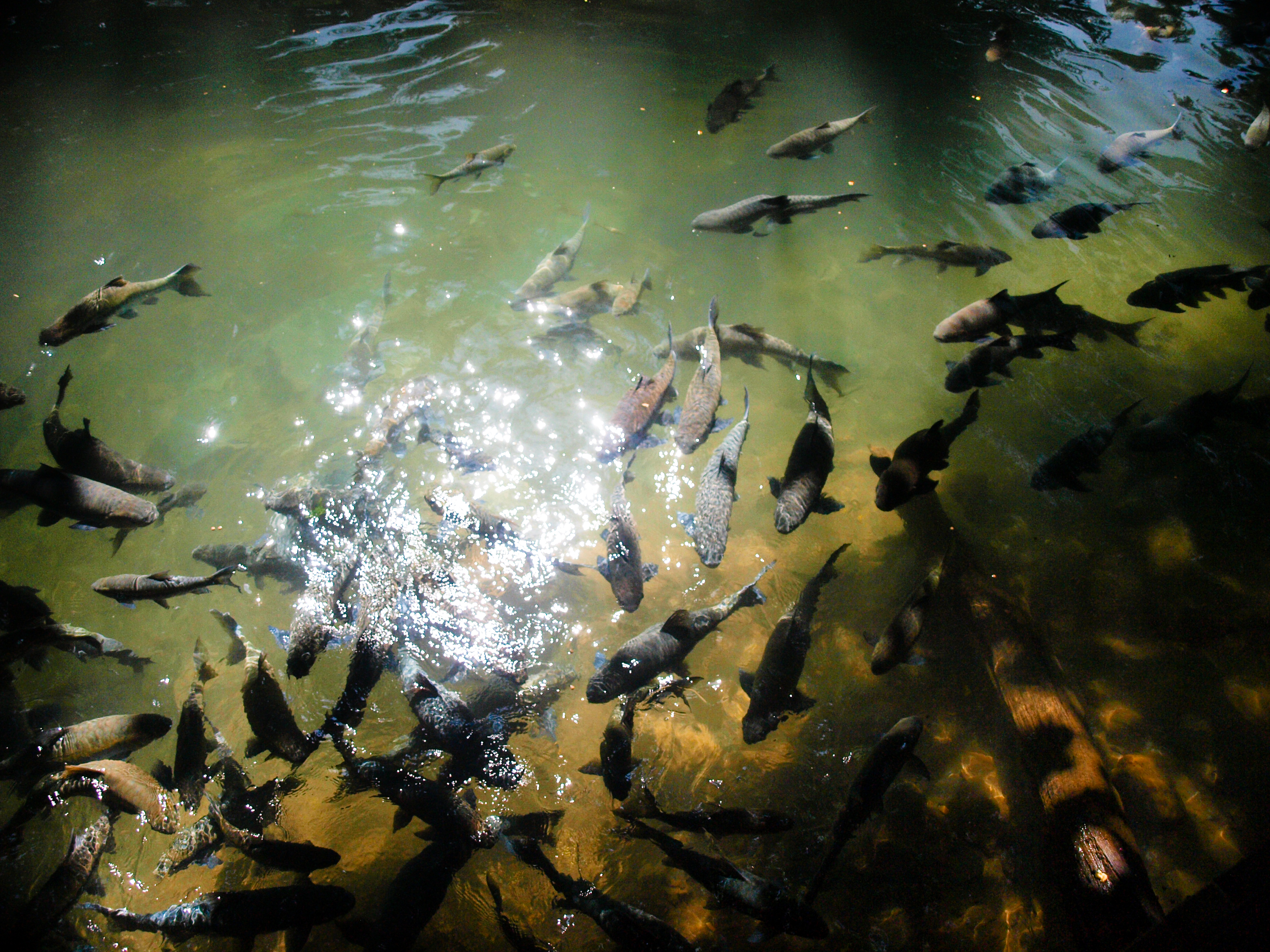
- School of rock mahseer at Tham Pla–Namtok Pha Suea National Park, Pang Mapha

- District location in Mae Hong Son province
- Coordinates: 19°31′21″N 98°14′46″E
- Country: Thailand
- Province: Mae Hong Son
- Seat: Sop Pong

Area
  - Total: 798.375 km^{2} (308.254 sq mi)

Population (2005)
  - Total: 19,708
  - Density: 24.7/km^{2} (64/sq mi)
- Time zone: UTC+7 (ICT)
- Postal code: 58150
- Geocode: 5807

Pang Mapha (Thai: ปางมะผ้า, pronounced [pāːŋ mā.pʰâː]; Northern Thai: ᨸᩣ᩠ᨦᨾᨹ᩶ᩣ, pronounced [pǎːŋ mā.pʰa᷇ː]) is the northernmost district (amphoe) of Mae Hong Son province, northern Thailand.

== Etymology ==
In the Shan language, mapha or makpha (มะผ้า or หมากผ้า) means 'lime' and pang means 'hill', so a rough translation into English might be 'lime hill'.

== History ==
Several prehistoric sites are known within the Pang Mapha area. The most famous one is the Spirit Cave, discovered by Chester Gorman in the mid-1960s, was occupied from about 9000 till 5500 BCE by Hoabinhian hunters and gatherers. Two other significant sites nearby are the Banyan Valley Cave and the Steep Cliff Cave. Much more recent are the coffin caves like Tham Lot.

During World War II Japanese troops built a road from Pai to Mueang Mae Hong Son and further to Burma. Later people used the road for transport, using Ban Soppong Mae Umong (บ้านสบป่องแม่อูมอง) as the overnight stop. The government built a police station in 1948 in the area called Pang Mapha. In 1977 the government improved the road, many people from other districts and provinces, hill tribes and refugees from Myanmar moved to the area. This created problems like drug trafficking and deforestation. To improve the administration of the area, the government created the Pang Mapha minor district (king amphoe) on 1 April 1987, by splitting the two tambons Sop Pong and Pang Mapha from Mueang Mae Hong Son district. It was upgraded to a full district on 5 December 1996.

== Geography ==
The Daen Lao Range dominates the landscape of this district. Neighboring districts are (from southeast clockwise): Pai, Mueang Mae Hong Son of Mae Hong Son Province and Shan State of Myanmar.

The main river of the district is the Khong River.

Tham Lot cave is in Tham Lot District.

== Administration ==
The district is divided into four sub-districts (tambons), which are further subdivided into 38 villages (mubans). There are no municipal (thesaban) areas. There are four tambon administrative organizations (TAO).

| No. | Name | Thai name | Villages | Pop. |
|---|---|---|---|---|
| 1. | Sop Pong | สบป่อง | 8 | 7,398 |
| 2. | Pang Mapha | ปางมะผ้า | 11 | 4,017 |
| 3. | Tham Lot | ถ้ำลอด | 7 | 3,784 |
| 4. | Na Pu Pom | นาปู่ป้อม | 12 | 4,509 |
