= Tham Lot cave =

Cave in Mae Hong Son province, Thailand

Coordinates: 19°34′19″N 98°16′38″E

Tham Lot Cave exit during the dry season

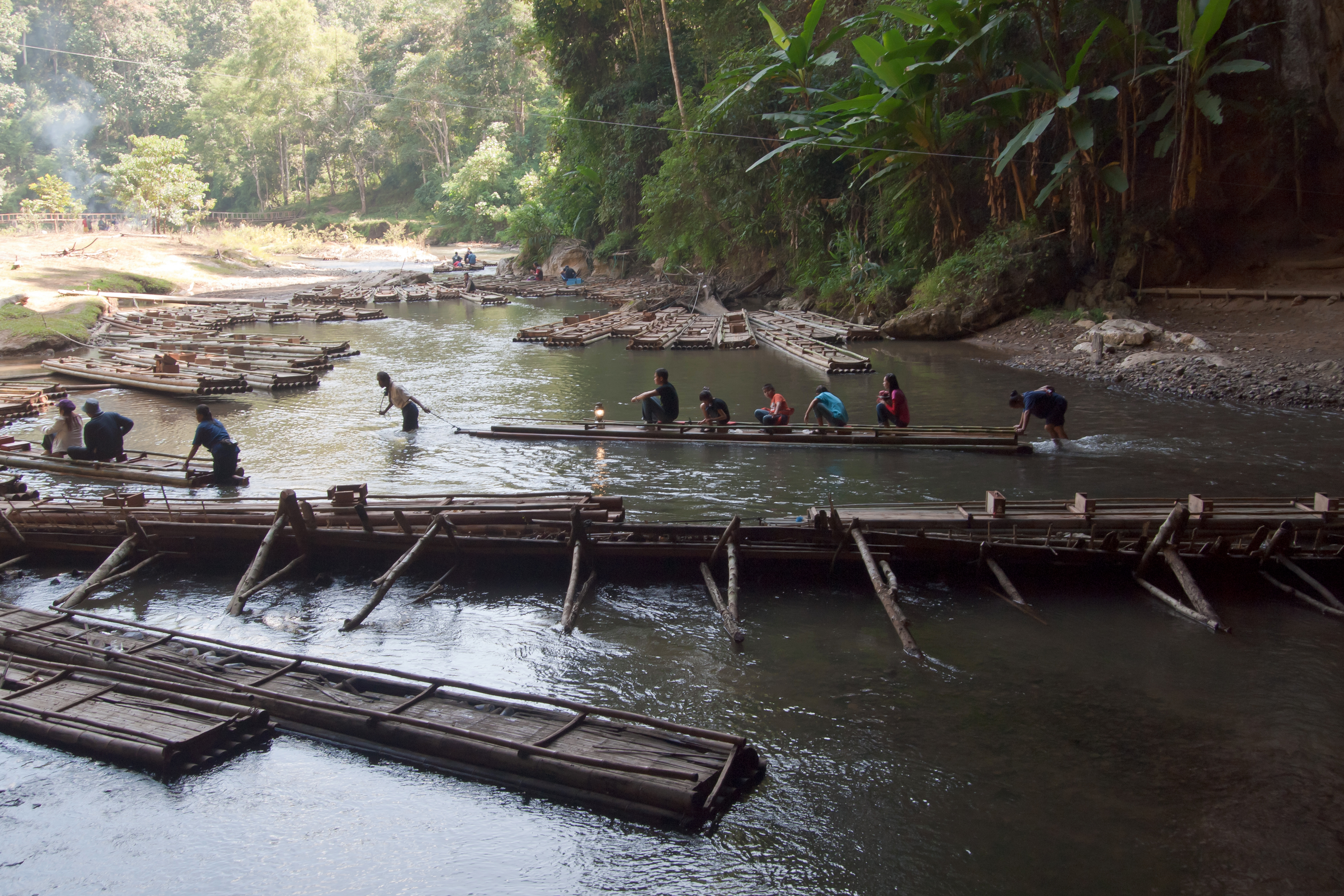
Bamboo rafts in Tham Lot Cave

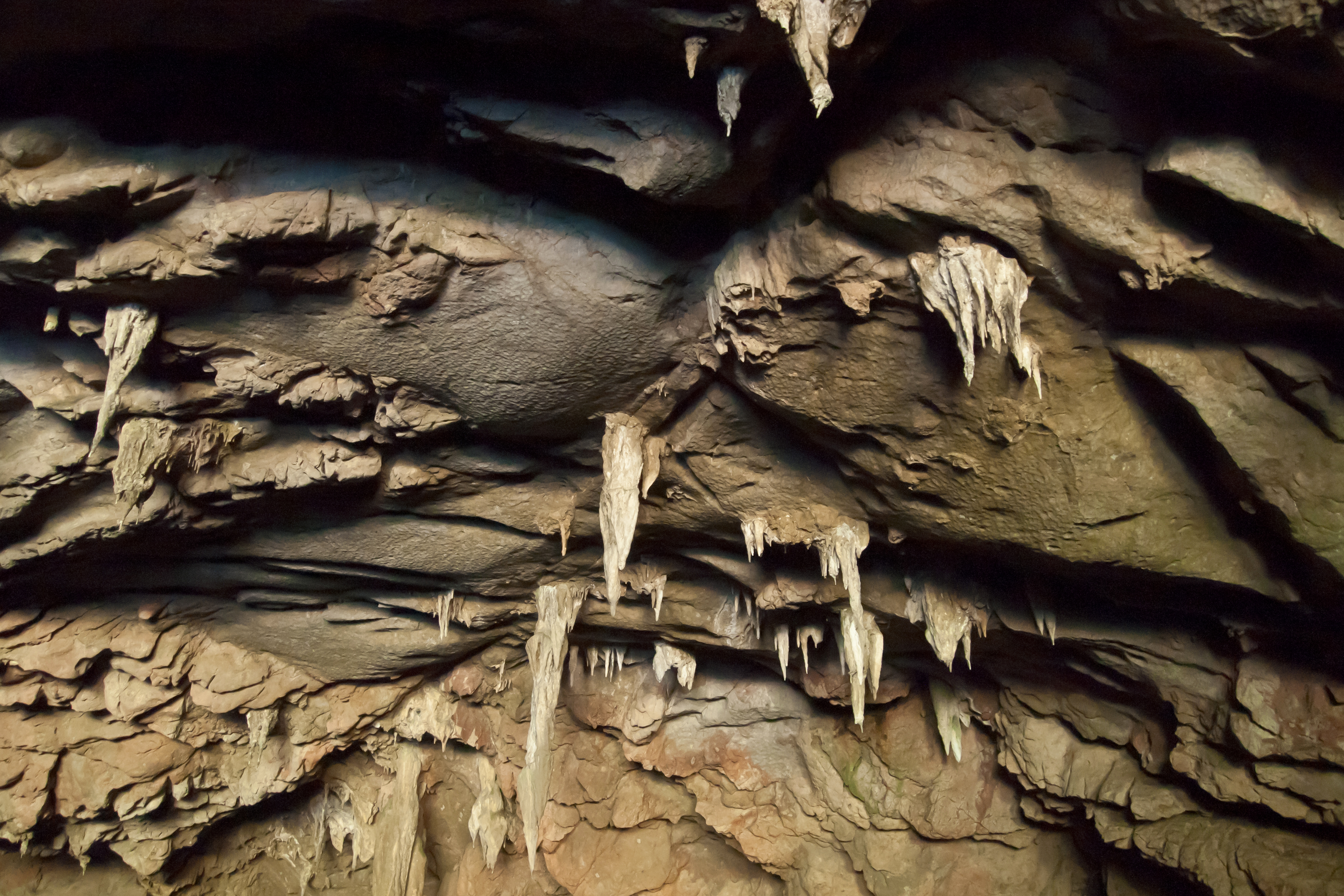
Stalactites in Tham Lot

Tham Lot cave (Thai: ถ้ำลอด) is a cave system with a length of 1,666 meters near Sop Pong in Pang Mapha District, Mae Hong Son Province, northern Thailand. The Nam Lang River flows through the cave which is filled with stalactites, stalagmites, columns, and flowstone. The cave is a karst cave set in Permian age limestone. The cave has a large population of bats and Himalayan swiftlets. In Tham Lot and other caves nearby teakwood coffins have been discovered which are thought to have been carved by the Lawa tribes people thousands of years ago.

Another cave in the area, the second longest known cave in Thailand, is Tham Mae Lana, which is 12 kilometres long. This was explored by Australian expeditions between 1984 and 1986. Other caves in the area which are over one kilometre long include Tham Nam Lang (8,550 m), Tham Bung Hu (4,442 m), Tham Pha Mon (4,050 m), Tham Seua/Tham Lom (3,100 m), Tham Susa (2,617 m), Tham Huai Kun (1,747 m), Tham Pang Kham (1,370 m) and Tham Plah (1,365 m). Spirit Well (Nam Bua Phi), a large collapsed sinkhole, one of the largest known natural holes in Thailand, is south of the Hwy 1095. It is more than 200 m across and 90 to 130 m deep. It was first descended, by Australians, in 1985.

== See also ==
- List of caves
- Speleology
