= Spit (archaeology) =

In the field of archaeology, a spit is a unit of archaeological excavation with an arbitrarily assigned measurement of depth and extent. It is a method of excavation employed without regard to the archaeological stratigraphy that may (or may not) be identifiable at the archaeological site under investigation. The method of excavating in arbitrary spits is most frequently encountered at site excavations which lack any visible or reconstructable stratigraphy in the archaeological context, or when excavating through intrusive or fill deposits.

== Terminology origins ==
Spit is an old English word that archaeologists continue to use. It means an arbitrary or artificial level (the latter expression is preferred by American archaeologists). Today archaeologists rarely dig in spits, except as vertical subdivisions of natural layers that are not naturally subdivided.

== Excavational use ==
The excavation of sites in arbitrary levels was a product of archaeologists excavating for interesting things and structures rather than trying to reveal the strata of an archaeological site in the order they were laid down. As Sir Mortimer Wheeler put it:

[T]he methodical digging for systematic information not with the upturning of earth in a hunt for bones of saints and giants or the armoury of heroes, or just plainly for treasure.

Wheeler was a strong advocate for the use of stratigraphy and was very critical of the use of spits, noting that "a modern" (i.e. 1950) Manual of Field Archaeological Methods prepared by a leading American University advocated this method. Apparently an archaeological site was to be excavated using arbitrary levels and then the stratigraphy was drawn in the exposed sections and the two were to be correlated in some way.

Australian archaeologist John Clegg comments "Prehistoric archaeologists at Cambridge in the 1950s were taught to dig in spits if:

- there was no section available to dig from, or
- the stratigraphic layer was too thick, so better split it into spits or
- the student-workers were beginners.

The theoretical point was that no one can be certain of strata by just digging down with no visible/tangible changes; the first trench should always be in spits, until sections are visible (comment posted to the Ausarch discussion list May 2008).

The use of arbitrary levels and Wheeler's critique is discussed by American archaeologists Hester et al., where they emphasise that the technique is only justified where there is no visible stratigraphy. Another influential textbook, Hole and Heizer's An Introduction to Prehistoric Archaeology, does not overtly condemned spit excavation. Prominent Mesoamerican archaeologist Kent V. Flannery (writing in the early 1970s) refers to the practice in the context of Mesoamerican archaeology, and illustrates its problems; the technique continues to find its practitioners.

== See also ==
- Archaeological association
- Archaeological context
- Archaeological field survey
- Archaeological plan
- Archaeological section
- Cut (archaeology)
- Feature (archaeology)
- Fill (archaeology)
- Harris matrix
- Relationship (archaeology)
- Single context recording
