= Spirit Cave (Thailand) =

Cave and archaeological site in Thailand

Coordinates: 19°34′04″N 98°16′52″E

- ถ้ำผีแมน (Thai)
- Tham Phi Maen
- Location in Thailand
- Periods: Upper Paleolithic, Neolithic
- Cultures: Hoabinhian
- Location: Pang Mapha district, Mae Hong Son Province, Thailand

Site notes
- Elevation: 650 m (2,130 ft)
- Archaeologists: Chester Gorman

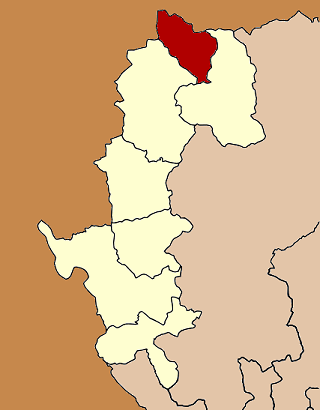
Mae Hong Son Province, Pang Mapha district in red

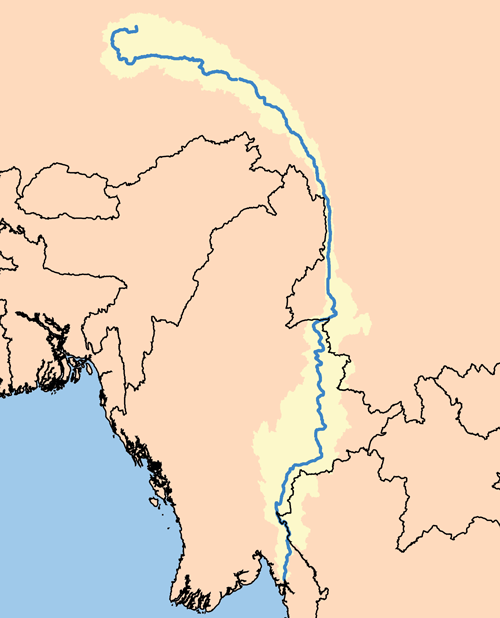
Map of the Salween watershed

Spirit Cave (Thai: ถ้ำผีแมน, Tham Phii Man) is an archaeological site in Pang Mapha district, Mae Hong Son Province, northwestern Thailand. It was occupied for four brief periods between 12,000 to 7,000 uncalibrated radiocarbon years ago by prehistoric humans of the Hoabinhian culture. The site was once presented as evidence for the early development of agriculture, but this is now deprecated.

== Location and description ==
The site is situated at an elevation of 650 m (2,130 ft) above sea level on a hillside overlooking a small stream. It was excavated in the mid-1960s by Chester Gorman. The Salween River, one of Southeast Asia's longest rivers, flows less than 50 km (31 mi) to the north. Two other significant nearby sites are the Banyan Valley Cave and the Steep Cliff Cave.

Human presence at the site is documented from the Upper Paleolithic to the early Neolithic, but the primary occupation layers represent Hoabinhian hunter-gatherers. The archaeological deposit is very thin, measuring only 75 cm in depth. This contains four separate layers, relating to five different periods of occupation. Layer 2 is subdivided into two parts, of which the upper part (layer 2a) is the more recent. Layer 1, the most recent layer, contained pottery sherds, three stone adzes, and two small slate knives, which do not appear in lower levels and thus indicate a major change in the material culture.

== Chronology ==
Gorman dated layers 2-4 between 11,000 and 5,500 BCE through radiocarbon dating of samples of charcoal.

Radiocarbon dating of organic resin on some pottery sherds from layer 1 (the most recent layer) by Lampert et al. indicate a date ca. 1400 BCE, which they claimed should be applied to the site as a whole.

Subsequent radiocarbon dating of four freshwater crab (Indochinamon sp.) dactyls from layers 1, 2, 2a and 4 showed that they date between ca. 7850-6500 BCE, which is consistent with Gorman's claims of occupation during the Pleistocene–Holocene transition. However, the age of the dactyls was the reverse of the stratigraphic sequence (i.e. the oldest dactyl derived from the most recent layer and vice versa). This may be due to mixing of the layers in prehistoric times or errors in the provenance information of the dactyls.

== Animal remains ==
Gorman passed the material from the site through a fine mesh screen, leading to the discovery of small animal bones for the first time from a prehistoric site in Thailand. The resulting finds provide evidence for the animals caught and eaten by the inhabitants of the cave. All layers contain remains of sambar deer. Some layers contain bones of pigs, small deer, monkeys (langur, macaque, gibbon), squirrels, palm civets, martens, otters, jungle cats, and badgers.

== Plant domestication ==
Gorman claims that the Spirit Cave included remains of Prunus (almond), Terminalia, Areca (betel), Vicia (broadbean) or Phaseolus, Pisum (pea) or Raphia lagenaria (bottle gourd), Trapa (Chinese water chestnut), Piper (pepper), Madhuca (butternut), Canarium, Aleurites (candle nut), and Cucumis (a cucumber type) in layers dating to around 9,800 to 8,500 years BCE. None of the recovered specimens differed from their wild phenotypes. He suggested that these may have been used as foods, condiments, stimulants, for lighting and that the leguminous plants in particular "point to a very early use of domesticated plants". He later wrote that "Whether they are definitely early cultigens remains to be established... What is important, and what we can say definitely, is that the remains indicate the early, quite sophisticated use of particular species which are still culturally important in Southeast Asia".

In 1972 W.G. Solheim, as the director of the project of which Spirit Cave was part, published an article in Scientific American discussing the finds from Spirit Cave. While Solheim noted that the specimens may "merely be wild species gathered from the surrounding countryside", he claimed that the inhabitants at Spirit Cave had "an advanced knowledge of horticulture". Solheim's chronological chart suggests that "incipient agriculture" began about 20,000 years BCE in Southeast Asia. He also suggests that ceramic technology was invented at 13,000 years BCE although Spirit Cave does not have ceramics evident until after 6,800 years BCE. This conclusion was widely repeated in academic textbooks.

Solheim himself admitted that his reconstruction is "largely hypothetical." Higham and Thosarat conclude that there are "no grounds" for linking the site with agriculture. Elsewhere, Higham states that these claims have detracted from the significance of Spirit Cave as a site with well-preserved evidence of human subsistence and palaeoenvironmental conditions during the Hoabinhian.

== Lithics ==
Gorman discussed cultural levels with respect to lithic artifacts and identified two layers at Spirit Cave. Course-grained quartzite was the most abundant stone found in both layers. The remains included large unifacially worked pebble cores aka sumatraliths, grinding stones, and retouched/utilized flakes. Cultural level two consisted of new types of artifacts including flaked and polished quadrangular adzes and small ground/polished slate knives. He used the findings at Spirit Cave to argue the notion that the Hoabinhian culture was a techno-complex due to a response to similar ecological adaptations.

== See also ==
- List of caves
- Speleology

== Sources ==
- Higham, Charles (2002). Early Cultures of Mainland Southeast Asia. River Books. pp. 46–49.
- Higham, Charles; Thosarat, Rachanie (2012). Early Thailand: from prehistory to Sukhothai (1. ed.). Bangkok: River Books. ISBN 978-9749863916.
