= Con Moong Cave =

Cave and archaeological site in Vietnam

- Location within Vietnam
- Location: Thành Yên commune, Thạch Thành District, Thanh Hóa Province
- Coordinates: 20°17′15″N 105°36′18″E
- Depth: 8.5 m
- Length: 30 to 40 m
- Elevation: 40 m
- Discovery: 1974
- Geology: limestone
- Entrances: 1

The Con Moong cave (Vietnamese: Hang Con Moong, "beast" cave) is located in the Cúc Phương National Park, just south of Mọ village, in the Thanh Hóa Province, northern Vietnam. The Department of Culture has issued a certificate that declares Con Moong prehistoric site and its surroundings as National Relics and is managed by the Cúc Phương National Park administration, along with a refuge for rare animals. Among these locations, the archaeological site of Con Moong cave is of central importance for the study of the Mesolithic Hoabinhian culture. In April and May 1976, Vietnamese archaeologists excavated the site.

== World Heritage status ==
This site was added to the UNESCO World Heritage Tentative List on 21 June 2006, in the Cultural category.
