= Sumatralith =

Southeast Asian archaeological stone artifact

A sumatralith is a unifacial stone tool closely associated with the Hoabinhian techno-complex of Southeast Asia and manufactured by hunter-gatherer communities during the late Pleistocene to the middle Holocene. They are oval to rectangular in shape with unifacial flaking along the circumference of a rounded cobble or pebble. Sumatraliths are considered "master fossils" since they are often the most important artifact when identifying a Hoabinhian archaeological assemblage.

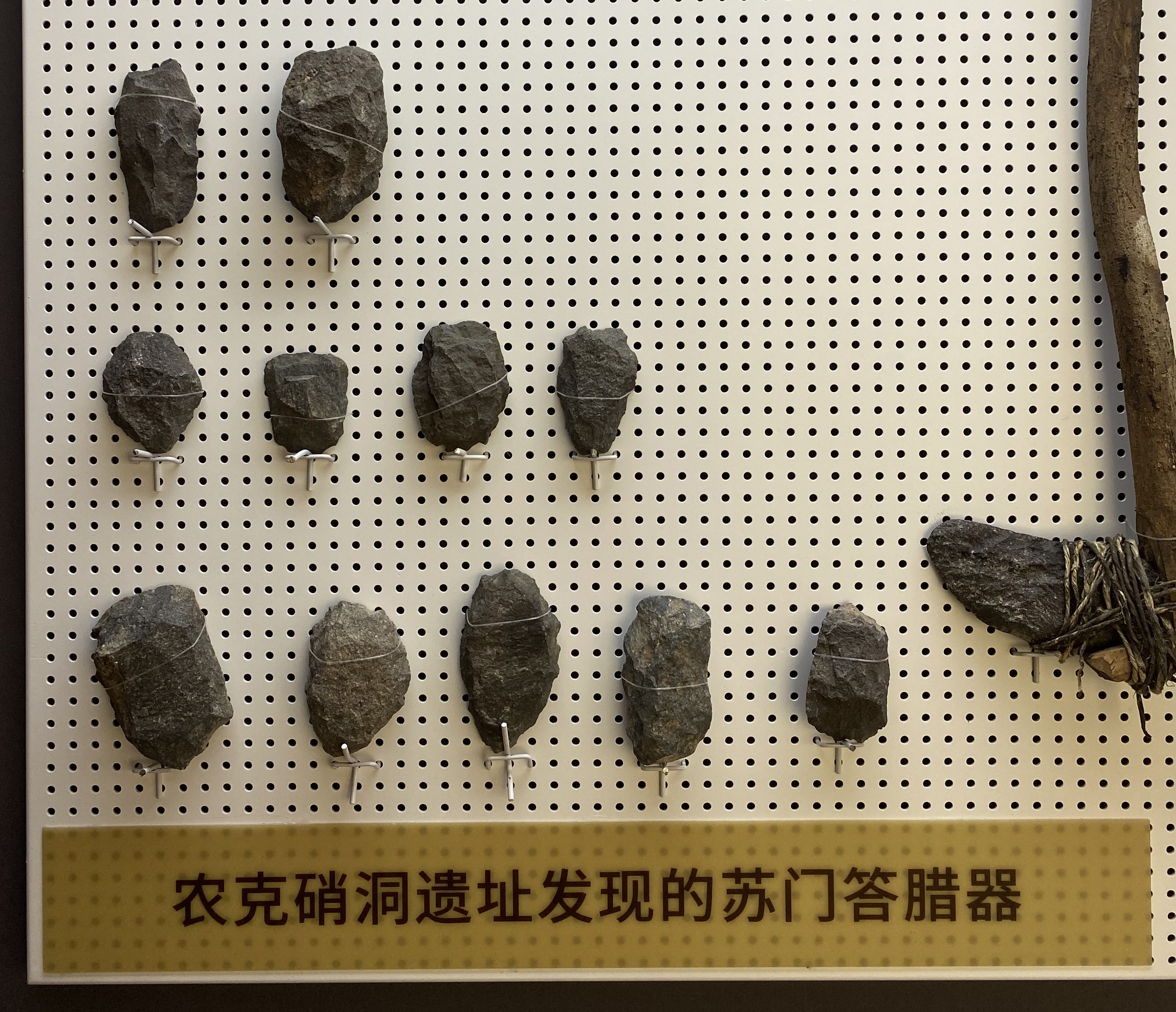
Sumatralith from Nongke Xiaodong Cave Archeological Site, Cangyuan, and currently collected in Lincang Archeological Museum, Yunnan, China

== Origin of the word "Sumatralith" ==
The word "sumatralith" is derived from the place of its original identification in North Sumatra, Indonesia, where J. Neumann first recovered unifacial stone tools from a shell midden at Batu Kenong in 1920.

== Morphology and manufacture ==
Sumatraliths are typically made from quartzite or andesite river cobbles. The end product of a typical sumatralith operational sequence, or chaîne opératoire, is a plano-convex (i.e. flat on one side, convex on the opposite side) stone tool with little to no shaping of the original cobble except for percussive flake removal along its periphery which is only applied to one face to produce its cutting edges. Since the tool is minimally shaped, there remains a significant amount of cortex on the final product. A sumatralith blank is either a rounded cobble or pebble already roughly the preferred elliptical, flattened shape of the final product. The homothetic structure of these tools allows for their continued resharpening and reshaping to produce smaller yet effective stone tools, thus prolonging the utility of a single original cobble or pebble blank.

== Common association and use ==
Their direct association with a variety of faunal and plant remains suggests everyday use in subsistence practices. At Spirit Cave, sumatraliths have been found in association with hearth features which provide evidence for the collection of plant products such as peas, beans, almonds, betel, pepper trees, butternuts, candlenuts, cucumbers, and bottle gourds, as well as the acquisition of game like wild cattle, pig, and deer. Ethnographic research from Australia shows sumatralith use by modern day hunter-gatherers in the form of short-axes, attaching them to a short handle at 45 degrees. Similar mechanisms for use are inferred for Hoabinhian subsistence strategies.

== Categories of Sumatraliths ==
The Hoabinhian assemblage excavated near Medan in Eastern Sumatra was composed mostly of unifacial sumatraliths, a single broken biface being the exception. Early methods to categorize sumatraliths typically resulted in three distinct designations. For example, Mühlhofer organized them as 1) large and broad unifacial tools, 2) large and narrow unifacial tools, and 3) simply small unifacial tools. Alternatively, Lebzelter chose to separate them into 1) oval/disc-shaped/elongated pick-like tools, 2) flakes from pebbles, and 3) broad facetted flakes. Analysis of Sumatra Hoabinhian assemblages has revealed that sumatra-type lithics had 2 primary functions, as scrapers and hand axes.

== Ritual significance ==
While there are only a few instances which suggest their ritual significance, the instances encountered provide strong arguments for it. Burials provide much of the basis for ritual interpretation in the archaeological record and Hoabinhian burials are uncommon. Nonetheless, one burial at Spirit Cave suggests that sumatraliths were ritually deposited in their owner's/maker's grave. Burials at Moh Khiew also show ritual interment of the lithics. One remarkable burial at Gua Gunung Runtuh is that of a middle-aged man interred with a single sumatralith exhibiting use-wear markings indicative of prehumous ownership. However, the 15 identified Hoabinhian burials at Gua Cha all lack these tools. This is indicative of nuance in the ritual importance of sumatraliths across the Hoabinhian.

== Geographic distribution ==
Sumatraliths have been recovered from archaeological sites across mainland and parts of island Southeast Asia. There has been some debate as to whether or not the Hoabinhian geographic range included South China or even Nepal. However, the complete lack of sumatralith tools at these sites suggests to some archaeologists that they belong to "Hoabinhian-like industries," despite the presence of other artifacts typically associated with the Hoabinhian.

Sumatralith-bearing sites are most commonly found in rock shelters or caves. However, ethnographic study of the Mani and Semang, modern hunter-gatherer groups who are believed to practice similar subsistence strategies to Hoabinhian groups, suggest that they likely inhabited a wider geographical range where the evidence hasn't been sufficiently preserved.

== Bibliography ==
- Van Tan, H. A. 1997. The Hoabinhian and before. Bulletin of the Indo-Pacific Prehistory Association, 16, 35–41.
- Yinghua, L., Dung, L. T. M., So’n, Đ. H., Fajun, L., Forestier, H., Yuduan, Z., Peng, C., Liwei, W., Chengpo, H., & Tingting, L. 2021. A New Technological Analysis of Hoabinhian Stone Artifacts from Vietnam and its Implications for Cultural Homogeneity and Variability between mainland Southeast Asia and South China. Asian Perspectives, 60(1), 71–96.
- Zhou, Y., Lan, X., Shen, Z., Qiu, K., Jiang, Y., Sophady, H., Yang, R., & Forestier, H. 2025. What can lithics tell us about technological complexity? Reflections on and around the Hoabinhian phenomenon in the cobble world. Archaeometry, 1–18.
- Zeitoun, V., Bourdon, E., Latsachack, K. O., Pierret, A., Singthong, S., Baills, H., & Forestier, H. 2019. Discovery of a new open-air Hoabinhian site in Luang Prabang province (Lao PDR). Dating and technological study of the lithic assemblage. Comptes Rendus Palevol, 18(1), 142–157.
- VAN HEEKEREN, H. R. (1957). MESOLITHIC. In The Stone Age of Indonesia (Vol. 21, pp. 67–115). Brill. http://www.jstor.org/stable/10.1163/j.ctvbqs588.6
- Gorman, C. F. (1969). Hoabinhian: A Pebble-Tool Complex with Early Plant Associations in Southeast Asia. Science, 163(3868), 671–673. http://www.jstor.org/stable/1726336
- Charles Higham. (2013). Hunter-Gatherers in Southeast Asia: From Prehistory to the Present. Human Biology, 85(1–3), 21–43. https://doi.org/10.13110/humanbiology.85.1-3.0021
