= Complex of Huế Monuments =

UNESCO World Heritage Site in Huế, Vietnam

Complex of Huế Monuments Quần thể di tích Cố đô Huế
UNESCO World Heritage Site
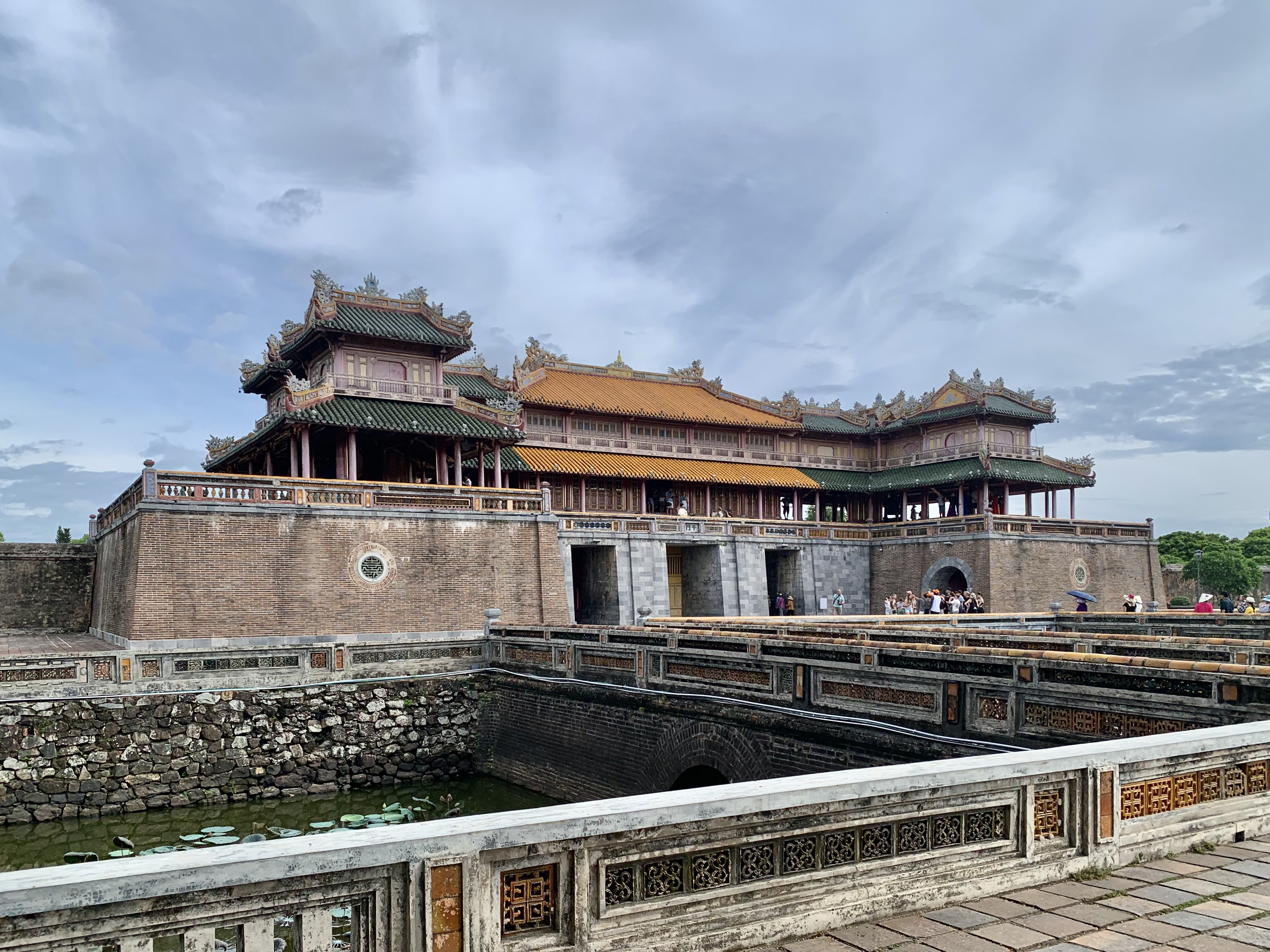
- The Meridian Gate to the Imperial Citadel, Huế
- Official name: Complex of Huế Monuments
- Location: Huế, Việt Nam
- Criteria: Cultural: iv
- Reference: 678
- Inscription: 1993 (17 Session)

The Complex of Huế Monuments (Vietnamese: Quần thể di tích Cố đô Huế) is a UNESCO World Heritage Site-listed relic complex located in the city of Huế, central Vietnam.It was the first Vietnam's site inscribed on the UNESCO list in 1993. Established as the capital of newly unified Vietnam in 1802 under the reign of emperor Gia Long, Hue played a vital role as the political, cultural, and religious center of the empire.

The complex consists of 3 concentric enclosures, Kinh thành (the Citadel, an outermost defensive fortress wall) Hoàng thành (the Imperial City middle administrative and ceremonial enclosure),and the Tử Cấm Thành (Purple Forbidden City, the innermost private residential compound for the Emperor). It also includes associated monuments outside of the city, including the tombs of the emperors Gia Long, Minh Mạng, Thiệu Trị, Tự Đức, Dục Đức, Đồng Khánh, and Khải Định, and a string of temples, pagodas, and other spiritual sites.

The structures of the Complex of Huế Monuments are carefully placed within the natural setting of the site and aligned with the concept of oriential geomancy and Five elements which including Five Cardinal Points (center, west, east, north, south), the Five Elements (earth, metal, wood, water, fire), and the Five Colors (yellow, white, blue, black, red).

The architecture of the Complex of Huế Monuments is based on the North and the South in compass, with three rounds: the outside wall, the middle imperial citadel where the Thai Hoa Palace ceremonial hall is located, and the purple forbidden city imperial palace in the center. The natural geographic composition of a pair of river and mountain is a significant regional feature of the site from Northern to the Southern of Vietnam. A June 2026 UNESCO climate-action study highlights that the complex was engineered as a sophisticated hydraulic urban landscape: Its network of canals, defensive moats, lotus ponds and royal gardens regulated microclimates and mitigated flood impacts. The royal architecture of Huế is a blend of traditional styles from former Vietnamese dynasties, the quintessence of Chinese fine arts, the selected elements on the basis of national consciousness and some Westernizations brought by French architects working for Emperor Gia Long.

The Thai Hoa Palace is the principal ceremonial hall of the Nguyen dynasty emperors. Its name translates in Sino-Vietnamese to "Great peace and harmony", an auspicious name used across East Asia for royal halls or settlements like the unrelated town of Thai Hoa. It completed a three-years restoration in 2024 and became the first UNESCO cultural heritage site in Vietnam to earn the LOTUS Green Building certification from the Vietnam Green Building Council. In June 2026 the throne of the Nguyen Dynasty, a Viet Nam national treasure, was reinstated at its original central position inside the Thai Hoa Palace after restoration.
