= Sop Pong =

Sop Pong สบป่อง
- Subdistrict
- Main street of Sop Pong in 2024
- Interactive map of Sop Pong
- Country: Thailand
- Province: Mae Hong Son
- District: Pang Mapha District

Population (2005)
  - Total: 7,398
- Time zone: UTC+7 (ICT)

Sop Pong, sometimes mistakenly spelled "Sappong", (Thai: สบป่อง) is a village and tambon (sub-district) of Pang Mapha District in Mae Hong Son Province, Thailand. It had a population of 7,398 in 2005. The tambon contains eight villages.

== Notable features ==
=== Temples ===
Sop Pong has two Buddhist temples, at either end of the village, including a forest monk temple, called Wat Ming Muang. It also has a Christian church, a Chinese temple, and a Haw Chinese Muslim mosque in old Sop Pong.

=== Nature ===
The Lang River runs through the town, and passes through Tham Lot Cave. Sop Pong has many other caves, with some prehistoric items. In 2015, The Man With The Iron Fists 2, released in April, had a mine scene filmed in Tham Lot Cave.
