= Ngườm =

Cave and archaeological site in Vietnam

Ngườm is an archaeological site in Thái Nguyên Province, northern Vietnam. It is a rock shelter in a limestone cliff near the Thần Sa River that was excavated in 1981 by archaeologists from the Vietnam Institute of Archaeology. Flaked stone artefacts have been found in deposits containing shells with radiocarbon ages of 23,000 years ago. The site is important because of its unusually high proportion of retouched flakes in the stone artefact assemblage, relative to other sites in Southeast Asia.
