= Pang Mapha subdistrict =

Pang Mapha ปางมะผ้า
- Subdistrict
- Interactive map of Pang Mapha
- Country: Thailand
- Province: Mae Hong Son
- District: Pang Mapha

Population (2005)
  - Total: 4,017
- Time zone: UTC+7 (ICT)

Pang Mapha (Thai: ปางมะผ้า) is a village and tambon (sub-district) of Pang Mapha District, in Mae Hong Son Province, Thailand. In 2005 it had a population of 4,017. The tambon contains 11 villages.
