= Bắc Sơn culture =

Period of the Neolithic Age in Vietnam

The Bắc Sơn culture is the name given to a period of the Neolithic Age in Vietnam. The Bắc Sơn culture, also called the Bacsonian period, is often regarded as a variation of the Hoabinhian industry characterized by a higher frequency of edge-grounded cobble artifacts compared to earlier Hoabinhian artifacts.
