= Chester Gorman =

American anthropologist and archaeologist

Chester F. Gorman (March 11, 1938 – June 7, 1981) was an American anthropologist and archaeologist.

Born in Oakland, California, he grew up on his parents' dairy farm in Elk Grove. He studied at the Sacramento State University and the University of Hawaiʻi, where he also got his MA and his PhD.

Chester Gorman worked mostly in Southeast Asia. Among the most significant sites he worked are Ban Chiang in northeast Thailand and Spirit Cave in northwest Thailand, one of the major Hoabinhian sites. While surveying for sites in northeast Thailand with Wilhelm Solheim between 1963-1964, Gorman also discovered the site of Non Nok Tha.

Gorman excavated Spirit Cave (Tham Phii Man) once in 1966 for his dissertation research, and again in 1971. He also excavated Banyan Valley Cave (Tham Sai) in 1972 and Steep Cliff Cave (Tham Phaa Can) in 1973.

He died of cancer at age 43 in Sacramento.

== Publication record ==
- Solheim II, Wilhelm G. and Gorman, Chester F. 1966. Archaeological Salvage Program; Northeastern Thailand-First Season. Journal of the Siam Society 54(2): pages 111-210.
- Gorman, Chester F. 1969. Hoabinhian: a pebble-tool complex with early plant associations in Southeast Asia. Science 163: pages 671-673.
- Gorman, Chester F. 1970. Excavations at Spirit Cave, North Thailand: some interim interpretations. Asian Perspectives 13: pages 79-107.
- Gorman, Chester. 1970. Hoabinhian: a pebble-tool complex with early plant associations in South-East Asia. Proceedings of the Prehistoric Society 35: pages 355-358.
- Gorman, Chester. 1971. The Hoabinhian and after: subsistence patterns in Southeast Asia during the late Pleistocene and early Recent periods. World Archaeology 2(3): pages 300-320.
- Gorman, Chester F. 1971. Prehistoric research in northern Thailand: a cultural-chronographic sequence from the late Pleistocene through to the early recent period. Ph.D. dissertation, Department of Anthropology, University of Hawaiʻi.
- Gorman, Chester and Charoenwongsa, Pisit. 1972. Inundation of archaeological sites. In Ecological reconnaissance of the Quae Yai Hydroelectric Scheme, pages 131–145. Institute of Technology, Bangkok.
- Gorman, Chester F. and Handman-Xifaras, M.E. 1974. Modeles a priori et préhistoire de la Thailande: a-propos des débuts de l'agriculture en Asie du Sud-Est. Études rurales 53-56: 41-71.
- Gorman, Chester and Charoenwongsa, Pisit. 1976. Ban Chiang: a mosaic of impressions from the first two years. Expedition 18(4): pages 14-26.
- Gorman, Chester. 1977. A priori models and Thai prehistory: a reconsideration of the beginnings of agriculture in Southeastern Asia. In Origins of Agriculture, edited by C. A. Reed, pages 321–355. Mouton: The Hague.
- Gorman, C.F. and Charoenwongsa, P. 1978. From Domestication to Urbanization: A Southeast Asian View of Chronology, Configuration and Change. Paper Presented at the Symposium on the Origin of Agriculture and Technology: West or East? Aarhus, Denmark: pages 1-64.
- Gorman, Chester. 1979. Converging views on S. E. Asian prehistory: from Son-Vi to Dong-son. (Summary in Vietnamese.) Khao Ko Hoc 4: 81-82.
- White, Joyce C. and Gorman, Chester F. 2004. Patterns in "Amorphous" Industries: The Hoabinhian Viewed through a Lithic Reduction Sequence. In Southeast Asian Archaeology: Wilhelm G. Solheim II Festschrift, edited by V. Paz, pages 411–441. The University of the Philippines Press: Diliman, Quezon City.

== Sources ==
- MSU eMuseum
