= Hoabinhian =

Archaeological culture in Southeast Asia

The Hoabinhian is a lithic techno-complex of archaeological sites associated with assemblages in Southeast Asia from the late Pleistocene to the Holocene, dated to c. 10,000–2000 BCE. It is attributed to hunter-gatherer societies of the region whose technological variability over time is poorly understood. In 2016, a rock shelter was identified in Yunnan, China, 40 km from the border with Myanmar, where artifacts belonging to the Hoabinhian technocomplex were recognized, dating from 41,500 BCE.

The Bacsonian is often regarded as a variation of the Hoabinhian industry, characterized by a higher frequency of edge-grounded cobble artifacts compared to earlier Hoabinhian artifacts, dated to c. 8000–4000 BCE.

== Definition ==
The term Hòa Bình culture (Vietnamese: Văn hóa Hòa Bình; French: culture de Hoà Bình) was first used by French archaeologists working in Northern Vietnam to describe Holocene period archaeological assemblages excavated from rock shelters. The related English adjective Hoabinhian (French: hoabianien) became a common term in the English-based literature to describe stone artifact assemblages in Mainland Southeast Asia that contain flaked, cobble artifacts. The term was originally used to refer to a specific ethnic group, restricted to a limited period with a distinctive subsistence economy and technology. More recent work by Shoocongdej (2000) use the term to refer to artifacts and assemblages with certain formal characteristics.

=== History ===
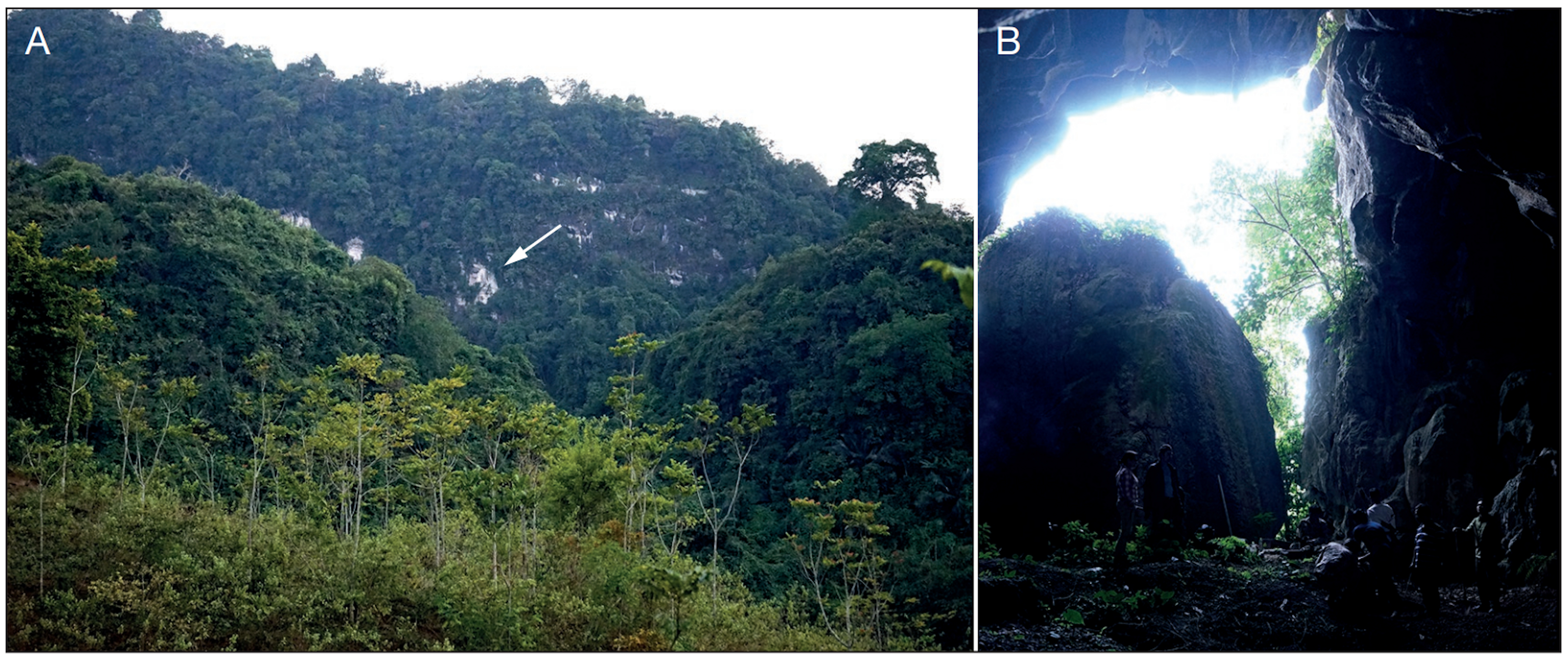
Hiem cave, Hoabinhian

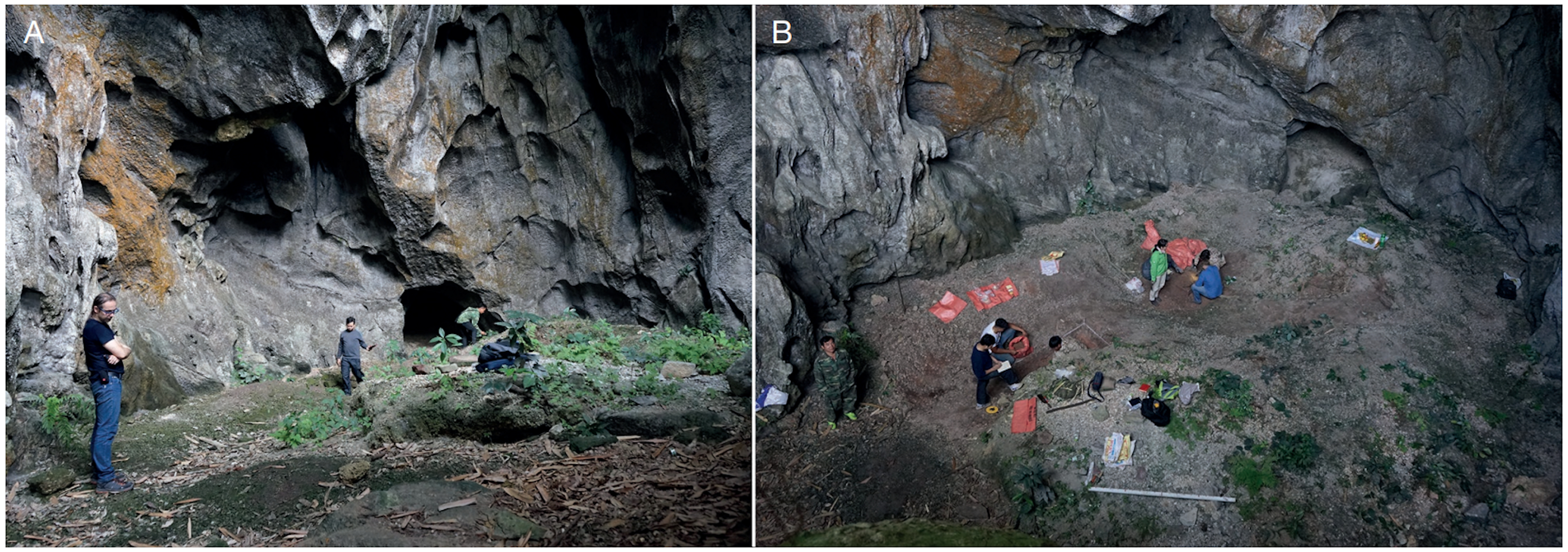
Hiem cave (inside)

In 1927, Madeleine Colani published some details of her nine excavations in the northern Vietnamese province of Hòa Bình. As a result of her work the First Congress of Prehistorians of the Far East in 1932 agreed to define the Hoabinhian as:

a culture composed of implements that are in general flaked with somewhat varied types of primitive workmanship. It is characterised by tools often worked only on one face, by hammerstones, by implements of sub-triangular section, by discs, short axes and almond shaped artifacts, with an appreciable number of bone tools.

Despite the general terms of the definition, Colani's Hoabinhian is an elaborate typology as indicated by the 82 artifacts from Sao Dong that Colani classified into 28 types. The original typology is so complicated that most Hoabinhian sites are identified simply by the presence of sumatraliths. The chronology of Hoabinhian artifacts was assumed to be Holocene because of the extant fauna found in the assemblages and the absence of extinct fauna by Colani and others working before the availability of radiocarbon dating methods in the 1950s.

Problems with Colani's typology were exposed by Matthews (1964) who analyzed metric and technological attributes of unifacially flaked cobble artifacts from Hoabinhian levels at Sai Yok Rockshelter, Kanchanaburi Province, west-central Thailand. His aim was to determine if Hoabinhian artifact types described by Colani could be defined as clusters of constantly recurring attributes such as length, width, thickness, mass, length-width ratio and cortex amount and distribution. Matthews found that Hoabinhian types did not exist and instead Hoabinhian artifacts reflect a continuous range of shapes and sizes.

Following his archaeological excavation and surveys in Mae Hong Son Province, northwestern Thailand, Chester Gorman (1970) proposed a more detailed definition as follows:

1. A generally unifacial flaked tool tradition made primarily on water rounded pebbles and large flakes detached from these pebbles
2. Core tools ("Sumatraliths") made by complete flaking on one side of a pebble and grinding stones also made on rounded pebbles, usually in association with iron oxide
3. A high incidence of used flakes (identified from edge-damage characteristics)
4. Fairly similar assemblages of food remains including remains of extant shellfish, fish, and small-to-medium-size mammals
5. A cultural and ecological orientation to the use of rockshelters generally occurring near freshwater streams in an upland karstic topography (though Hoabinhian shell middens do indicate at least one other ecological orientation)
6. Edge-grinding and cord-marked ceramics occurring, individually or together, in the upper layers of Hoabinhian deposits

Gorman's work included a number of radiocarbon dates that confirmed the Holocene age of the Hoabinhian. Gorman's carbon-14 dates place Hoabinhian levels at Spirit Cave between 12,000 and 8000 BP, these levels have also produced cord-marked ceramics. The term was redefined in 1994 by archaeologists attending a conference held in Hanoi. At this conference Vietnamese archaeologists presented evidence of Hoabinhian artifacts dating to 17,000 years before the present. A vote was held where it was agreed that

1. The concept of the Hoabinhian should be kept
2. The best concept for "Hoabinhian" was an industry rather than a culture or techno-complex
3. The chronology of the Hoabinhian industry dates is from "late-to-terminal Pleistocene to early-to-mid Holocene"
4. The term "Sumatralith" should be retained
5. The Hoabinhian Industry should be referred to as a "cobble" rather that a "pebble" tool industry
6. The Hoabinhian should not be referred to as a "Mesolithic" phenomenon

== Pre-Hoabinhian technology ==
Hà Văn Tấn outlined in his paper his definition of a lithic technology that occurred before the Hoabinhian. He found primitive flakes in stratigraphy below Hoabinhian pebble tools across several sites in Southeast Asia which led him to name the flake technology, Nguomian – named after a large assembly of flakes found at the Ngườm rock shelter in Thái Nguyên province, Vietnam. Hoabinhian technology is also claimed to be a continuation of the Sonvian technology.

== Geographical distribution ==
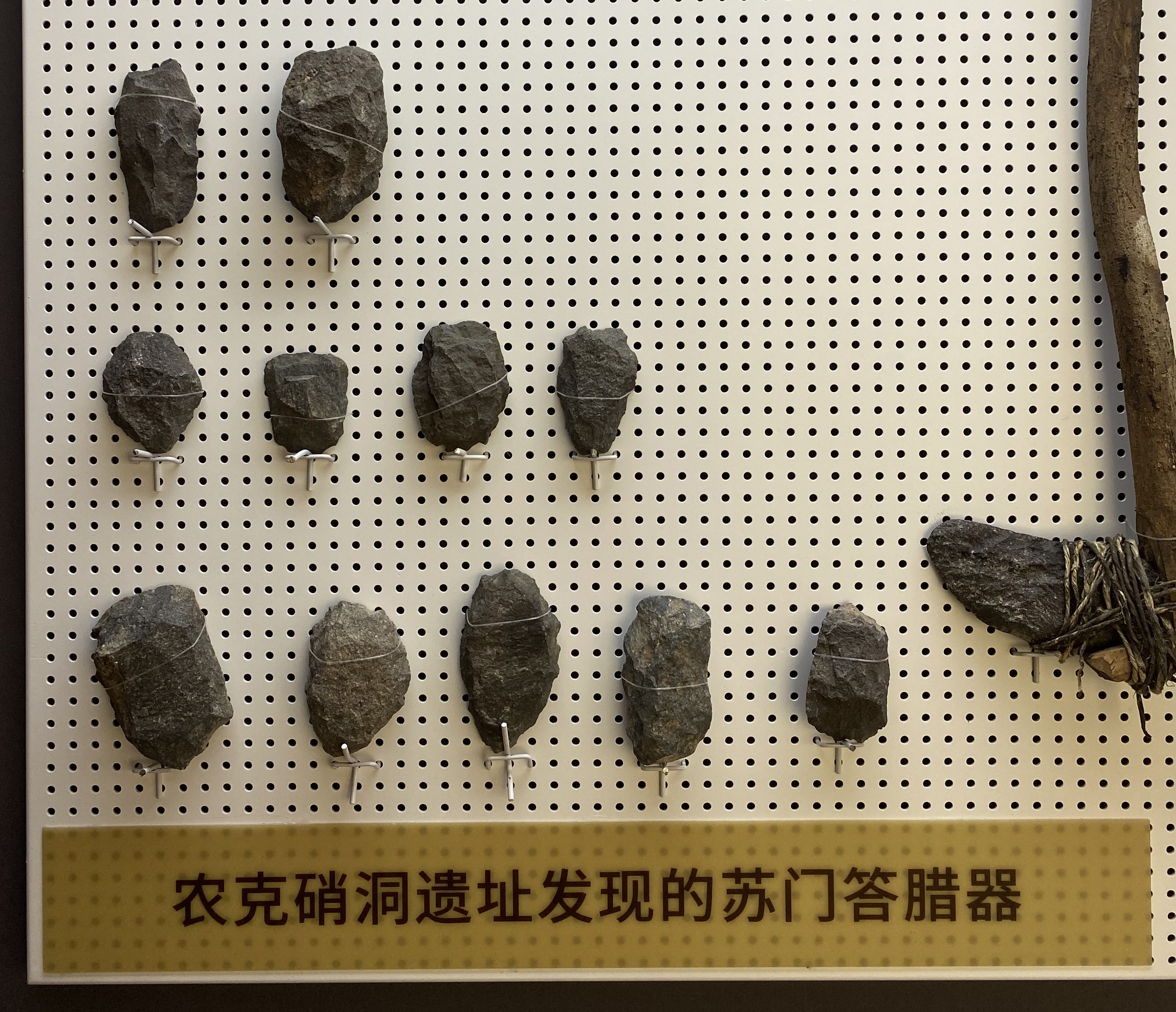
Sumatralith from Nongke Xiaodong Cave, the oldest Hoabinhian complex.

Since the term was first used to describe assemblages from sites in Vietnam, many sites throughout mainland and island Southeast Asia have been described as having Hoabinhian components. The apparent concentration of more than 120 Hoabinhian sites in Vietnam reflects intensive research activities in this area rather the location of a center of the prehistoric Hoabinhian activity.

The oldest Hoabinhian complex was discovered at Xiaodong, a large rockshelter in Yunnan, China, 40 kilometres (25 mi) from the Burmese border. It is the only Hoabinhian site discovered in China.

Archaeological sites in Terengganu, Sumatra, Thailand, Laos, Myanmar, and Cambodia have been identified as Hoabinhian, although the quality and quantity of descriptions vary and the relative significance of the Hoabinhian component at these sites can be difficult to determine.

Recent archaeological research indicates that variation in Hoabinhian artifacts across regions are largely influenced by local, region-specific proximity to resources and changes in environmental conditions.

Beyond this core area, some archaeologists argue that there are isolated inventories of stone artifacts displaying Hoabinhian elements in Nepal, South China, Taiwan, and Australia.

== Hoabinhian and plant domestication ==
Gorman (1971) claimed that Spirit Cave included remains of Prunus (almond), Terminalia, Areca (betel), Vicia (broadbean) or Phaseolus, Pisum (pea) or Raphia lagenaria (bottle gourd), Trapa (water caltrop), Piper (pepper), Madhuca (butternut), Canarium, Aleurites (candle nut), and Cucumis (a cucumber type) in layers dating to c. 9800–8500 BP. None of the recovered specimens differed from their wild phenotypes. He suggested that these may have been used as foods, condiments, stimulants, for lighting and that the leguminous plants in particular "point to a very early use of domesticated plants'. He later wrote (1971:311) that 'Whether they are definitely early cultigens (see Yen n.d.:12) remains to be established... What is important, and what we can say definitely, is that the remains indicate the early, quite sophisticated use of particular species which are still culturally important in Southeast Asia."

In 1972, W. G. Solheim, as the director of the project of which Spirit Cave was part, published an article in Scientific American discussing the finds from Spirit Cave. While Solheim noted that the specimens may 'merely be wild species gathered from the surrounding countryside', he claimed that the inhabitants at Spirit Cave had 'an advanced knowledge of horticulture'. Solheim's chronological chart suggests that 'incipient agriculture' began at about 20,000 BCE in Southeast Asia. He also suggests that ceramic technology was invented at 13,000 BCE although Spirit Cave does not have ceramics until after 6800 BCE.

Although Solheim concludes that his reconstruction is 'largely hypothetical', his overstatement of the results of Gorman's excavation has led to inflated claims of Hoabinhian agriculture. These claims have detracted from the significance of Spirit Cave as a site with well-preserved evidence of human subsistence and palaeoenvironmental conditions during the Hoabinhian.

Viet (2004), however, focuses on mainly Hoabinhians in Vietnam. Within his wide range of study of this area, Da But is a site that he has worked at which is dated to about fifth to sixth millennium BCE to the end of the third millennium BCE. Within this site, Viet observed that the food Hoabinhians mostly focused on are mountainous shellfish, nuts, and fruit. Interesting enough, the site even shows a new shellfish species that they consumed: an as-yet-unnamed species of freshwater clam of Corbicula spp; species are known to live in swampy areas and lakes.

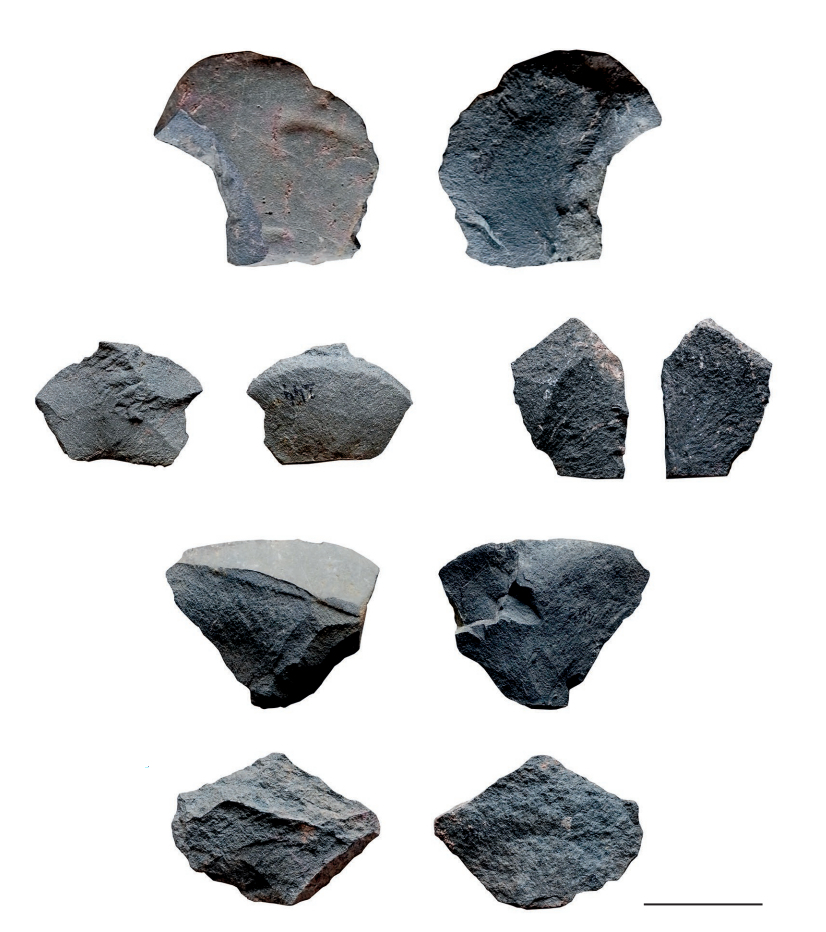
Hiem cave (selected flakes)

The general food sources of Hoabinhians were gathered from the follow environmental conditions:

- Limestone rock mountains (delivering land snails and some small mammals)
- Mountain water sources like streams, small rivers, swamps, and lakes (providing snails and fish)
- Valley earthen surfaces (nuts, fruits, fungi, vegetables, wild cereals, and wild mammals)

== Hoabinhian stone artifact technology ==
An experimental Hoabinhian assemblage was created and analyzed by Marwick (2008), which identified variables and methods that are the most useful in analyzing Hoabinhian assemblages. In particular he advocated for the use of a new method involving the dorsal cortex location of a flake. This method in particular was found to be especially useful in determining reduction intensity and may prove instrumental in answering broader archaeological questions involving subsistence, geographic range, and domestication. Based on Marwick's own research and Shoocongdej's (2000, 2006), behavioral ecological models were applied to examine human behavior through lithic assemblages which found in Tham Lod and Ban Rai rockshelters. In theory, high frequencies of pre-processing should reflect logistical mobility strategy. However, at Tham Lod, a high frequencies of pre-processing (CPM) but a residential mobility strategy (ODM) and a low intensity of occupation (PCM) was observed: We can see an internal conflict between models. A multiple optima model is proposed to explain this contradictory result. Multiple optima model allows more than one optimal scenario and is valid to explain high time-devoting lithic technology (i.e., pre-processing of lithic) and more residential mobility strategy in the same time.

== Genetic links to ancient and modern East and Southeast Asian populations ==
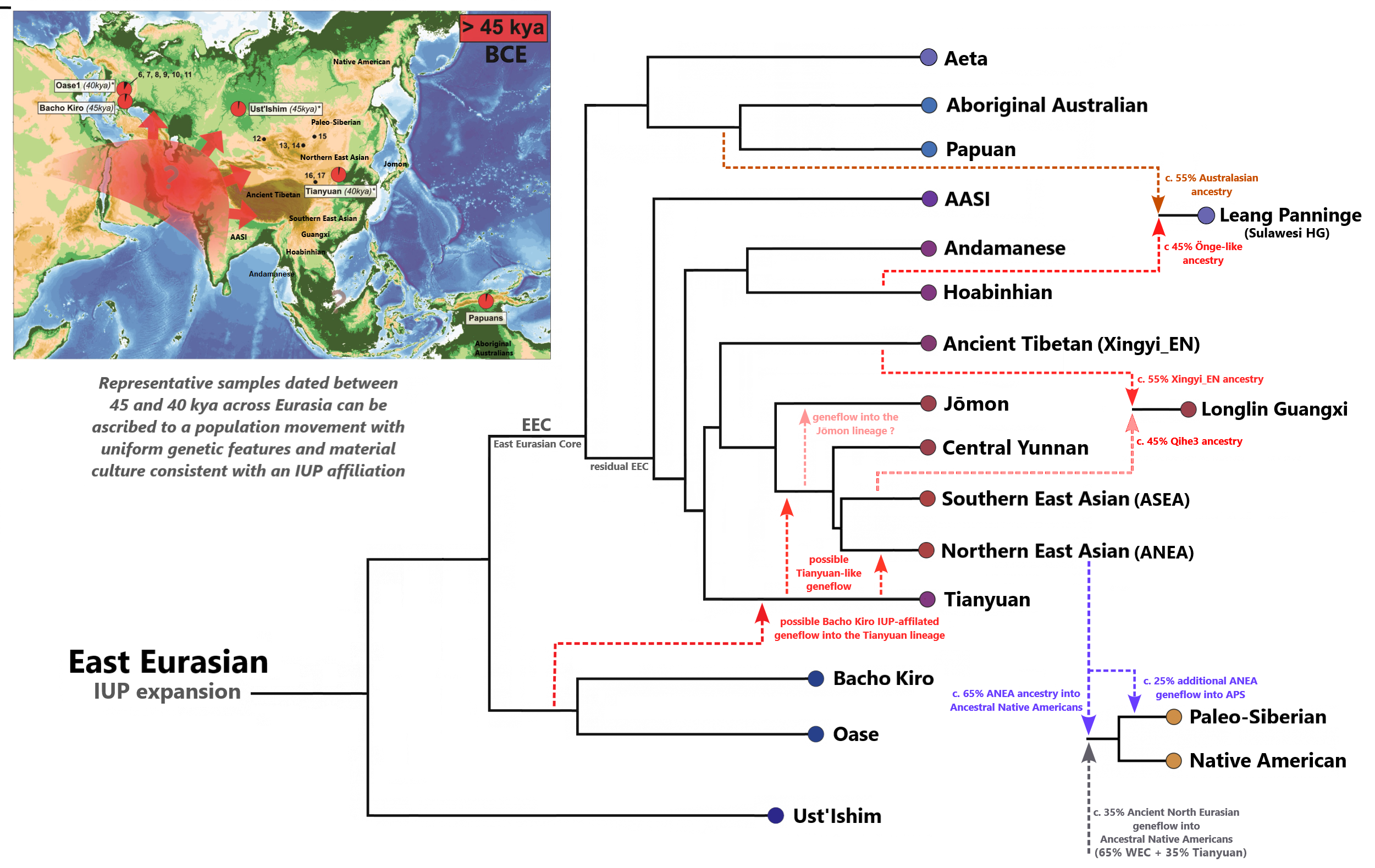
Phylogenetic position of the Hoabinhian lineage among other Eastern Eurasians. Hoabinhian ancestry is described to be deeply diverged from the common ancestor of present-day East and Southeast Asians.

As of 2026, only two ancient DNA samples have been extracted from individuals excavated in Hoabinhian contexts: one specimen from Pha Faen in Bolikhamsai Province, Laos (7888 ± 40 BP) and one from Gua Cha in Kelantan, Malaysia (4319 ± 64 BP). While the Upper Paleolithic origins of the ancestral lineage represented by the two Hoabinhian samples are unknown, this Hoabinhian lineage has been found to be related to the main "East Asian" lineage associated with most modern-day East and Southeast Asians, although deeply diverged from it.

Hoabinhian ancestry has been described as a "deeply branching East Asian ancestry" and inferred to represent the indigenous pre-Neolithic hunter-gatherer groups of large parts of Southeast Asia. They display high genetic affinities with the Andamanese Onge, Jarawa and Semang (also known as "Malaysian Negritos") and Maniq, as well as the Upper Paleolithic Tianyuan man from Northern China and the Jōmon people of Japan. In modern populations, the Maniq people have one of the highest Hoabinhian-related ancestry although they have about 35% East Asian-related ancestry. Austroasiatic-speaking populations in India were also found to have notable genetic affinities with Hoabinhian-related ancestry.

The emergence of Neolithic civilization in Southeast Asia is associated with population movements between southern China and Southeast Asia. Neolithic Mainland Southeast Asian samples can be modeled as having predominantly East Asian-related ancestry similar to ancient populations from southern China, but many of these samples can also be modeled to display a smaller degree of Hoabinhian-related ancestry. In modern populations, this profile of East Asian and more deeply diverged Hoabinhian-related ancestry is most strongly associated with Austroasiatic-speaking groups and can also be reproduced in models where Onge samples are taken as proxies for Hoabinhian ancestry. According to a 2026 study, modern samples of Mainland Southeast Asian populations can be modeled as having less Hoabinhian-related ancestry compared to ancient samples, possibly due to later varying contact and gene flow with South or East Asian-related populations.

== See also ==
- An Sơn (archaeological site) – Archaeological site in Southern Vietnam
- Con Moong Cave – Cave and archaeological site in Vietnam

== Sources ==
- Zeitoun, Valéry; Bourdon, Emmanuel; Latsachack, Keo Oudone; Pierret, Alain; Singthong, Sommay; Baills, Henry; Forestier, Hubert (January 2019). "Discovery of a new open-air Hoabinhian site in Luang Prabang province (Lao PDR). Dating and technological study of the lithic assemblage" (PDF). Comptes Rendus Palevol. 18 (1): 142–157. Bibcode:2019CRPal..18..142Z. doi:10.1016/j.crpv.2018.05.003.

== Literature ==
- Colani M. (1927) L'âge de la pierre dans la province de Hoa Binh. Mémoires du Service Géologique de l'Indochine 13
- Flannery, KV. (1973) The origins of agriculture. Annual Review of Anthropology 2: 271-310
- Forestier H, Zeitoun V, Winayalai C and Métais C (2013). The open-air site of Huai Hin (Northwestern Thailand): Chronological perspectives for the Hoabinhian. Comptes Rendus Palevol 12(1)
- Gorman C. (1970) Excavations at Spirit Cave, North Thailand: Some interim interpretations. Asian Perspectives 13: 79-107
- Gorman C. (1971) The Hoabinhian and After: Subsistence Patterns in Southeast Asia during the Late Pleistocene and Early Recent Periods. World Archaeology 2: 300-20
- Matthews JM. (1964) The Hoabinhian in Southeast Asia and elsewhere. PhD thesis. Australian National University, Canberra
- Marwick, B. (2008) What attributes are important for the measurement of assemblage reduction intensity? Results from an experimental stone artifact assemblage with relevance to the Hoabinhian of mainland Southeast Asia. Journal of Archaeological Science 35(5): 1189-1200
- Marwick, B. and M. K. Gagan (2011) Late Pleistocene monsoon variability in northwest Thailand: an oxygen isotope sequence from the bivalve Margaritanopsis laosensis excavated in Mae Hong Son province. Quaternary Science Reviews 30(21-22): 3088-3098
- Pookajorn S. (1988) Archaeological research of the Hoabinhian culture or technocomplex and its comparison with ethnoarchaeology of the Phi Tong Luang, a hunter-gatherer group of Thailand. Tübingen: Verlag Archaeologica Venatoria: Institut fur Urgeschichte der Universitat Tübingen.
- Shoocongdej R. (2000) Forager Mobility Organization in Seasonal Tropical Environments of Western Thailand. World Archaeology 32: 14–40.
- Solheim, W.G. (1972) An earlier agricultural revolution. Scientific American 226: 34-41
- Van Tan H. (1994) The Hoabinhian in Southeast Asia: Culture, cultures or technocomplex? Vietnam Social Sciences 5: 3-8
- Van Tan H. (1997) The Hoabinhian and before. Bulletin of the Indo-Pacific Prehistory Association (Chiang Mai Papers, Volume 3) 16: 35-41
- White JC, Gorman C. (2004) Patterns in "amorphous" industries: The Hoabinhian viewed through a lithic reduction sequence. IN Paz, V. (ed) Southeast Asian archaeology: Wilhelm G. Solheim II Festschrift University of the Philippines Press, Quezon City. pp. 411–441.
- White JC, Penny D, Kealhofer L and Maloney B 2004. Vegetation changes from the late Pleistocene through the Holocene from three areas of archaeological significance in Thailand. Quaternary International 113(1)
- Zeitoun, V., Forestier, H., Pierret, A., Chiemsisouraj, C., Lorvankham, M., Latthagnot, A., ... & Norkhamsomphou, S. (2012). Multi-millennial occupation in northwestern Laos: Preliminary results of excavations at the Ngeubhinh Mouxeu rock-shelter. Comptes Rendus Palevol, 11(4), 305–313.
