= List of World Heritage Sites in Southeast Asia =

The UNESCO (United Nations Educational, Scientific and Cultural Organization) has designated 50 World Heritage Sites in nine countries (also called "State parties") of Southeast Asia: Cambodia, Indonesia, Laos, Malaysia, Myanmar, Philippines, Singapore, Thailand, and Vietnam. Only Brunei and Timor-Leste (East Timor) lack World Heritage Sites.

Indonesia lead the list with ten inscribed sites, followed by Vietnam with nine, (Note: Vietnam and Laos have one transboundary property: Phong Nha-Kẻ Bàng National Park and Hin Nam No National Park.) Thailand with eight, Malaysia and the Philippines each with six, Cambodia with five, Laos with four, Myanmar with two, and Singapore with one. The first sites from the region were inscribed at the 15th session of the World Heritage Committee in 1991. The latest sites inscribed are Cambodian Memorial Sites: From centres of repression to places of peace and reflection in Cambodia, Forest Research Institute Malaysia Forest Park Selangor in Malaysia and Yen Tu-Vinh Nghiem-Con Son, Kiep Bac Complex of Monuments and Landscapes in Vietnam, inscribed in the 47th session of the Committee in 2025. Each year, UNESCO's World Heritage Committee may inscribe new sites or delist those no longer meeting the criteria, the selection based on ten criteria of which six stand for cultural heritage (i–vi) and four for natural heritage (vii–x); some sites are "mixed" and represent both types of heritage. In Southeast Asia, there are 32 cultural, 14 natural and 1 mixed sites.

The World Heritage Committee may also specify that a site is endangered, citing "conditions which threaten the very characteristics for which a property was inscribed on the World Heritage List." One site in this region, Tropical Rainforest Heritage of Sumatra, is listed as endangered; Angkor and Rice Terraces of the Philippine Cordilleras were once listed but were taken off in 2004 and 2012 respectively.

By comparison with other world regions such as East Asia, South Asia, Middle East, Central America, and Western Europe, the designation of UNESCO sites in the Southeast Asian region has been regarded as 'too few and too slow' since the inception of the 21st century. Scholars from various Southeast Asian nations have suggested for the establishment of an inclusive Southeast Asian body that will cater to the gaps of the region's activities in UNESCO as the majority of nations in the region are underperforming in the majority of the lists adopted by UNESCO, notably the World Heritage List.

== Legend ==
Site; named after the World Heritage Committee's official designation
Location; at city, regional, or provincial level and geocoordinates
Criteria; as defined by the World Heritage Committee
Area; in hectares and acres. If available, the size of the buffer zone has been noted as well. A value of zero implies that no data has been published by UNESCO
Year; during which the site was inscribed to the World Heritage List
Description; brief information about the site, including reasons for qualifying as an endangered site, if applicable.

== World Heritage Sites ==
† In danger
* Transnational site

Site	Image	Location	Criteria	Area ha (acre)	Year	Description	Refs
Angkor	Ruins of a large structure with five large towers at the top.	Siem Reap Province, Cambodia; 13°26′N 103°50′E	Cultural: (i), (ii), (iii), (iv)	40,100 (99,000)	1992	The site was listed as endangered from its inscription in times of political instability following the civil war in the 1980s to 2004.	
Archaeological Heritage of the Lenggong Valley	Lenggong Valley.	Perak, Malaysia; 5°4′N 100°58′E	Cultural: (iii), (iv)	398.64 (985.1); buffer zone 1,786.77 (4,415.2)	2012		
Bagan	Bagan	Mandalay Region, Myanmar; 21°10′00″N 94°52′00″E	Cultural: (iii), (iv), (vi)	5,005.49 (12,368.8); buffer zone 18,146.83 (44,841.8)	2019		
Ban Chiang Archaeological Site	Vase with red and white design.	Udon Thani Province, Thailand; 17°32′55″N 103°47′23″E	Cultural: (iii)	30 (74); buffer zone 760 (1,900)	1992		
Baroque Churches of the Philippines		Manila; Santa Maria, Ilocos Sur; Paoay, Ilocos Norte and Miag-ao, Iloilo; Philippines; 14°35′24″N 120°58′12″E	Cultural: (ii), (iv)	—	1993		
Borobudur Temple Compounds	A terraced pyramid like structure with a stupa on top.	Magelang Regency, Central Java, Indonesia; 7°36′28″S 110°12′13″E	Cultural: (i), (ii), (vi)	25.51 (63.0); buffer zone 64.31 (158.9)	1991	Buddhist monument dating from the 8th and 9th centuries, located in Central Java. The monument structure is a large stepped pyramid crowned with rows of stupas.	
Cambodian Memorial Sites: From centres of repression to places of peace and reflection	Cambodian Memorial Site	Kampong Chhnang province and Phnom Penh, Cambodia; 11°32′58″N 104°55′4″E	Cultural: (vi)	3.9 (9.6); buffer zone 21.9 (54)	2025		
Central Sector of the Imperial Citadel of Thăng Long - Hanoi	Stone tower on top of a stone wall. The wall has circular wheel-shaped windows and a red flag with yellow star is raised on top of the tower.	Hanoi, Vietnam; 21°2′22″N 105°50′14″E	Cultural: (ii), (iii), (vi)	18.395 (45.46); buffer zone 108 (270)	2010		
Citadel of the Hồ Dynasty	A gate built of massive grey stones.	Tây Giai, Vĩnh Lộc District, Thanh Hóa Province, Vietnam; 20°4′41″N 105°36′17″E	Cultural: (ii), (iv)	155.5 (384); buffer zone 5,078.5 (12,549)	2011		
Complex of Huế Monuments	Staircase leading to a building of dark stone. A simple decorated gate is at the top of the staircase.	Huế, Vietnam; 16°28′10″N 107°34′40″E	Cultural: (iii), (iv)	315.47 (779.5); buffer zone 71.93 (177.7)	1993		
Cultural Landscape of Bali Province: the Subak System as a Manifestation of the Tri Hita Karana Philosophy	Jatiluwih Rice Terraces	Bali, Indonesia; 8°20′0″S 115°0′0″E	Cultural: (iii), (v), (vi)	19,519.9 (48,235); buffer zone 1,454.8 (3,595)	2012		
Dong Phayayen-Khao Yai Forest Complex	Medium sized waterfall in a tropical forest.	Saraburi, Nakhon Ratchasima, Nakhon Nayok, Prachinburi, Sa Kaeo and Buriram Provinces, Thailand; 14°20′N 102°3′E	Natural: (x)	615,500 (1,521,000)	2005		
Forest Research Institute Malaysia Forest Park Selangor	The FRIM canopy walkway	Selangor, Malaysia; 3°14′N 101°38′E	Natural: (ii), (vi)	589 (1,460); buffer zone 1,066 (2,630)	2025		
Gunung Mulu National Park	Sunset or sunrise over a mountain landscape with fog in the valleys.	Northern Sarawak, Borneo, Malaysia; 4°8′N 114°55′E	Natural: (vii), (viii), (ix), (x)	52,864 (130,630)	2000		
Hạ Long Bay - Cát Bà Archipelago	Forested rocks in the sea.	Quảng Ninh Province, Vietnam; 20°54′N 107°6′E	Natural: (vii), (viii)	65,650 (162,200); buffer zone 34,140 (84,400)	1994 (Note: First inscription as Ha Long Bay. Extended inscription in 2000 to include natural criterion (i) (in present nomenclature criterion (vii)) and extended again in 2023 to include Cat Ba Archipelago and name change to the present name.)		
Historic City of Ayutthaya	Ruins of stupas of various sizes.	Phra Nakhon Si Ayutthaya Province, Thailand; 14°20′52″N 100°33′38″E	Cultural: (iii)	289 (710)	1991		
Historic Town of Sukhothai and Associated Historic Towns		Sukhothai and Kamphaeng Phet Provinces, Thailand; 17°0′26″N 99°47′23″E	Cultural: (i), (iii)	11,852 (29,290)	1991		
Historic Town of Vigan	Street of three-storied ramshackle colonial style buildings.	Ilocos Sur, Philippines; 17°34′30″N 120°23′15″E	Cultural: (ii), (iv)	17.25 (42.6)	1999		
Hội An Ancient Town	Street lined by rows of two-storied stone houses opening onto the street.	Hội An, Quảng Nam Province, Vietnam; 15°53′0″N 108°20′0″E	Cultural: (ii), (v)	30 (74); buffer zone 280 (690)	1999		
Kaeng Krachan Forest Complex	Kaeng Krachan National Park	Ratchaburi, Phetchaburi and Prachuap Khiri Khan Provinces, Thailand; 13°14′N 5°5′E	Natural: (x)	408,940 (1,010,500)	2021		
Kinabalu Park	Mountain with a rocky top and forested slopes. There is a narro high waterfall on one side of the mountain slope.	Sabah, Borneo, Malaysia; 6°15′N 116°30′E	Natural: (ix), (x)	75,370 (186,200)	2000		
Koh Ker: Archaeological Site of Ancient Lingapura or Chok Gargyar	Prasat Prang, the Pyramid of Koh Ker	Preah Vihear Province, Cambodia; 13°46′59″N 104°32′14″E	Cultural: (ii), (iv)	1,187.61 (2,934.6); buffer zone 3,523.77 (8,707.4)	2023		
Komodo National Park	Komodo dragon at Komodo National Park, Indonesia.	East Nusa Tenggara, Indonesia; 8°33′S 119°29′E	Natural: (vii), (x)	219,322 (541,960)	1991		
Lorentz National Park	A rocky mountain ridge.	Papua, Indonesia; 4°45′S 137°50′E	Natural: (vii), (ix), (x)	2,350,000 (5,800,000)	1999		
Megalithic Jar Sites in Xiengkhuang - Plain of Jars		Xiangkhouang Province, Laos; 19°25′48″N 103°9′10.8″E	Cultural: (iii)	174.56 (431.3); buffer zone 1,012.94 (2,503.0)	2019	Located on a plateau in central Laos, gets its name from more than 2,100 tubular-shaped megalithic stone jars used for funerary practices in the Iron Age.	
Melaka and George Town, Historic Cities of the Straits of Malacca	Town scene with three-storied red houses and a red church. There is a three-storied clock tower standing on a square.	Malacca and Penang, Malay Peninsula, Malaysia; 5°25′17″N 100°20′45″E	Cultural: (ii), (iii), (iv)	154.68 (382.2); buffer zone 392.8 (971)	2008		
Mount Hamiguitan Range Wildlife Sanctuary	Mount Hamiguitan.	Davao Oriental, Philippines; 6°43′2″N 126°10′24″E	Natural: (x)	16,923.07 (41,817.8); buffer zone 9,729.47 (24,042.0)	2014		
Mỹ Sơn Sanctuary	Ruins of buildings of red stone with niches and sculptures. The roof of one of the structures is partially covered in grass.	Duy Phú, Duy Xuyên District, Quảng Nam Province, Vietnam; 15°31′0″N 108°34′0″E	Cultural: (ii), (iii)	142 (350); buffer zone 920 (2,300)	1999		
Ombilin Coal Mining Heritage of Sawahlunto	Ombilin coal mine on 1971.	West Sumatra, Indonesia; 0°40′0″S 100°47′0″E	Cultural: (ii),(iv)	268.18 (662.7); buffer zone 7,356.92 (18,179.3)	2019	Sawahlunto is the oldest coal mining town in South East Asia. At the end of the 19th century, Dutch Indies had discovered and further exploited coal in Sawahlunto.	
Phong Nha-Kẻ Bàng National Park and Hin Nam No National Park*	Landscape with river and densely forested hills.	Bố Trạch and Minh Hóa districts, Quảng Bình Province, Vietnam; Khammouane Province, Laos; 17°32′14″N 106°9′5″E	Natural: (viii), (ix), (x)	217,447 (537,320); buffer zone 295,889 (731,160)	2003 (Note: First inscription as Phong Nha-Ke Bang National Park. Extended inscription in 2025 to include natural criterion (iii) and (iv) (in present nomenclature criterion (ix) and (x)) with include Hin Nam No National Park to be transboundary property with Laos and name change to the present name.)		
Phu Phrabat, a testimony to the Sīma stone tradition of the Dvaravati period	A rock formation with some masonry visible.	Udon Thani Province, Thailand	Cultural: (iii), (v)	585.955 (1,447.93); buffer zone 598.806 (1,479.68)	2024		
Prambanan Temple Compounds	The main shrine of Prambanan temple compound dedicated to Shiva, surrounded by numbers of smaller shrines.	Central Java and Special Region of Yogyakarta, Indonesia; 7°45′8″S 110°29′30″E	Cultural: (i), (iv)	—	1991		
Puerto-Princesa Subterranean River National Park	A river flowing into a cave.	Palawan, Philippines; 10°10′0″N 118°55′0″E	Natural: (vii), (x)	22,202 (54,860)	1999		
Pyu Ancient Cities	Bawbawgyi Pagoda at Sri Ksetra, prototype of Pagan-era pagodas.	Mandalay, Magway, Bago, Myanmar; 22°28′12″N 95°49′7″E	Cultural: (ii), (iii), (iv)	5,809 (14,350); buffer zone 6,790 (16,800)	2014		
Rice Terraces of the Philippine Cordilleras	Batad Rice Terraces.	Ifugao, Cordillera Region, Philippines; 16°56′2″N 121°8′12″E	Cultural: (iii), (iv), (v)	—	1995		
Sangiran Early Man Site	Upper part of a petrified skull including some teeth.	Central Java, Indonesia; 7°24′0″S 110°49′0″E	Cultural: (iii), (vi)	5,600 (14,000)	1996		
Singapore Botanic Gardens	Music was played at this gazebo, known as the Bandstand, in the Singapore Botanic Gardens in the 1930s	Central Region, Singapore; 1°18′55″N 103°48′58″E	Cultural: (ii), (iv)	49 (120); buffer zone 137 (340)	2015		
Temple of Preah Vihear	Ruins of a stone building erected on a stone platform. The roof above the main entrance is decorated.	Preah Vihear Province, Cambodia; 14°23′26″N 104°40′49″E	Cultural: (i)	154.7 (382); buffer zone 2,642.5 (6,530)	2008		
Temple Zone of Sambor Prei Kuk, Archaeological Site of Ancient Ishanapura	A temple in Sambor Prei Kuk.	Kompung Thom Province, Cambodia; 12°52′15″N 105°2′35″E	Cultural: (ii), (iii), (vi)	840.03 (2,075.8); buffer zone 2,523.6 (6,236)	2017		
The Ancient Town of Si Thep and its Associated Dvaravati Monuments	Ancient ruins in a forest	Phetchabun Province, Thailand	Cultural: (ii), (iii)	866.471 (2,141.10); buffer zone 3,824.148 (9,449.68)	2023		
The Archaeological Heritage of Niah National Park's Caves Complex	An external forest view from a cave	Miri Division, Sarawak, Malaysia	Cultural: (iii), (v)3°48′50″N 113°46′53″E	3,690 (9,100); buffer zone 344 (850)	2024		
The Cosmological Axis of Yogyakarta and its Historic Landmarks	Pagelaran front hall of Kraton Yogya	Special Region of Yogyakarta, Indonesia	Cultural: (ii), (iii)	42.22 (104.3); buffer zone 291.17 (719.5)	2023	The 6 km north–south axis central axis of Yogyakarta is positioned to link Mount Merapi and the Indian Ocean, with the Kraton at its centre, has become a centre of government and Javanese cultural traditions.	
Thungyai-Huai Kha Khaeng Wildlife Sanctuaries	A river flowing through a forested mountain landscape.	Kanchanaburi, Tak and Uthai Thani Provinces, Thailand; 15°20′N 98°55′E	Natural: (vii), (ix), (x)	622,200 (1,537,000)	1991		
Town of Luang Prabang	Stone building with golden decorated entrance, stacked and very steep roofs.	Luang Prabang Province, Laos; 19°53′20″N 102°8′0″E	Cultural: (ii), (iv), (v)	820 (2,000); buffer zone 12,560 (31,000)	1995		
Tràng An Landscape Complex	Tam Cốc in Hoa Lư Ancient Capital	Ninh Binh Province, Vietnam; 20°15′24″N 105°53′47″E	Mixed: (v), (vii), (viii)	6,226 (15,380); buffer zone 6,026 (14,890)	2014		
Tropical Rainforest Heritage of Sumatra^{†}		Sumatra, Indonesia; 2°30′S 101°30′E	Natural: (vii), (ix), (x)	2,595,124 (6,412,690)	2004		
Tubbataha Reefs Natural Park	Shark and corrals.	Cagayancillo, Palawan, Philippines; 8°57′12″N 119°52′3″E	Natural: (vii), (ix), (x)	96,828 (239,270)	1993 (Note: First inscription as Tubbataha Reef Marine Park. Extended in 2009 and name change to the present name.)		
Ujung Kulon National Park	Rocky ground within a tropical forest.	Banten and Lampung, Indonesia; 6°45′S 105°20′E	Natural: (vii), (x)	78,525 (194,040)	1991		
Vat Phou and Associated Ancient Settlements within the Champasak Cultural Landscape	Ruins of stone buildings in a very green lush mountain landscape.	Champasak Province, Laos; 14°50′54″N 105°49′20″E	Cultural: (iii), (iv), (vi)	39,000 (96,000)	2001		
Wat Phra Mahathat Woramahawihan, Nakhon Si Thammarat	The main stupa, Phra Borommathat Chedi.	Nakhon Si Thammarat Province, Thailand; 8°24′41″N 99°58′0″E	Cultural: (ii), (vi)	5.356 (13.23)	2026		
Yen Tu-Vinh Nghiem-Con Son, Kiep Bac Complex of Monuments and Landscapes	Yen Tu in 2020	Quảng Ninh, Bắc Giang, and Hải Dương Province, Vietnam	Cultural: (iii), (vi)	525.748 (1,299.15); buffer zone 5,717.878 (14,129.18)	2025		

=== Location of sites ===
Southeast Asia has the fewest UNESCO World Heritage Sites in Asia, next to Central and North Asia, despite being the base of the UNESCO Asia-Pacific headquarters located in Bangkok, Thailand and having a diverse line of natural and cultural heritage sites. Due to this, numerous scholars have been calling on Southeast Asian governments to participate and nominate more sites in UNESCO annually.

Various institutions have also criticized UNESCO for its 'Europe-centric' designations. An example of which was when UNESCO declared 10 UNESCO sites in Italy (a European country) in just a single year (1997). During the same time, 8 sites were declared for the entire Asian continent, where no designated site was located in Southeast Asia at all.

Green - Natural; Yellow - Cultural; Blue - Mixed; Red - In danger

Location of World Heritage Sites in Southeast Asia

=== Performance of Southeast Asia in UNESCO ===
The performance of Southeast Asia is contrasted by the performance of South and East Asia. Southeast Asian countries are in blue.

== Tentative List ==
Brunei and Timor-Leste currently have no tentative list sites. Both Brunei and Timor-Leste are presently undergoing comprehensive research for tentative site submissions. The latest countries revised their tentative lists are the Philippines and Thailand in 2024.

The following lists are the current nomination process for each country.

=== Cambodia ===
There are currently 6 sites on the tentative list.

- The Site of Angkor Borei and Phnom Da (2020)
- The Archeological complex of Banteay Chhmar (2020)
- Beng Malea Temple (2020)
- Ancient City of Oudong (2020)
- Phnom Kulen: Archeological Site/Ancient Site of Mahendraparvata (2020)
- The ancient complex of Preah Khan Kompong Svay (2020)

=== Indonesia ===
There are currently 19 sites on the tentative list.

- Betung Kerihun National Park (Transborder Rainforest Heritage of Borneo) (2004)
- Bunaken National Park (2005)
- Raja Ampat Islands (2005)
- Taka Bonerate National Park (2005)
- Wakatobi National Park (2005)
- Derawan Islands (2005)
- Tana Toraja Traditional Settlement (2009)
- Bawomataluo Site (2009)
- Muara Takus Compound Site (2009)
- Trowulan - Former Capital City of Majapahit Kingdom (2009)
- Sangkulirang - Mangkalihat Karts: Prehistoric rock art area (2015)
- The Old Town of Jakarta (Formerly old Batavia) and 4 Outlying Islands (Onrust, Kelor, Cipir dan Bidadari) (2015) (Nominated in 2018)
- Semarang Old Town (2015)
- Traditional Settlement at Nagari Sijunjung (2015)
- The Historic and Marine Landscape of the Banda Islands (2015)
- Kebun Raya Bogor (2018)
- Tropical Rainforest Heritage of Sumatra – Significant Boundary Modification (2023)
- Karst Landscape Maros Pangkep Prehistoric Cave Area (2025)
- Megalithic Cultural Heritage of Lore Lindu Area (2025)
- Muarajambi Temple Compound (2025)
- The Land Below the Wind: Spice Trade Route on XIII-XVIII AD (2025)

=== Laos ===
There are currently 2 sites on the tentative list.

- That Luang of Vientiane (1992)
- Hin Nam No National Protected Area (2019)

=== Malaysia ===
There are currently 4 sites on the tentative list.

- National Park (Taman Negara) of Peninsular Malaysia (2014)
- Gombak Selangor Quartz Ridge (2017)
- Royal Belum State Park (2017)
- Sungai Buloh Leprosarium (2019)

=== Myanmar ===
There are currently 15 sites on the tentative list.

- Wooden Monasteries of Konbaung Period: Ohn Don, Sala, Pakhangyi, Pakhannge, Legaing, Sagu, Shwe-Kyaung (Mandalay) (1996)
- Badah-lin and associated caves (1996)
- Ancient cities of Upper Myanmar: Innwa, Amarapura, Sagaing, Mingun, Mandalay (1996)
- Mrauk-U (1996)
- Inle Lake (1996)
- Mon cities: Bago, Hanthawaddy (1996)
- Ayeyawady River Corridor (2014)
- Hkakabo Razi Landscape (2014)
- Indawgyi Lake Wildlife Sanctuary (2014)
- Natma Taung National Park (2014)
- Myeik Archipelago (2014)
- Hukaung Valley Wildlife Sanctuary (2014)
- Taninthayi Forest Corridor (2014)
- Pondaung anthropoid primates palaeontological sites (2018)
- Shwedagon Pagoda on Singuttara Hill (2018)

=== Philippines ===
There are currently 25 sites on the tentative list.

- Batanes Protected landscapes and seascapes (1993)
- The Tabon Cave Complex and all of Lipuun (2006)
- Paleolithic Archaeological Sites in Cagayan Valley (2006)
- Kabayan Mummy Burial Caves (2006)
- Butuan Archeological Sites (2006)
- Baroque Churches of the Philippines (Extension) (2006)
- Petroglyphs and Petrographs of the Philippines (2006)
- Neolithic Shell Midden Sites in Lal-lo and Gattaran Municipalities (2006)
- Chocolate Hills Natural Monument (2006)
- Mt. Malindang Range Natural Park (2006)
- Mt. Pulag National Park (2006)
- Apo Reef Natural Park (2006)
- El Nido-Taytay Managed Resource Protected Area (2006)
- Coron Island Natural Biotic Area (2006)
- Mt. Iglit-Baco National Park (2006)
- Northern Sierra Madre Natural Park and outlying areas inclusive of the buffer zone (2006)
- Mt. Mantalingahan Protected Landscape (2015)
- Mayon Volcano Natural Park (MMVNP) (2015)
- Turtle Islands Wildlife Sanctuary (2015)
- The Sugar Cultural Landscape of Negros and Panay Islands (2024)
- The Historic Towns and Landscape of Taal Volcano and its Caldera Lake (2024)
- Colonial Urban Plan and Fortifications of the Walled City of Manila (2024)
- Agusan Marsh Wildlife Sanctuary (2024)
- Kitanglad and Kalatungan Mountain Ranges: Sacred Sites of Bukidnon (2024)
- Corregidor Island and Historic Fortifications of Manila Bay (2024)
- Samar Island Natural Park (2024)
- Prehistoric Sites of the Cagayan Valley Basin (2024)
- Rice Terraces of the Philippine Cordilleras (Extension) (2024)
- Mount Hamiguitan Range Wildlife Sanctuary (Extension) – Pujada Bay (2024)

=== Singapore ===
There is currently 1 site on the tentative list.

- The Padang Civic Ensemble (2022)

=== Thailand ===
There are currently 6 sites on the tentative list.

- Monuments, Sites and Cultural Landscape of Chiang Mai, Capital of Lanna (2015)
- Phra That Phanom, its related historic buildings and associated landscape (2017)
- Ensemble of Phanom Rung, Muang Tam and Plai Bat Sanctuaries (2019)
- The Andaman Sea Nature Reserves of Thailand (2021)
- Songkhla and its Associated Lagoon Settlements (2024)
- Phra Prang of Wat Arun Ratchawararam: The Masterpiece of Krung Rattanakosin (2025)

=== Vietnam ===
There are currently 7 sites on the tentative list.

- Huong Son Complex of Natural Beauty and Historical Monuments (1991)
- The Area of Old Carved Stone in Sapa (1997)
- Cat Tien National Park (2006)
- Con Moong Cave (2006)
- Ba Be - Na Hang Natural Heritage Area (2017)
- The Yen Tu Complex of Monuments and Landscapes (2021)
- Oc Eo - Ba The archaeological site (2022)

== See also ==
- Intangible Cultural Heritage Register of Southeast Asia
- Southeast Asia Memories of the World Register
- UNESCO Biosphere Reserves of Southeast Asia
- UNESCO Global Geoparks of Southeast Asia
- List of World Heritage Sites in Cambodia
- List of World Heritage Sites in Indonesia
- List of World Heritage Sites in Malaysia
- List of World Heritage Sites in Myanmar
- List of World Heritage Sites in the Philippines
- List of World Heritage Sites in Thailand
- List of World Heritage Sites in Vietnam
- List of World Heritage Sites in Asia

== General sources ==
- "World Heritage Committee: Sixteenth session" (PDF). UNESCO.
- "World Heritage Committee: Twenty-eighth session" (PDF). UNESCO.
- "List of World Heritage Sites in Southeast Asia with large pictures".
