= Muaro Jambi =

Muaro Jambi might refer to:

- Muaro Jambi Regency, a regency in Jambi province, Sumatra, Indonesia
- Muaro Jambi Temple Compounds, an archaeological site consisting of several Buddhist temples
