= List of World Heritage Sites in Indonesia =

The United Nations Educational, Scientific and Cultural Organization (UNESCO) World Heritage Sites are places of importance to cultural or natural heritage as described in the UNESCO World Heritage Convention, established in 1972. The convention established that cultural heritage consists of monuments (such as architectural works, monumental sculptures, or inscriptions), groups of buildings, and sites (including archaeological sites). Meanwhile, natural heritage consists of physical and biological formations, geological and physiographical formations (including habitats of threatened flora and fauna), and natural sites with scientific, conservation, or aesthetic merits.

Location of UNESCO World Heritage Sites in Indonesia. Blue dots indicate the three national parks in Sumatra, comprising the site Tropical Rainforest Heritage of Sumatra.

The Republic of Indonesia ratified the convention on 6 June 1989, making its historical sites eligible for inclusion on the list. As of 2023, there are ten World Heritage Sites in Indonesia, six of which are cultural and four are natural. This means Indonesia possesses the highest number of sites in Southeast Asia. The first four sites to be inscribed to the list were the Borobudur Temple Compounds, the Prambanan Temple Compounds, Ujung Kulon National Park, and Komodo National Park in 1991. The most recent addition to the list was the Cosmological Axis of Yogyakarta and its Historic Landmarks in 2023. In 2011, the Tropical Rainforest Heritage of Sumatra was inscribed to the list of World Heritage in Danger, due to threats posed by poaching, illegal logging, agricultural encroachment, and plans to build roads through the site. In addition, the government of Indonesia has nominated 21 sites on the tentative list, meaning that they intend to consider them for World Heritage Sites nomination in the future.

== World Heritage Sites ==
UNESCO lists sites under ten criteria; each entry must meet at least one of the criteria. Criteria i through vi are cultural, and vii through x are natural.

Key
†	Indicates sites in danger

World Heritage Sites
Site	Image	Location (province)	UNESCO data	Year listed	Description
Borobudur Temple Compounds	A view from the temple down, several stupas	Central Java	592; Cultural: i, ii, vi	1991	Originating from the 8th and 9th centuries, Borobudur's temples is made of three levels: a squared pyramidal base, a cone trunk with three round platforms, and topped by a stupa, making up 2,500 square metres (27,000 square feet). The round platforms are filed with 72 ornamental stupas with a statue of the Buddha. The temple was restored by UNESCO in the 1970s.
Cosmological Axis of Yogyakarta and its Historic Landmarks	Pagelaran front hall of Kraton Yogya	Special Region of Yogyakarta	1671; Cultural: ii, iii	2023	This centre of the province's sultanate and cultural events opened in the 18th century by Hamengkubuwono I. With respect to Javanese beliefs about the cosmos and cycle of life, the 6-kilometre (3.7 mi) axis connects Mount Merapi (north) and the Indian Ocean (south), centered by the palace (pictured) and other monuments within the axis, which is linked via traditional rituals. This site was previously in the tentative list as the Historical City Centre of Yogyakarta in 2017, under criteria i, ii, and vi.
Cultural Landscape of Bali Province: the Subak System as a Manifestation of the Tri Hita Karana Philosophy	Panoramic image of a mountainous greenery	Bali	1194rev; Cultural: iii, v, vi	2012	This area consists of five rice terraces and 19,500 hectares (48,000 acres) water temples managed by the irrigation system of subak, dating back to the ninth century. It was inspired by Tri Hita Karana, an Indian philosophy that connects heaven, humanity, and nature. Subak's "democratic and egalitarian farming practices" helps rice growers in accommodating Bali's dense population. The largest and most notable water temple in Bali is the Pura Taman Ayun, established in the 18th century. The Jatiwulih rice terraces is pictured.
Komodo National Park	A komodo dragon at the seashore.	East Nusa Tenggara	609; Natural: vii, x	1991	The Lesser Sunda Islands are inhabited around 5,700 giant lizards, named Komodo dragons due to its features and aggression. Unique to the islands, they are demanded by scientists studying the theory of evolution. The area consists of savannah hillsides and various spiky flora, as well as sandy shores and waters with coral reefs underneath. The picture here is taken in Flores.
Lorentz National Park	A rocky hill beside a lake.	Papua	955; Natural: viii, ix, x	1999	Spanning 2,350,000 hectares (5,800,000 acres), Lorentz is the largest World Heritage Site in Southeast Asia and the only one globally with a transect between snowy and tropical marine areas, including lowland wetlands. Linking two plate tectonics, it comprises mountains and glaciers. Apart from being the location of fossils proving evolution in New Guinea, it is the most biodiverse area in the region. The Jayawijaya Mountains are pictured.
Prambanan Temple Compounds	Several medium-high compounds forming a complex.	Central Java and Special Region of Yogyakarta	642; Cultural: i, iv	1991	Above Prambanan's squared foundation are three temples with reliefs based on the ancient epic Ramayana, dedicated to the three deities in Hinduism: Shiva, Vishnu and Brahma. There are also three temples dedicated to their servant animals. Built in the 10th century, it is the largest temple compound dedicated to Shiva in Indonesia.
Ombilin Coal Mining Heritage of Sawahlunto	A coal mine, with transportation being a cart.	West Sumatra	1610; Cultural: ii, iv	2019	The Dutch East Indies colonial government sought for high-quality coal in Sawahlunto, West Sumatra, and made this mine for accessibility, constructed from the late 19th to early 20th century. With workers comprising locals and convicts, the system accommodates the linear process of extraction, processing, transport, shipment of the coal. This heritage site includes the mining area, the Port of Teluk Bayur (used to store the coal), the railway connecting the two, and the company town. Pictured is a mining activity in Ombilin, dated 1971.
Sangiran Early Man Site	Upper part of a petrified skull including some teeth.	Central Java	593; Cultural: iii, vi	1996	This site was where the first hominid fossil was discovered during excavations from 1936 to 1941. This propelled the discoveries of half of the known hominid fossils: 50 Meganthropus palaeojavanicus and Homo erectus (French replica pictured). First inhabited one and a half million years prior to inclusion by UNESCO, Sangiran is a key area in studying the human evolution.
Tropical Rainforest Heritage of Sumatra^{†}	Birds at a forested lake	Aceh, Jambi, Lampung	1167; Natural: vii, ix, x	2004	Comprising three national parks—Gunung Leuser National Park, Kerinci Seblat National Park and Bukit Barisan Selatan National Park—this site ranges 2,500,000 hectares (6,200,000 acres) and houses over 10,000 flora, including 17 endemic species. There are also over 200 mammals, including 22 Asian species unique in this Indonesian region, with 15 exclusively living here, like the Sumatran orangutan. There are 580 birds (465 sedentary, 21 endemic). This site is crucial in preserving the diverse Sumatra biota, and biogeographically researching the evolution of the island. In 2011, it is considered endangered due to poaching, illegal logging, agricultural encroachment, and road building plans.
Ujung Kulon National Park	A savanna with animals	Banten and Lampung	608; Natural: vii, x	1991	Located in the southwestern end of Java, this site encompasses the Ujung Kulon peninsula, and the caldera Krakatoa. Crucial in studying inland volcanoes, it has among the largest remaining Javanese lowland rainforests and it is home to multiple species, with the Javan rhinoceros as the one alarmingly threatened. The Cidaon Savanna is pictured.

== Tentative list ==
In addition to sites inscribed on the World Heritage List, member states can maintain a list of tentative sites that they may consider for nomination. Nominations for the World Heritage List are only accepted if the site was previously listed on the tentative list.

Site	Image	Location (province)	UNESCO data	Year listed	Description
Bawomataluo Site	Photograph of a traditional wooden house with a high triangular roof.	North Sumatra	5463; Cultural: i, iv, vi	2009	Located in the North Sumatra province, this 18th-century settlement, designed by the former King Laowo, encompasses 5 hectares (12 acres) and, despite its closeness to the sea, is safe from tsunami due to it being 270 metres (890 ft) above sea level. There are two rows of houses 4 metres (13 ft) apart, with a ritualistic stone monolith in the middle. The complex comprises around 500 houses (one pictured) with a population of 7,000, who are heirs of the Laowos' fourth generation.
Betung Kerihun National Park (Transborder Rainforest Heritage of Borneo)	Photograph of an orangutan amid a forest.	West Kalimantan	1871; Natural: viii, ix, x	2004	BKNP is located at the headwaters of the Kapuas River and makes up 2.76% of the Kapuas Hulu Regency. With high rainfall, 179 peaks, and hundreds of rivers, the 80,000 hectares (200,000 acres) site borders the Lanjak Entimau Wildlife Sanctuary (LEWS) in Sarawak, Malaysia, establishing the two as an orangutan Biodiversity Conservation Area. There are over 1,254 plant species and 652 fauna, 67 and 81 of them (respectively) were listed in the 2000 IUCN Red List of Threatened Species, including Pongo pygmaeus (pictured), one of the two Indonesian orangutan species. BKNP is also utilized by the indigenous Dayak people for hunting and shifting cultivation.
Bunaken National Park	A coral reef, with several fishes lounging about.	North Sulawesi	2002; Natural: vii, viii, ix, x	2005	Formerly a tiny, 5–24 million-year-old continent with volcanic activity 1.5 to 5 million years prior to inscription which created its characteristic tuff, this park is named after the Bunaken Island, the highest island in the area with elevation at over 600 m above sea level and various fossil coral. This site also includes the inactive volcano Manado Tua, an unnamed flat plateau, the dome-shaped Nain Island, the slightly flat Mantehage Island which is seemingly sinking, the coral sand island Siladen, and the areas Arakan-Wawontulap and Molas-Wori located on the Sulawesi mainland. Bunaken Island houses various mangrove forest flats.
Derawan Islands	An underwater view of coral and fishes.	East Kalimantan	2007; Natural: x	2005	The water in this island chain is a coalescence of the Berau River and the Celebes Sea, forming a wide river delta that leads to a sea of patch reefs, fringing reefs, and atolls. It spans 100 miles along the coast of East Kalimantan, and houses an abundance of plants and animals.
The Historic and Marine Landscape of the Banda Islands	A maritime shore, with a hill bordering.	Maluku	6065; Mixed: iv, vi, x	2015	Also known as the Spice Islands due to it used to being the sole location of the nutmeg and mace production during the Dutch, English, and Portuguese era, this chain comprise eleven volcanic islands: Neira, Gunung Api, Banda Besar, Rhun, Ai, Hatta, Syahrir, Karaka, Manukan, Nailaka and Batu Kapal, making up for approximately 8,150 hectares (20,100 acres).
Karst Landscape Maros Pangkep Prehistoric Cave Area	Handprints at an aging wall.	South Sulawesi	6825; Natural: iii, viii, x	2025	Located at a mountainous area in the Bulusaraung Mountains, the Maros-Pangkep area is tropical with fluctuating humidity. Most of the conservation forest is within the karst area that is part of the Bantimurung-Bulusaraung National Park, covering 43,750 ha. In addition to being the habitat of a variety of endemic fauna, there are hundreds of caves which contain prehistoric rock art, stone tools, and shells of a mollusca; it is also the origin of various traditional dances.
Kebun Raya Bogor	An array of yellow flowers	West Java	6353; Cultural: ii, iv	2018	Also called the Bogor Botanic Gardens (BBG), this is an ex situ conservation area ranging 75.4 hectares (186 acres) and home to over 24 natural science research institutions. It was intended to acclimate foreign plants of high economic potential, before broadening its scope to rare endemic plants. The collection is arranged in blocks and grouped by taxonomy and themes. A group of Pachystachys lutea is pictured.
Megalithic Cultural Heritage of Lore Lindu Area	Large stones of various shapes on the grass	Central Sulawesi	6826; Cultural: ii, iii	2025	
Muara Takus Compound Site	A tall brown-black structure.	Riau	5464; Cultural: i, iv, vi	2009	This site is divided into two areas by the Kampar Kanan River; there is also another river known by the locals as the Umpamo or Limpamo River. Its headwaters is located in the swamp southeast of Muara Takus, and ends in the Kampar Kanan, with its estuary situated exactly at the northernmost curve of the Kampar Kanan. There was a settlement at the inner and northern side of the Kampar Kanan's riverbend, but all inhabitants were relocated, due to a hydroelectricity plant project, to a place around 1.5 kilometres (0.93 mi) south. The main stupa is pictured.
Muarajambi Temple Compound	Entrance to a brown, squared temple.	Jambi	6827; Cultural: ii, iv	2025	Once the centre of Buddhism of the Melayu Kingdom in the 7th–14th centuries, the Muarajambi Compound spans 7.5 kilometres (4.7 mi) of the banks of the Batanghari River, with ancient canals leading to the site. Covering 2,062 hectares (5,100 acres), there are around 82 ruins of ancient brick buildings. There are seven temples: Gumpung (pictured), Tinggi I, Tinggi II, Kembar Batu, Astano, Gedong I, Gedong II, and Kedaton. They were extensively restored, with the remaining ruins surrounded by an endemic plants plantation made by the local Menapo people. Several canals and ponds have been cleared from aquatic plants.
The Old Town of Jakarta (Formerly old Batavia) and 4 Outlying Islands (Onrust, Kelor, Cipir and Bidadari)	View of a colonial area.	Jakarta	6010; Cultural: ii, iii, iv, v	2015	Located at the mouth of the Ciliwung River, Batavia was established by the Dutch East India Company (VOC) as a trading hub in 1619, then modified in 1650. This site comprises the 1650 town (1.5-by-1-kilometre (0.93 mi × 0.62 mi)), and includes the former Jayakarta area, two 18th-century houses, three warehouses, the old town wall remains, a VOC shipyard, the Luar Batang Mosque, Fatahillah Square, the Jakarta History Museum, Chinatown, Kalibesar Canal, as well as the Onrust, Kelor, Cipir, and Bidadari islands.
Raja Ampat Islands	A twilight view of several islands and a sea.	West Papua	2003; Natural: vii, x	2005	Raja Ampat is a chain of 1,500 islands (Kri Island pictured); the largest ones are Waigeo, Batanta, Salawati and Misool. Covering about 4,600,000 hectares (11,000,000 acres); they are situated on the western border of the Pacific Ocean and at the northeastern border of the Indonesian Throughflow, with most being on the Sahul Shelf. Between the lands and water are various sheltered bays and turbidites with karstic limestone formations. In 2003, Raja Ampat was declared a regency.
Sangkulirang – Mangkahilat Karts: Prehistoric rock art area	Painting of a bull in Lubang Jeriji Saléh.	East Kalimantan	6009; Cultural: iii	2015	The Sangkulirang-Mangkalihat Peninsula houses thousands of rock art paintings with red motif, at 35 locations in seven different karstique mountainous places: Merabu, Batu Raya, Batu Gergaji, Batu Nyere, Batu Tutunambo, Batu Pengadan and Batu Tabalar. It has the most rock artworks in Southeast Asia dating back 5,000 years prior to WHS inscription, and has spiritual themes, with common subjects being handprints, rituals, and hunter-gatherers.
Semarang Old Town	Exterior of colonial building with people walking around.	Central Java	6011; Cultural: ii, iv	2015	Semarang was established in the 17th century as an important economic, political and social hub city. A plethora of buildings with various architectural styles like medieval, Baroque, and modern are preserved in its old town area, a visual record of the city's advancement as propelled by the Industrial Revolution. The government deems this area, which includes office buildings, warehouses, stores, banks, and foreign consulates, worth preserving due to the high threats of flooding and land subsidence.
Taka Bonerate National Park	Photo of coral reefs in the park.	South Sulawesi	2005; Natural: vii, viii, ix, x	2005	With an area of 530,765 ha, the Taka Bonerate National Park includes the third biggest atoll in the world, after Kwajalein in the Marshall Islands and Huvadhu in the Maldives, which encompasses 220,000 hectares (540,000 acres) with coral reefs (pictured) spreading over 500 km^{2}. Meaning "coral piled up on sand" in Buginese, there are 15 islands, with various tourist recreational tours.
Tana Toraja Traditional Settlement	A traditional funeral ceremony at a housing compound	South Sulawesi	5462; Cultural: iv, v, vi	2009	This complex comprises 10 settlements, with facilities like houses (pictured), granaries, burials, ceremonial grounds with menhirs, rice-fields, bamboo forests, and pastures for buffalos and pigs. They occupy about 3.205 km^{2} with plateaus at 300–2,000 metres (980–6,560 ft) above sea level. The settlements are Pallawa, Bori Parinding, Kande Api, Nanggala, Buntu Pune and Rante Karassik, Ke'te Kesu', Pala' Toke', Londa, Lemo, and Tumakke. Buntu Pune and Rante Karassik was once combined and thus listed so. Only Ke'te Kesu' has all the facilities mentioned.
The Land Below the Wind: Spice Trade Route on XIII-XVIII AD	Clove trees	Jakarta, Maluku, North Maluku, South Sulawesi	6828; Cultural: ii, iv	2025	
Traditional Settlement at Nagari Sijunjung	A traditional, wooden structure.	West Sumatra	6059; Cultural: iii, v	2015	This site includes two villages, Jorong Koto Padang and Tanah Bato, as well as two large rivers, Batang Sukam and Batang Kulampi. The villages have 76 Rumah Gadang ('big houses') in total, inhabited by nine Minangkabau clans who run by matriarchy as symbolized in the houses' traditional designs. The site also includes paddy fields, a plantation, graveyards, mosques, madarasas, a market, and a community centre. As per the people's philosophy "natural realm as teacher", each houses has a yard with plants deemed ecologically vital.
Tropical Rainforest Heritage of Sumatra – Significant Boundary Modification		Aceh, Jambi, Lampung	6694; Natural: viii, ix, x	2023	
Trowulan - Former Capital City of Majapahit Kingdom	Two tall, brown, wavy structures facing each other, with a gap between that allows people to pass through.	East Java	5466; Cultural: i, v	2009	This is the only remaining site of the Hindu-Buddhist antiquity in Indonesia, the capital city of the Majapahit Kingdom, covering 11-by-9-kilometre (6.8 mi × 5.6 mi). It was built on flat terrains below three mountains: Penanggungan, Welirang, and Anjasmara. Trowulan was advantaged for humans due to its flat surface and shallow groundwater. Since 1815, archeologists began excavating the site, uncovering records of daily life there. It was also revealed to have an extensive, symmetrical canal system. One of its candi bentar is pictured.
Wakatobi National Park	Aerial view of a marine expanse	Southeast Sulawesi	2006; Natural: vii, viii, ix, x	2005	Most waters of Wakatobi originate at a flat surface and then to sea, some of which due to precipices. The deepest seabed is 1,044 metres (3,425 ft) below the surface decorated by sand and coral. The park has 25 coral reef chains, with a circumference of 600 kilometres (370 mi); the total area 1,390,000 hectares (3,400,000 acres). It holds high potential in marine resources and with an "enchanting" seascape.

== See also ==
- List of Intangible Cultural Heritage elements in Indonesia
- List of World Heritage Sites in Southeast Asia
- Architecture of Indonesia
- Culture of Indonesia
- Geography of Indonesia
