= List of World Heritage Sites in Myanmar =

Location of World Heritage Sites in Myanmar. Blue dots indicate the Pyu Ancient Cities.

The United Nations Educational, Scientific and Cultural Organization (UNESCO) designates World Heritage Sites of outstanding universal value to cultural or natural heritage which have been nominated by countries which are signatories to the UNESCO World Heritage Convention, established in 1972. Cultural heritage consists of monuments (such as architectural works, monumental sculptures, or inscriptions), groups of buildings, and sites (including archaeological sites). Natural heritage consists of natural features (physical and biological formations), geological and physiographical formations (including habitats of threatened species of animals and plants), and natural sites which are important from the point of view of science, conservation, or natural beauty. Myanmar, officially the Republic of the Union of Myanmar and also called Burma, ratified the convention on 29 April 1994.

As of 2022, Myanmar has two sites on the list: Pyu Ancient Cities were listed in 2014 and Bagan in 2019. Both sites are cultural. In addition, Myanmar has 15 sites on its tentative list.

== World Heritage Sites ==
UNESCO lists sites under ten criteria; each entry must meet at least one of the criteria. Criteria i through vi are cultural, and vii through x are natural.

World Heritage Sites
Site	Image	Location	Year listed	UNESCO data	Description
Pyu Ancient Cities	A Buddhist pagoda in stone	Sagaing, Magway, Bago	2014	1444; ii, iii, iv (cultural)	This site comprises the remains of three cities of a society that flourished between 200 BCE to 900 CE: Beikthano, Hanlin, and Sri Ksetra. They were the first in the region to adopt Buddhism from India. Religion influenced the society that built large memorial stupas (the Bawbawgyi Pagoda in Sri Ksetra pictured) and other religious structures, some of which present innovative designs with no earlier prototypes. The cities were surrounded by walls and moats, and relied on irrigation for intensive agriculture.
Bagan	Buddhist pagodas at dawn	Mandalay	2019	1588; iii, iv, vi (cultural)	Bagan was the seat of the Bagan Kingdom, the first empire of the region, that reached its peak between the 11th and 13th century. Located on both banks of the Irrawaddy River, the cultural landscape with the remains of the city includes over 3 000 monuments, including stupas, temples, monasteries, and other places of worship. They reflect the Buddhist cultural tradition of merit-making, and are decorated with murals and statutes.

== Tentative list ==
In addition to sites inscribed on the World Heritage List, member states can maintain a list of tentative sites that they may consider for nomination. Nominations for the World Heritage List are only accepted if the site was previously listed on the tentative list. As of 2022, Myanmar lists 15 properties on its tentative list.

Tentative sites
Site	Image	Location	Year listed	UNESCO criteria	Description
Wooden Monasteries of Konbaung Period: Ohn Don, Sala, Pakhangyi, Pakhannge, Legaing, Sagu, Shwe-Kyaung (Mandalay)		several sites	1996	i, iv, v, vi (cultural)	This nomination comprises several Buddhist monasteries, built during the Konbaung dynasty in the 18th and 19th centuries. The oldest one, Ohn Don, dates to 1742. They share similar ground plan, are made of wood, and often richly decorated with woodcarvings, lacquer, metalware, and paintings.
Badah-lin and associated caves	A Buddhist stupa in front of a cave entrance	Shan	1996	iii, iv (cultural)	Excavations in the caves produced artifacts dating from the transition from the Paleolithic to Neolithic period. Red ochre wall paintings were found, depicting human hands, animals, and symbols. Furthermore, findings indicate that the cave was used as stone tool-making workshop.
Ancient cities of Upper Myanmar: Innwa, Amarapura, Sagaing, Mingun, Mandalay	Ruins of religious buildings	Mandalay, Sagaing	1996	i, v, vi (cultural)	These five cities, all located close to one another along the Irrawaddy River, were the capitals of Myanmar and the residences of the kings, from Sagaing in the 14th century to Mandalay after 1857. They are still important religious and cultural centres. Ruins in Innwa are pictured.
Mrauk-U	Foggy view of ruins of religious buildings in a forest	Rakhine	1996	i, iii, iv, vi (cultural)	Mrauk-U was the capital of the Arakanese Kingdom. Due to its location close to the Bay of Bengal, it was an important commercial hub with trade links to the Bengal Sultanate, Portugal, and the Netherlands. The city used the land features, such as hill ranges and rivers, as natural fortifications. There are several Buddhist monuments in the area, mostly from the 15th and 16th centuries.
Inle Lake	Lake and a house on stilts	Shan	1996	iii, v, vi (cultural)	The shores of the mountain Lake Inle are home to several ethnic groups, each of which has different traditions. The lake is used for fishing, transport, and commerce, and there are floating vegetable gardens. Buddhist festivals are held on the lake annually.
Mon cities: Bago, Hanthawaddy	A palace with an intricate roof	Bago	1996	(cultural)	Bago was the capital of the Hanthawaddy kingdom of the Mon people. It was built between the 11th and 17th centuries. The reconstructed Kanbawzathadi Palace is pictured.
Ayeyawady River Corridor	A dolphin swimming	Mandalay	2014	x (natural)	This nomination covers the 400 km (250 mi) long stretch of the Ayeyawady (Irrawaddy) River. It is home to the critically endangered population of the Irrawaddy dolphin (a specimen pictured), which is known for cooperative fishing behaviour with local fishermen. The area is also home (or was home, with reintroduction planned) to two turtle species, the northern river terrapin and the Burmese eyed turtle, and other endangered bird and reptile species.
Hkakabo Razi Landscape		Kachin	2014	vii, ix, x (natural)	The site comprises the Hkakaborazi National Park, the Hponkan Razi Wildlife Sanctuary, and some surroundings. The landscape stretches from lowlands with subtropical evergreen forests to mountain habitats up to the highest peak of Myanmar, Hkakabo Razi (5,881 m (19,295 ft)). The area is home to endangered species including the red panda, white-bellied heron, and black musk deer.
Indawgyi Lake Wildlife Sanctuary	Lake shore with some trees	Kachin	2014	x (natural)	Indawgyi Lake is the largest lake in Myanmar. The lake and the surrounding area, covered with forest, rice fields, and wetlands, are important for migrating waterbirds and home to endangered species, including the white-rumped vulture and slender-billed vulture, as well as the endemic Burmese peacock softshell turtle and several species of fish.
Natma Taung National Park	Trees in front of a mountain	Chin	2014	vii, ix, x (natural)	National park covers the area around Mount Nat Ma Taung (3,051 m (10,010 ft)), the highest peak of the region. As the mountain rises sharply above the surrounding lowlands, it acts as a sky island with several mountain species of plants. It is also home to the white-browed nuthatch, an endangered bird species.
Myeik Archipelago	River surrounded by forest	Taninthayi	2014	ix, x (natural)	The archipelago consists of about 800 islands made of granite and limestone. The islands are covered by mangroves and lowland evergreen forests while the surrounding sea has extensive coral reefs. They are home to the dugong, several species of sharks, sea turtles, as well as birds, such as the plain-pouched hornbill.
Hukaung Valley Wildlife Sanctuary	River from above, mountains far	Kachin, Sagaing	2014	ix, x (natural)	The sanctuary along the Hukawng Valley comprises different habitats: from floodplains of the Chindwin River, evergreen forests, to pine forests in the mountains. It is home to the Asian elephant, tiger, white-bellied heron, and rufous-necked hornbill. The floodplains are important to waterbirds.
Taninthayi Forest Corridor	Grass, trees, and an information board	Taninthayi	2014	ix, x (natural)	The nomination covers low and mid-elevation seasonal evergreen forests along the Myanmar-Thai border. The area is at the meeting point between the Indo-Chinese and Sundaic flora and fauna, and is home to endangered species, including Gurney's pitta, Asian elephant, and Sunda pangolin.
Pondaung anthropoid primates palaeontological sites		Magway, Sagaing	2018	viii (natural)	This site covers the fossil beds where some of the oldest remains of anthropoid primates have been discovered. They are about 40 million years old, from the Middle Eocene, and provide insight into the evolution of the primates and information about the flora and fauna of the period they lived in.
Shwedagon Pagoda on Singuttara Hill	A large gold-plated pagoda and several small ones	Yangon	2018	i, ii, iii, iv, vi (cultural)	The Shwedagon Pagoda is the most sacred pagoda in Myanmar and an important Buddhist pilgrimage site. It is believed to hold Buddhist relics. According to the local legend, it was built about 2 600 years ago, while the archaeologists date it some time between the 6th and 10th centuries. After the 14th century, it was renovated and enlarged several times. The central stupa now reaches 112 m (367 ft) high. It is covered in gold and precious stones.

== See also ==
- Tourism in Myanmar
