= List of Intangible Cultural Heritage elements in Indonesia =

The United Nations Educational, Scientific and Cultural Organisation (UNESCO) identifies intangible cultural heritage as the "non-physical traditions and practices that are performed by a people". As part of a country's cultural heritage, they include celebrations, festivals, performances, oral traditions, music, and the making of handicrafts. The "intangible cultural heritage" is defined by the Convention for the Safeguarding of Intangible Cultural Heritage, drafted in 2003 and took effect in 2006. Inscription of new heritage elements on the UNESCO Intangible Cultural Heritage Lists is determined by the Intergovernmental Committee for the Safeguarding of Intangible Cultural Heritage, an organisation established by the convention.

Indonesia ratified the convention on 15 October 2007.

== Intangible Cultural Heritage of Humanity ==
+ Transnational element

=== Representative List ===
Name	Image	Year	No.	Description
Indonesian Kris		2008	00112	The kris or is a Javanese asymmetrical dagger with a distinctive blade-patterning achieved through alternating laminations of iron and nickelous iron.
Wayang puppet theatre		2008	00063	Wayang is a traditional form of puppet theatre play originating from the island of Java.
Indonesian Batik		2009	00170	Batik is a dyeing technique using wax resist. The term is also used to describe patterned textiles created with that technique.
Indonesian Angklung		2010	00393	The angklung is a musical instrument from the Sundanese that is made of a varying number of bamboo tubes attached to a bamboo frame.
Three genres of traditional dance in Bali		2015	00617	The three genres of traditional Balinese dance are: sacred, semi-sacred and that meant for enjoyment by communities at large.
Pinisi, art of boatbuilding in South Sulawesi		2017	01197	Pinisi refers to a type of rigging –the configuration of masts, sails and ropes ('lines')– of Indonesian sailing vessels. Pinisi-rigged ships were mainly built by the Konjo-speaking people of Ara, a village in the district of Bontobahari, Bulukumba regency, South Sulawesi.
Traditions of Pencak Silat		2019	01391	Pencak silat is an umbrella term for a class of related Indonesian martial arts.
Pantun + (Note: Shared with Malaysia and Brunei.)		2020	02274	Pantun is a Malayic oral poetic form used to express intricate ideas and emotions.
Gamelan		2021	01607	Gamelan is the traditional ensemble music of the Javanese, Sundanese, and Balinese peoples of Indonesia, made up predominantly of percussive instruments.
Jamu wellness culture		2023	01972	Jamu is a traditional medicine. It is predominantly a herbal medicine made from natural materials, such as roots, bark, flowers, seeds, leaves and fruits.
Cultural practices and expressions linked to Balafon and Kolintang in Mali, Burkina Faso, Côte d'Ivoire and Indonesia + (Note: Shared with Mali, Burkina Faso, and Ivory Coast.)		2024	02131	
Kebaya: knowledge, skills, traditions and practices + (Note: Shared with Brunei, Thailand, Malaysia, and Singapore.)		2024	02090	A kebaya is an upper garment opened at the front and made from lightweight fabrics traditionally worn by women in Southeast Asia.

=== Register of Good Safeguarding Practices ===
Name	Year	No.	Description
Education and training in Indonesian Batik intangible cultural heritage for elementary, junior, senior, vocational school and polytechnic students, in collaboration with the Batik Museum in Pekalongan	2009	00318	

=== Elements in Need of Urgent Safeguarding ===
Name	Year	No.	Description
Saman dance	2011	00509	Saman (or the dance of a thousand hands) has its origin in the Gayo ethnic group from Gayo Lues, Aceh province, and is normally performed to celebrate important occasions.
Noken multifunctional knotted or woven bag, handcraft of the people of Papua	2012	00619	Noken is a traditional Papuan multifunctional knotted or woven bag native to the Western New Guinea region.
Reog Ponorogo performing art	2024	01969	Reog is a traditional dance in an open arena that serves as folk entertainment and contains some magical elements. It is from the northwestern region of East Java and Ponorogo is the region where Reog originated.

== See also ==
- List of World Heritage Sites in Indonesia
