= List of Intangible Cultural Heritage elements in Malaysia =

The United Nations Educational, Scientific and Cultural Organisation (UNESCO) identifies intangible cultural heritage as the "non-physical traditions and practices that are performed by a people". As part of a country's cultural heritage, they include celebrations, festivals, performances, oral traditions, music, and the making of handicrafts. The "intangible cultural heritage" is defined by the Convention for the Safeguarding of Intangible Cultural Heritage, drafted in 2003 and took effect in 2006. Inscription of new heritage elements on the UNESCO Intangible Cultural Heritage Lists is determined by the Intergovernmental Committee for the Safeguarding of Intangible Cultural Heritage, an organisation established by the convention.

Malaysia ratified the convention on 27 July 2013.

== Intangible Cultural Heritage of Humanity ==
+ Multinational element

=== Representative List ===
Name	Image	Year	No.	Description
Mak Yong theatre		2008	00167	Mak yong is a traditional form of dance-drama from northern Malaysia, particularly the state of Kelantan.
Dondang Sayang		2018	01410	Dondang Sayang is a traditional form of entertainment where singers exchange extemporaneous Malay poetry, in a lighthearted and sometimes humorous style.
Silat		2019	01504	Silat is a class of martial arts.
Ong Chun/Wangchuan/Wangkang ceremony, rituals and related practices for maintaining the sustainable connection between man and the ocean + (Note: Shared with China.)		2020	01608	
Songket		2021	01505	Songket is a tenun fabric that belongs to the brocade family of textiles. It is hand-woven in silk or cotton, and intricately patterned with gold or silver threads.
Breakfast culture in Malaysia: dining experience in a multi-ethnic society		2024	02113	Breakfast plays an important role in Malaysia. It is centred on traditional foods such as Nasi Lemak and Roti Canai, drinks as Teh Tarik, and spending time together.
Kebaya: knowledge, skills, traditions and practices + (Note: Shared with Brunei, Indonesia, Singapore, and Thailand.)		2024	02090	A kebaya is an upper garment opened at the front and made from lightweight fabrics traditionally worn by women in Southeast Asia.
Pantun + (Note: Shared with Brunei and Indonesia.)		2025	02274	Pantun is a Malayic oral poetic form used to express intricate ideas and emotions.

=== Urgent Safeguarding List ===
Name	Image	Year	No.	Description
Mek Mulung		2023	01610	Mek Mulung is a traditional theatre that is unique to the northwest state of Kedah.

== See also ==
- List of World Heritage Sites in Malaysia
