= Muaro Jambi Regency =

Regency in Jambi, Indonesia

Coordinates: 1°38′25″S 103°44′38″E

Muaro Jambi Regency Kabupaten Muaro Jambi
- Regency
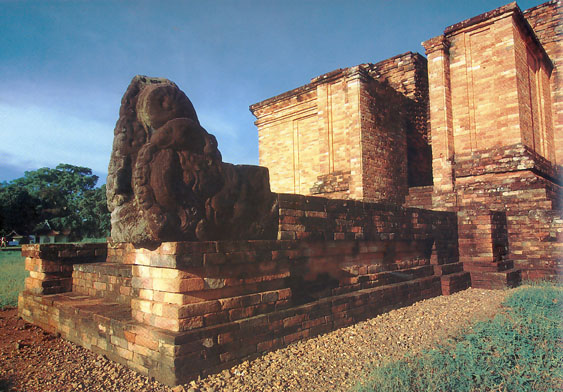
- Makara, the portal guardian statue of Candi Gumpung, a Buddhist temple at Muaro Jambi archaeological site, Jambi.

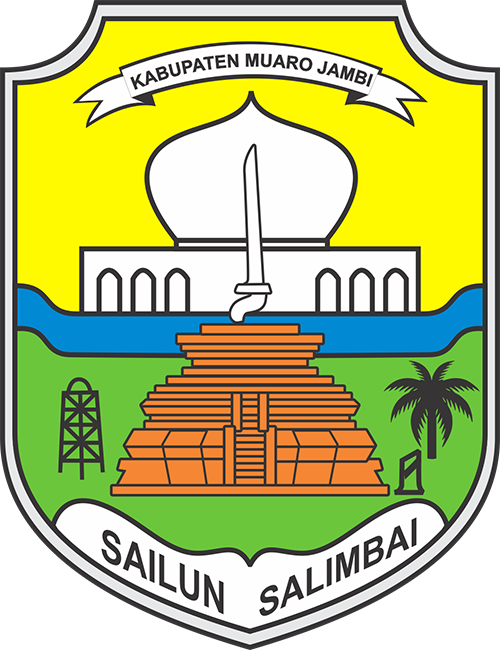
- Coat of arms
- Motto: Sailun Salimbai (As one swing and one wave)
- Country: Indonesia
- Province: Jambi
- Regency seat: Sengeti

Government
  - Regent: Bambang Bayu Suseno
  - Vice Regent: Junaidi Mahir

Area
  - Total: 5,158.14 km^{2} (1,991.57 sq mi)

Population (mid 2025 estimate)
  - Total: 430,246
  - Density: 83.4111/km^{2} (216.034/sq mi)
- Time zone: UTC+7 (WIB)
- Website: muarojambikab.go.id

Muaro Jambi Regency is a regency of Jambi Province, Sumatra, Indonesia. It was created on 4 October 1999 by the separation of what were formerly the eastern districts of Batang Hari Regency. It surrounds on all sides the major city of Jambi, the provincial capital, and includes many of the expanding suburbs of Jambi outside the city boundaries; consequently it has experienced population growth greater than elsewhere in the province. From the 4th until the 13th century, it was the seat of the Hindu-Buddhist Melayu Kingdom. It has an area of 5,158.14 km^{2} and had a population of 342,952 at the 2010 census and 390,347 at the 2020 census; the official estimate as at mid 2025 is 430,246 (comprising 220,547 males and 209,699 females). The regency headquarters are at Sengeti.

== Administrative districts ==
At the time of the 2010 census, the regency was divided into eight districts (kecamatan): Jambi Luar Kota (Jambi city's suburbs), Kumpeh, Kumpeh Ulu, Maro Sebo, Mestong, Sekernan, Sungai Bahar (Bahar River) and Sungai Gelam (Gelam River). Subsequently, another three districts have been added by splitting away from existing districts - Bahar Selatan (South Bahar) and Bahar Utara (North Bahar) from Sungai Bahar District; and Taman Rajo from Maro Sebo District.

These eleven districts are tabulated below with their areas and their populations at the 2010 census and the 2020 census, together with the official estimates as at mid 2025. The table also includes the locations of the district administrative centres, and the number of administrative villages in each district (a total of 150 rural desa and 5 urban kelurahan), and its post code.

Kode Wilayah	Name of District (kecamatan)	Area in km^{2}	Pop'n 2010 census	Pop'n 2020 census	Pop'n mid 2025 estimate	Admin centre	No. of villages	Post code
15.05.05	Mestong	502.26	37,490	40,294	41,900	Sebapo	15 ^{(a)}	36364
15.05.07	Sungai Bahar	150.91	51,170	28,359	29,900	Marga Manunggal Jaya	11	36365
15.05.10	Bahar Selatan	175.84	^{(b)}	16,349	17,200	Tanjung Mulya	10	36366
15.05.09	Bahar Utara	178.86	^{(b)}	13,595	14,300	Talang Bukit	11	36367
15.05.06	Kumpeh Ulu	442.38	45,991	58,645	64,300	Pudak	18	36373
15.05.08	Sungai Gelam	636.25	57,276	70,392	76,900	Sungai Gelam	15	36363
15.05.03	Kumpeh	1,640.77	24,712	24,809	25,400	Tanjung Mulya	17 ^{(c)}	36371
15.05.04	Maro Sebo	280.69	28,179	21,368	23,000	Jambi Kecil	12 ^{(d)}	36382
15.05.11	Taman Rajo	309.00	^{(e)}	13,164	14,200	Kemingking Dalam	10	36383
15.05.01	Jambi Luar Kota ("Jambi outside the city")	273.43	58,380	69,835	75,500	Pijoan	20 ^{(f)}	36361 ^{(g)}
15.05.02	Sekernan	567.74	39,754	45,330	47,600	Sengeti	16 ^{(h)}	36381
	Totals	5,158.14	342,952	390,347	430,246	Sengeti	155	

Note: (a) includes the kelurahan of Tempino. (b) The 2010 population of the new Bahar Selatan and Bahar Utara districts are included with that of the existing Sungai Bahar District in the far southwest of the regency, from which they were cut out.
(c) includes the kelurahan of Tanjung. (d) includes the kelurahan of Jambi Kecil.
(e) The 2010 population of the new Taman Rajo District is included with that of the existing Maro Sebo District, from which it was cut out. (f) includes the kelurahan of Pijoan.
(g) except the village (desa) of Maro Sebo, which has a post code of 36382. (h) includes the kelurahan of Sengeti.

While Jambi Luar Kota District includes the western suburbs of Jambi city, five other districts immediately adjoin the city on its other sides, notably Taman Rajo District to its northeast, Kumpeh Ulu District to its east, Sungai Gelam District to its southeast and Mestong District to its south, while the Batang Hari River borders the city on its north side, separating it from Maro Sebo District. The Sungai Bahar, Bahar Selatan and Bahar Utara Districts together form a salient to the southwest of the regency. Sekernan District similarly forms a salient to the northwest of the regency, while the remaining district - Kumpeh - is a large but sparely-populated area in the east.

== Archaeology ==
Located within this regency, the Muaro Jambi Temple Compounds is one of the largest archaeological complex in Sumatra. The archaeological site is located some 22 km downstream from the modern capital, on the opposite bank of the Batang Hari River. It has the ancient Hindu Candi and Menapo or brick-built temples and canals. The restoration of the three main structures Candi Tinggi, Candi Gumpung and Candi Kedaton, the last with an unusual fill of small white river pebbles, has been completed.

== See also ==
- Dharmakīrtiśrī
