= List of World Heritage Sites in Malaysia =

Location of UNESCO World Heritage Sites in Malaysia

The United Nations Educational, Scientific and Cultural Organization (UNESCO) World Heritage Sites are places of importance to cultural or natural heritage as described in the UNESCO World Heritage Convention, established in 1972. Cultural heritage consists of monuments (such as architectural works, monumental sculptures, or inscriptions), groups of buildings, and sites (including archaeological sites). Natural heritage consists of natural features (physical and biological formations), geological and physiographical formations (including habitats of threatened species of animals and plants), and natural sites which are important from the point of view of science, conservation, or natural beauty. Malaysia ratified the convention on 7 December 1988.

Malaysia has six sites on the list. The first two sites, Gunung Mulu National Park and Kinabalu Park, were listed in 2000. The site Historic Cities of the Straits of Malacca was listed in 2008, the Archaeological Heritage of the Lenggong Valley was listed in 2012, the Archaeological Heritage of Niah National Park's Caves Complex was listed in 2024, and the most recent one, the Forest Research Institute Malaysia Forest Park Selangor was listed in 2025. The two sites listed in 2000 are natural while the other four are cultural. In addition, there are four sites on the tentative list. Malaysia served as a member of the World Heritage Committee from 2011 to 2015.

== World Heritage Sites ==
UNESCO lists sites under ten criteria; each entry must meet at least one of the criteria. Criteria i through vi are cultural, and vii through x are natural.

World Heritage Sites
| Site | Image | Location (state) | Year listed | UNESCO data | Description |
|---|---|---|---|---|---|
| Kinabalu Park | Mountain with a rocky top and forested slopes. There is a narrow high waterfall on one side of the mountain slope. | Sabah | 2000 | 1012; ix, x (natural) | The national park is located in the area of Malaysia's highest mountain Mount Kinabalu (4,095 m (13,435 ft)). The area is rich in biodiversity, as habitats along the slopes of the mountain change from a lowland tropical rainforest to sub-alpine forests and shrublands at higher elevations. Due to steep mountain slopes, these habitats are isolated from one another even if they are close in distance. There are about a thousand orchid species, 78 species of Ficus, and 60 species of ferns. |
| Gunung Mulu National Park | Limestone pinnacles in a foggy tropical forest | Sarawak | 2000 | 1013; vii, viii, ix, x (natural) | The park covers a tropical karst area that is important due to both its geological features and exceptionally high biodiversity. The karst formations include numerous caves, canyons, escarpments, and limestone pinnacles (pictured). Sarawak Chamber is the largest cave chamber in the world. In view of flora and fauna, the park comprises 17 vegetation zones spanning over 2,000 m (6,600 ft) in altitude. It is home to 109 species of palms. The caves are home to large colonies of bats and birds, such as the wrinkle-lipped free-tailed bat and cave swiftlets. |
| Melaka and George Town, Historic Cities of the Straits of Malacca | Town scene with three-storied red houses and a red church. There is a three-storied clock tower standing on a square. | Malacca, Penang | 2008 | 1223; ii, iii, iv (cultural) | This site comprises two important colonial cities at the Strait of Malacca, an important trade route connecting China with Europe, Middle East, and the Indian subcontinent. Centuries of cultural interchange have created unique architecture and culture in these two cities. Malacca (pictured), a town of the 15th-century Malacca Sultanate, was under the influence of Dutch and Portuguese Empires starting in the early 16th century. George Town was shaped by the British Empire at the end of the 18th century. |
| Archaeological Heritage of the Lenggong Valley | Valley with road, forest on both sides | Perak | 2012 | 1396; iii, iv (cultural) | This site contains two clusters of archaeological sites that cover one of the longest culture sequences in a single locality in the world. Excavations in caves and open-air sites have produced remains of stone tool workshops, with 1.83 million-year-old hand axes being among the oldest such tools discovered outside Africa. Other sites date to the Paleolithic and Neolithic periods, and the most recent remains are from around 1700 years ago. Perak Man, discovered in one of the caves and dated to be about 10,000 years old, is one of the most complete human skeletons from this period found in the region. |
| Archaeological Heritage of Niah National Park's Caves Complex | The main entrance to the Niah Caves at sunset | Sarawak | 2024 | 1014; iii, v (cultural) | The Niah Caves were first studied by Alfred Russel Wallace in 1864. Subsequent excavations have uncovered evidence of continuous human occupation during the late Pleistocene and early Holocene, as well as the remains of some of the oldest anatomically modern humans outside Africa, between 35,000 and 40,000 years old. The findings have been linked to the transition between foraging and farming lifestyles of the people who lived there. From the natural perspective, the area around the caves is covered by rainforest and tidal swamp forest. |
| FRIM Selangor Forest Park | Canopy view from below | Selangor | 2025 | 1734; ii, v (cultural) | Selangor Forest Park is a man-made tropical rainforest, which was created in an area heavily degraded by tin mining and agriculture. The reforestation initiative commenced in the 1920s, with gradual expansion of the buffer zone since the 1970s. The forest demonstrates that a reforestation of a degraded area is possible within a human lifetime, with biodiversity now reaching or exceeding that in the pristine forests of the region. |

== Tentative list ==
In addition to sites inscribed on the World Heritage List, member states can maintain a list of tentative sites that they may consider for nomination. Nominations for the World Heritage List are only accepted if the site was previously listed on the tentative list. Malaysia lists four properties on its tentative list.

Tentative sites
| Site | Image | Location (state) | Year listed | UNESCO criteria | Description |
|---|---|---|---|---|---|
| National Park (Taman Negara) of Peninsular Malaysia | Rainforest and a river | Pahang, Kelantan, Terengganu | 2014 | ix, x (natural) | Taman Negara is the oldest (founded in 1938–39) and the largest national park in Malaysia. It covers diverse ecosystems such as lowland tropical rainforests and mountains, and is rich in flora and fauna. Many animal and plant species are endemic or vulnerable. Among large mammals, the park is home to Asian elephant, Malayan tiger, clouded leopard, and gaur. |
| Gombak Selangor Quartz Ridge | Mountain peak, forest in front | Gombak, Selangor | 2017 | vii (natural) | This nomination comprises a massive quartz dyke, a geological formation that formed when magma, forcing itself through a granite fissure, crystallized into various forms of quartz minerals about 200 million years ago. Subsequent weathering has created pseudo-karst forms such as domes, tables, ramps, and towers. The formation is about 14 km (8.7 mi) long and 200 m (660 ft) wide. |
| Royal Belum State Park | Lake surrounded by tropical forest | Perak | 2017 | x (natural) | The state park covers lowland and hill dipterocarp forests and lower montane forests. The area is rich in biodiversity both in plant and animal species. Three species of the giant-flower plant Rafflesia are found in the park, as well as several endangered mammal species, including Malayan tiger, gaur, Malayan tapir, and Asian elephant. There are also ten hornbill species. |
| Sungai Buloh Leprosarium | National Leprosy Control Centre (NLCC) | Selangor | 2019 | ii, iv, v, vi (cultural) | Sungai Buloh, founded in 1930, was the largest leper colony of the British Empire, with over 2,400 patients at its peak. The settlement was designed as a self-sustained community, with infrastructure allowing the patients to live as close to normal as possible. It contained cultural and communal buildings, as well as places of worship for different faiths in a multicultural community. It was one of the key medical research centers for leprosy of the 20th century. |

== See also ==
- List of Intangible Cultural Heritage elements in Malaysia
- Tourism in Malaysia
