= Bawbawgyi Pagoda =

Buddhist Pagoda in Bago, Myanmar

- ဘောဘောကြီး စေတီ
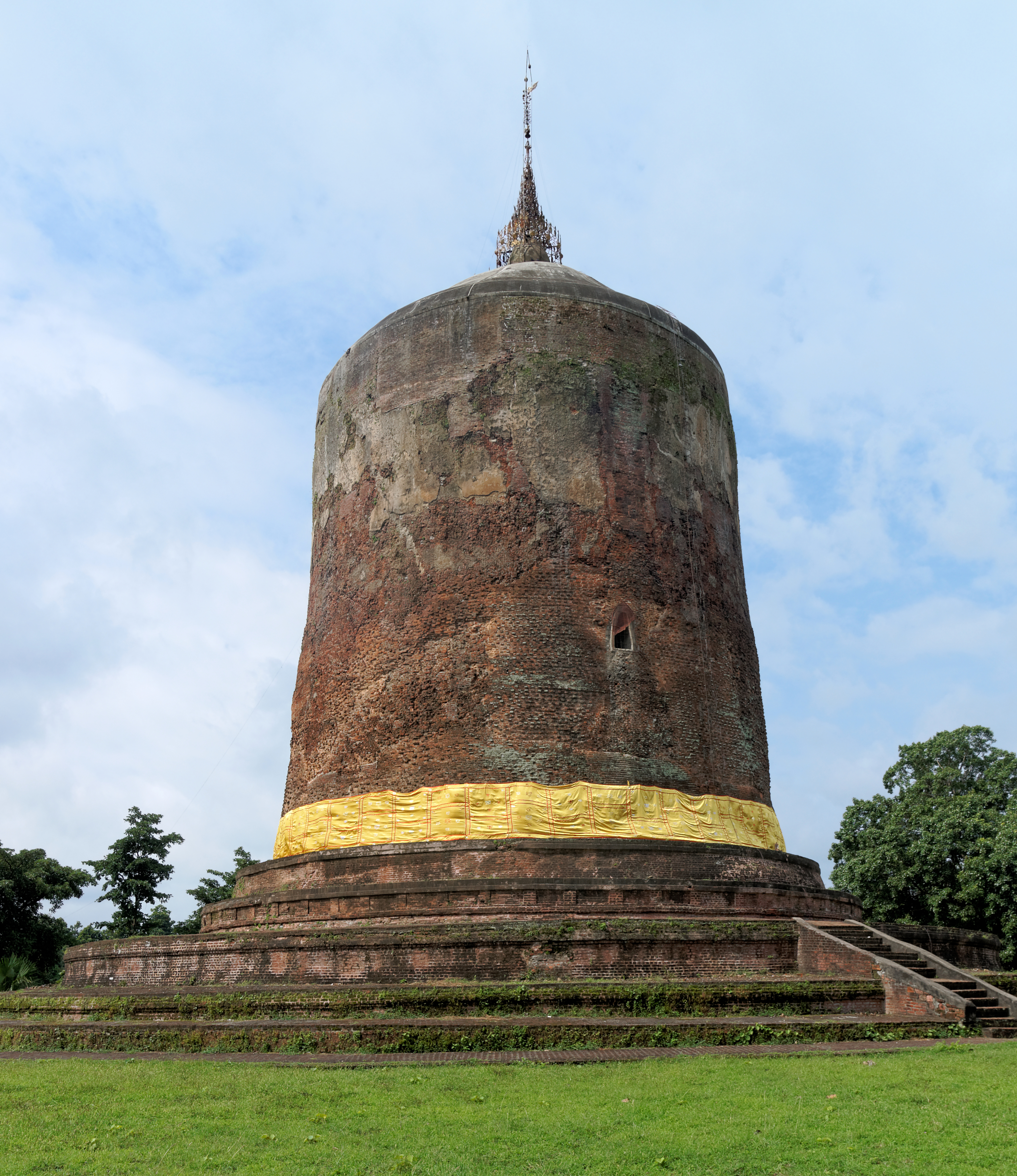
- Bawbawgyi Pagoda

- Location within Myanmar

Religion
- Affiliation: Buddhism

Location
- Location: Sri Ksetra, Pyay District, Bago Region
- Country: Myanmar
- Coordinates: 18°47′10″N 95°17′08″E

Architecture
- Height (max): 46.63 m (153.0 ft)

Bawbawgyi Pagoda (Burmese: ဘောဘောကြီး စေတီ) is a Buddhist stupa and one of the oldest Buddhist structures in the history of ancient edifices in Myanmar, located in the Sri Ksetra Archaeological Zone north of the city of Pyay. The stupa was constructed during the Pyu period in the 5th century and is in excellent structural condition, having miraculously survived a number of major earthquakes over the preceding centuries. The history of this stupa is unknown as no stone inscription has been found.

== History ==
Of uncertain age, the stupa was likely built between the 5th and the 6th centuries when the Pyu people commanded the circular city immediately to the north. Despite its antiquity, the pagoda is in excellent structural condition, having miraculously survived a number of major earthquakes over the preceding centuries.

== Architecture ==
The Bawbawgyi Pagoda has a largely cylindrical body, topped by a conical drum, crowned by a hti ("umbrella"). The overall structure is 46.6 m (153 ft) tall, and consists of:

- five terraces, 8 m (26 ft)
- the cylindrical body, 22.3 m (73 ft)
- the conical drum, 7.3 m (24 ft)
- the amalaka, 1.53 m (5 ft 0 in)
- the hti, 7.5 m (25 ft)

Like some stupas in Bagan, the pagoda's main body encloses a long hollow section, 3.1 m (10 ft) in diameter and 24.3 m (80 ft) in height.

== Bibliography ==
- Marshall, J.H.; Taw, Sein Ko (1908). "Archaeological Exploration in India, 1907–08: Prome". Journal of the Royal Asiatic Society of Great Britain and Ireland. 61. London: The Royal Asiatic Society: 1115–1118.
