= Pakhangyi Monastery =

Buddhist monastery in Myanmar

Pakhangyi Monastery Kyaungdawgyi
- ပခန်းကြီးကျောင်း

Religion
- Affiliation: Theravada Buddhism

Location
- Country: Yesagyo Township, Magway Region, Burma
- Interactive map of Pakhangyi Monastery; Kyaungdawgyi
- Coordinates: 21.535643°N 95.198981°E

Architecture
- Founder: Pho Toke and Daw Phae
- Completed: 1868; 158 years ago

Pakhangyi Monastery (Burmese: ပခန်းကြီးကျောင်း), officially known as Kyaungdawgyi (ကျောင်းတော်ကြီး) is a Buddhist monastery in Yesagyo Township, Magway Region, Myanmar (Burma). Pakhangyi Monastery was built during the Konbaung dynasty in the late 18th century. The wooden monastery was built by Pho Toke and Daw Phae, using 254 teak pillars that range from 50–90 inches (1,300–2,300 mm) each in height. The monastery was restored in 1992, In 1996, the Burmese government submitted the monastery, along with other exemplars from the Konbaung dynasty for inclusion into the UNESCO World Heritage List.

== See also ==
- Kyaung
