= Bawomataluo village =

Village in Indonesia

Coordinates: 0.6170°N 97.7870°E

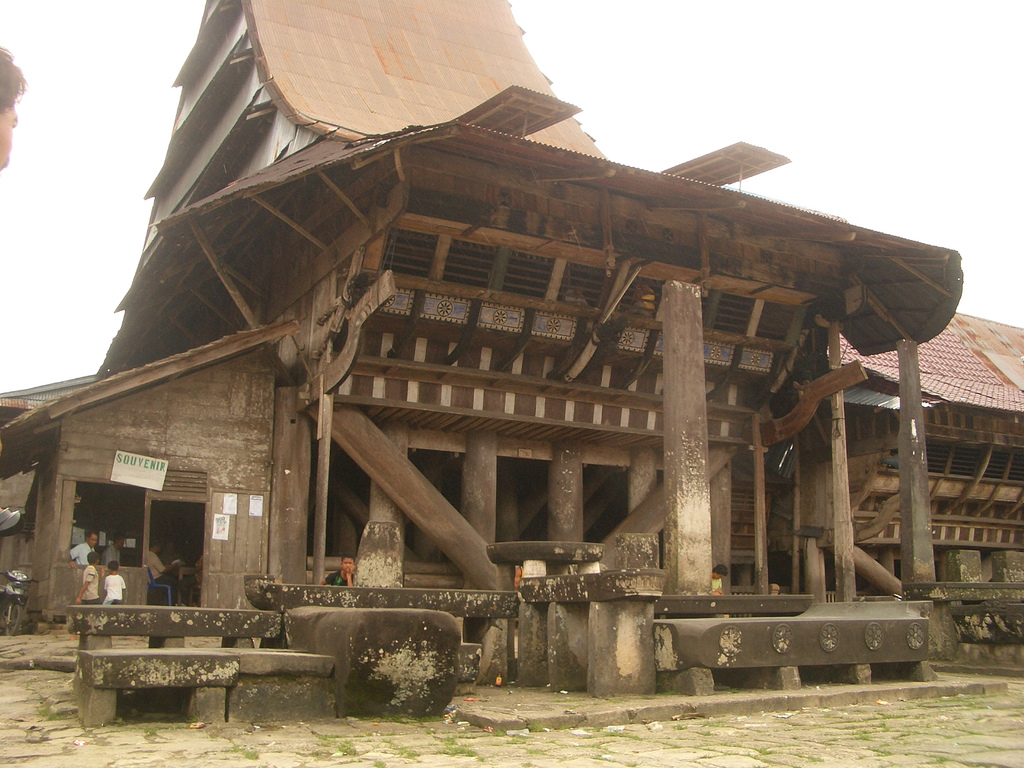
A traditional house at the Bawomataluo site

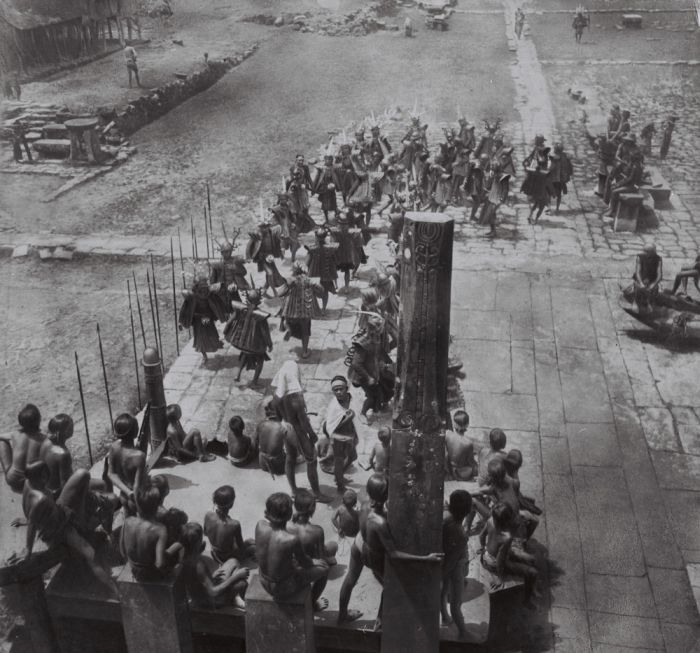
People and a group of warriors in full regalia at the stone tables in the village square during a civic celebration at Bawomataloewo on Nias

Bawomataluo village is a settlement in the Teluk Dalam province of the South Nias Regency of Indonesia. The village is built on a flat-topped hill, the name Bawomataluo meaning "Sun Hill", and is one of the best-preserved villages built in traditional style. The largest house is that of the chief and is believed to date back to the eighteenth century. Large stone slabs stand in front of the houses and an open space in the centre of the village is used for traditional ceremonies and rituals.

In view of the original traditional architectural features of the settlement and its environment representing the megalithic monuments tradition, the site was included on Indonesia's national Tentative List for nomination as a World Heritage Site under Criteria (i), (iv), and (vi) in 2009.

== Location ==
The Bawomataluo settlement on the island of Nias is located on a hill on a level ground about 400 metres (1,300 ft) above mean sea level and is accessed by concrete steps. The hill is oriented in the southeast to the northwest direction. It covers an area of about 5 hectares (12 acres). It is 4 kilometres (2.5 mi) from the sea coast and is above the height likely to be reached by any tsunami. The settlement is planned to fit the topography of the land and a spring provides adequate supplies of water. It is surrounded by "valleys and deep gorges". The settlement is 15 kilometres (9.3 mi) away from Teluk Dalam port, a sub-district of the Nias, and public transport facility is available to reach the site.

== History ==
According to the family history traced to the 18th century settlement at Bawomataluo, the design of houses is credited to King Laowo who established the Kingdom in the region whose antecedence was to the Gomo family. The houses were built by Saonigeho (Siliwu Gere) who belonged to the same Laowo family. As of 2009, the fourth line of descendants of the Laowo family are residing in the settlement.

== Features ==
The settlement is built around the megalithic monuments positioned in vertical and horizontal directions. These are locally called the daro-daro and the naitaro respectively. Daro-daro represents males and naitaro represents females. The funerary site where the stones are found is on a terraced land which is approached by climbing 7 stone steps in the first stage and 70 steps at the second stage (a total of 80 steps is also mentioned). Also located here is a stone feature in the open area which is part of the customary rituals.

Two stone paved roads are aligned on either side of the megalithic stones, each of which runs for about 300 metres (980 ft), terminating at the house of the Chief or King of the community, at the southwestern end of the settlement; the house measures 19 by 30 metres (62 ft × 98 ft) . This house is said to be the "oldest and largest on Nias". The house is built with large sized wooden beams in the interior. There is a drum in the house which is used to signal the start and end of meetings. Another notable feature in the house is of carvings in wood and an array of jaw bones of pigs. A large stone throne at the entry to the house is used by the Chief; by its side there is a depiction of a phallus carved out of stone. Outside the Chief's house there are stone tables where dead bodies used to be kept to rot.

The earliest traditionally built houses for the people of the settlement are located on both sides of the road, facing each other at a space of 4 metres (13 ft). New houses have also been built in between the traditional houses which also face each other, and are in a straight line aligned in the northwest to the northeast direction. In addition, there are houses built at the center of the settlement which are in a row oriented towards the southeast. The entire complex consists of 500 houses, each with a household head, housing a population of 7,000. Apart from the size of the houses (omo hada) and a feature at its entrance to denote the status of the family, each house has a symbolic representation of the status of the head of the family. Houses are made of carved wood and reflects the skill of the local people in wood crafting.

Training of people of the village for wars was performed in the past by jumping a stone wall of 1.8 metres (5 ft 11 in) in height, which was fixed with sharp-edged sticks at the top. However, in the present practice the sharp-edged sticks are removed for ceremonial jumping. This jumping is also performed for financial considerations outside of ceremonial events. The cultural activity at the settlement is in the form of war dances by young men.

== Bibliography ==
- Dumarçay, Jacques (1987). The House in South-East Asia. Oxford University Press. ISBN 978-0-19-582690-6.
- Harssel, Jan van; Jackson, Richard H (23 January 2014). National Geographic Learning's Visual Geography of Travel and Tourism. Lloyd E. Hudman. Cengage Learning. ISBN 978-1-133-95126-1.
- Paz, Octavio; Barbier, Jean Paul (2000). Ritual arts of the New World: Pre-Columbian America. Museu Barbier-Mueller Art Precolombí. Skira. ISBN 978-88-8118-326-5.
