= Muaro Jambi Temple Compounds =

Ancient Buddhist temples in Indonesia

Muaro Jambi
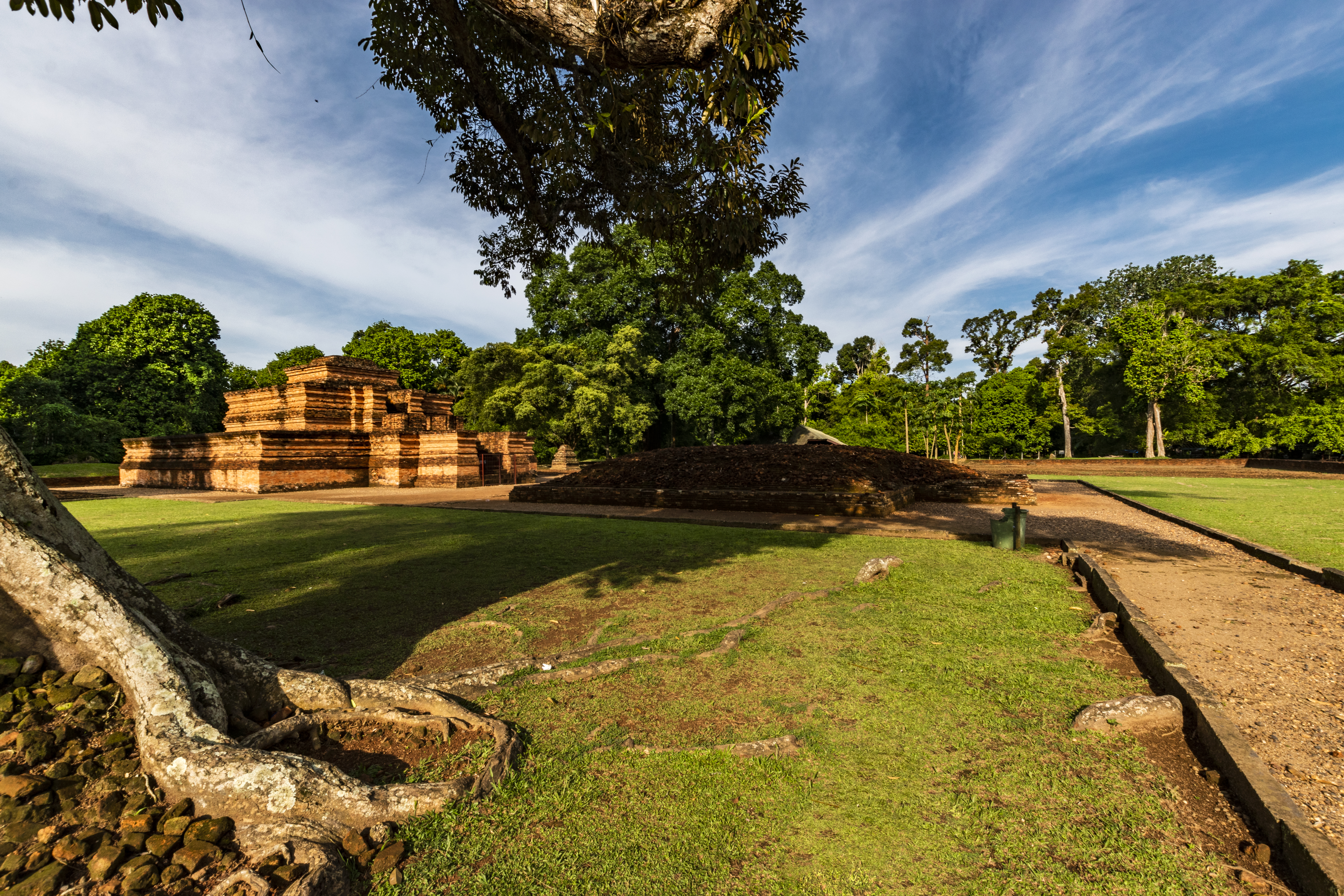
- Muaro Jambi temple compounds.
- Interactive map of Muaro Jambi
- 1.4779213°S 103.6670838°E
- Periods: Hindu-Buddhist period
- Cultures: Srivijaya
- Location: Muaro Jambi Regency, Jambi, Indonesia
- Region: Southeast Asia

History
- Built: c. 7th century CE
- Abandoned: c. 1278 CE

Site notes
- Architectural style: Buddhist Candi
- Excavation dates: 1824
- Archaeologists: S.C. Crooke
- Condition: partially ruined

Muaro Jambi (Indonesian: Candi Muaro Jambi) is a Buddhist temple complex, in Muaro Jambi Regency, Jambi province, Sumatra, Indonesia. It is situated 26 kilometres (16 mi) east from the city of Jambi. The temple complex was built by the Melayu Kingdom, with its surviving temples and other archaeological remains estimated to date from the 7th to 13th century CE. The archaeological site includes eight excavated temple sanctuaries and covers about 12 square kilometres (4.6 sq mi), stretches 7.5 kilometres (4.7 mi) along the Batang Hari River, 80 menapos or mounds of temple ruins, are not yet restored. It is one of the largest and best-preserved ancient temple complexes in South East Asia.

It was suggested that Muaro Jambi Temple compound might be the initial location of Srivijaya kingdom. This is mainly because, Muaro Jambi has far richer temple concentration—in contrast to the scarcity of archaeological sites in South Sumatra.

== History ==
The start of the rise of the kingdom of Melayu can be dated to 1025 when Indian kingdom of Chola attacked and destroyed the capital of the Sumatran maritime empire of Srivijaya. This allowed a number of smaller Sumatran polities to expand their political and economic influence. During the twelfth and thirteenth centuries it seems that from its river estuarine basis along the Batang Hari, Melayu became the dominant economic power in Sumatra. Muaro Jambi is estimated to have been built somewhere around 7th to 12th century CE, and the substantial archaeological remains suggest that this temple compound may have been the site of the Melayu capital. The city's age of glory came to an end in 1278 when Java's Singhasari kingdom attacked the city, even succeeding in capturing members of the royal family. The site was rediscovered by British soldier, S.C. Crooke in 1824. It is now protected as a national monument.

== Design and structures ==
The temple complex of Candi Muaro Jambi is spread out over a large area along the banks of the Batang Hari River. Eight temple complexes have been excavated but many more mounds and sites remain to be explored within the conservation area, much of which is still covered by thick jungle. The three most significant intact temples are known as Candi Tinggi, Candi Kedaton, and Candi Gumpung. The temples are built from red brick and unlike the temples of Java, feature very little ornamentation, carving, or statuary. A few pieces of sculpture are housed in a small, on-site museum. The wooden dwellings that are believed to have housed the city's population have all disappeared without a trace. Only 9 temples have been restored, 3 have mentioned above and the others are Candi Tinggi I, Candi Kembarbatu, Candi Gedong I, and Candi Gedong II.

=== Gallery ===
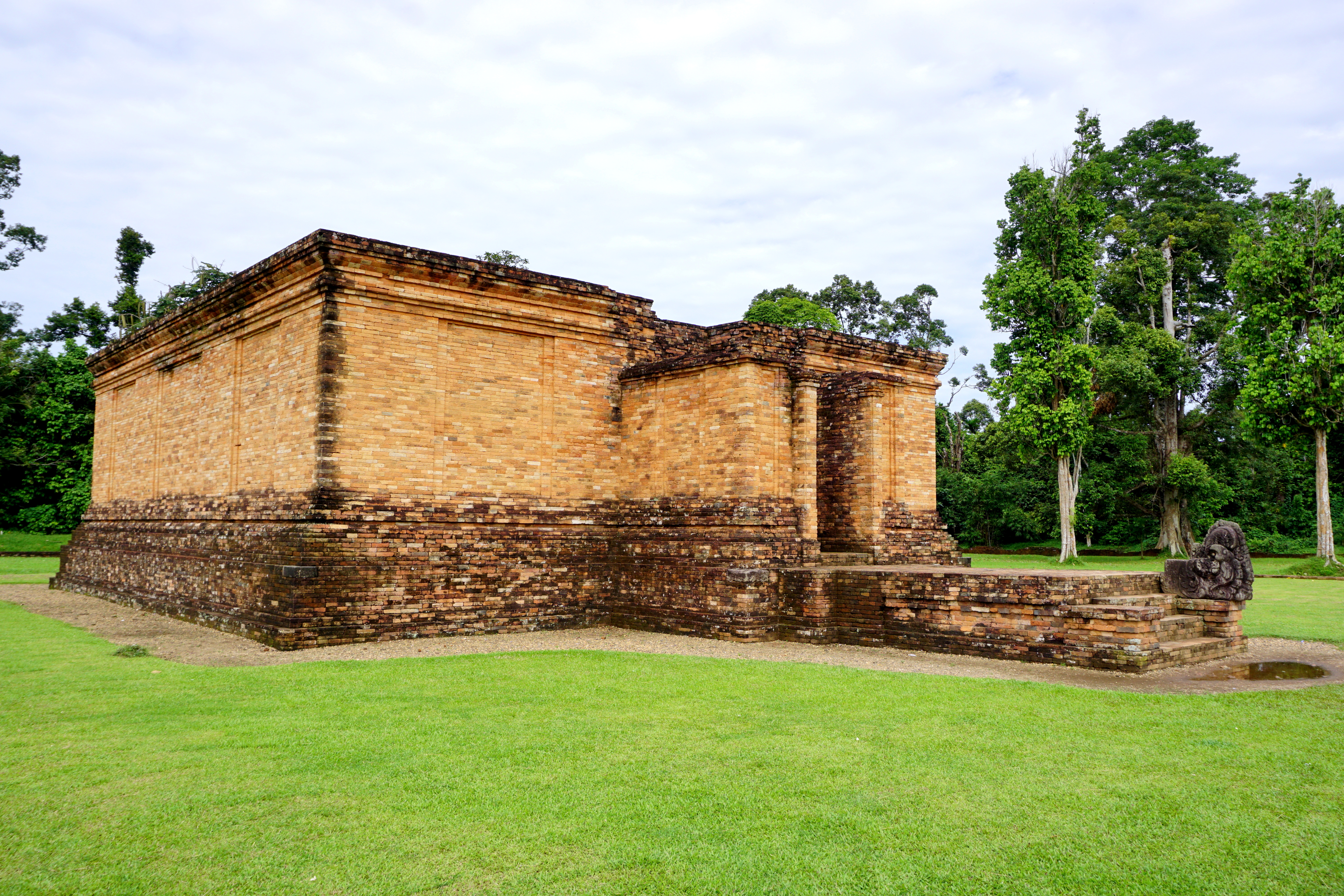
Candi Gumpung, a Buddhist temple at Muaro Jambi of Malayu Kingdom

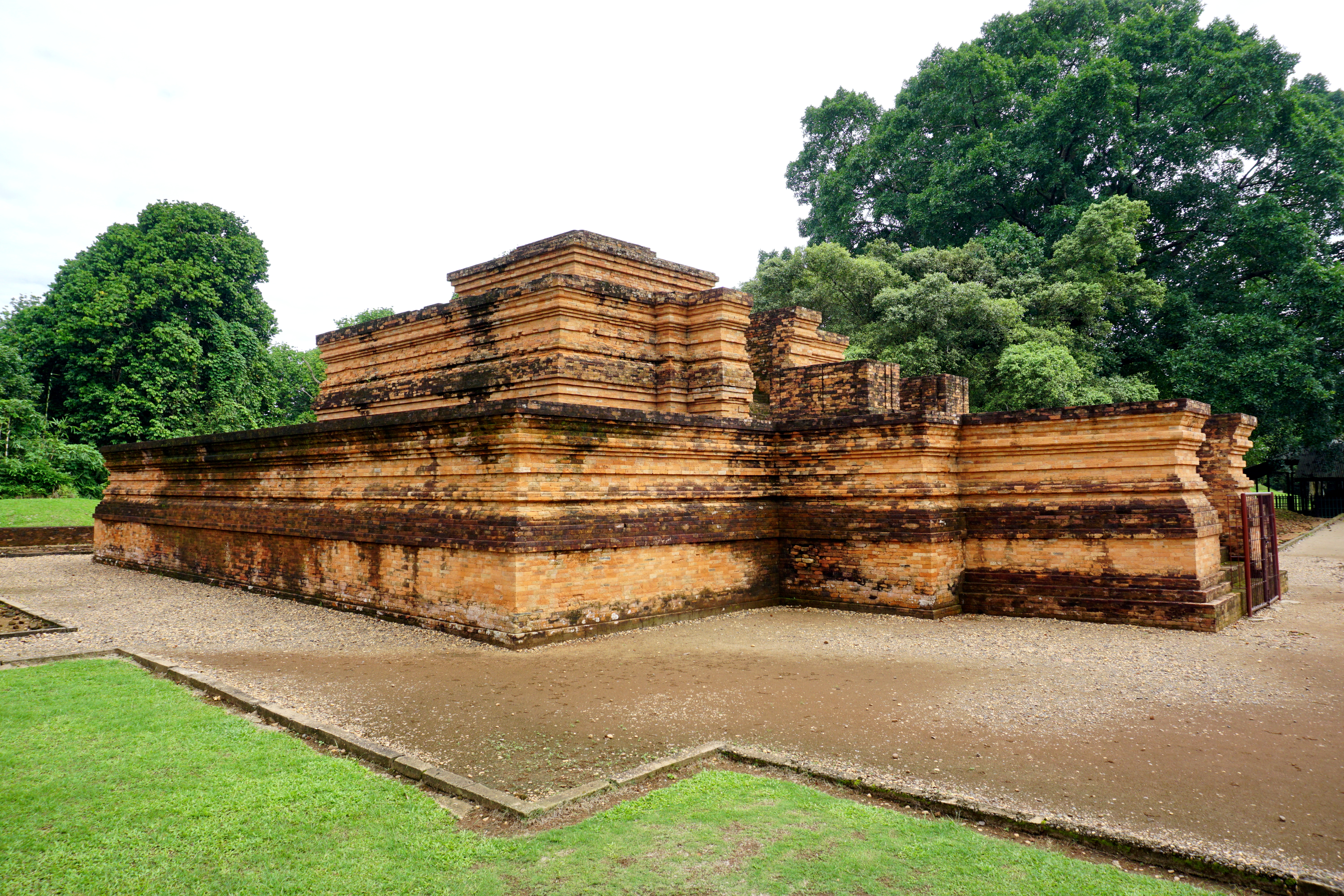
Candi Tinggi, one of the temple within Muaro Jambi temple compound.

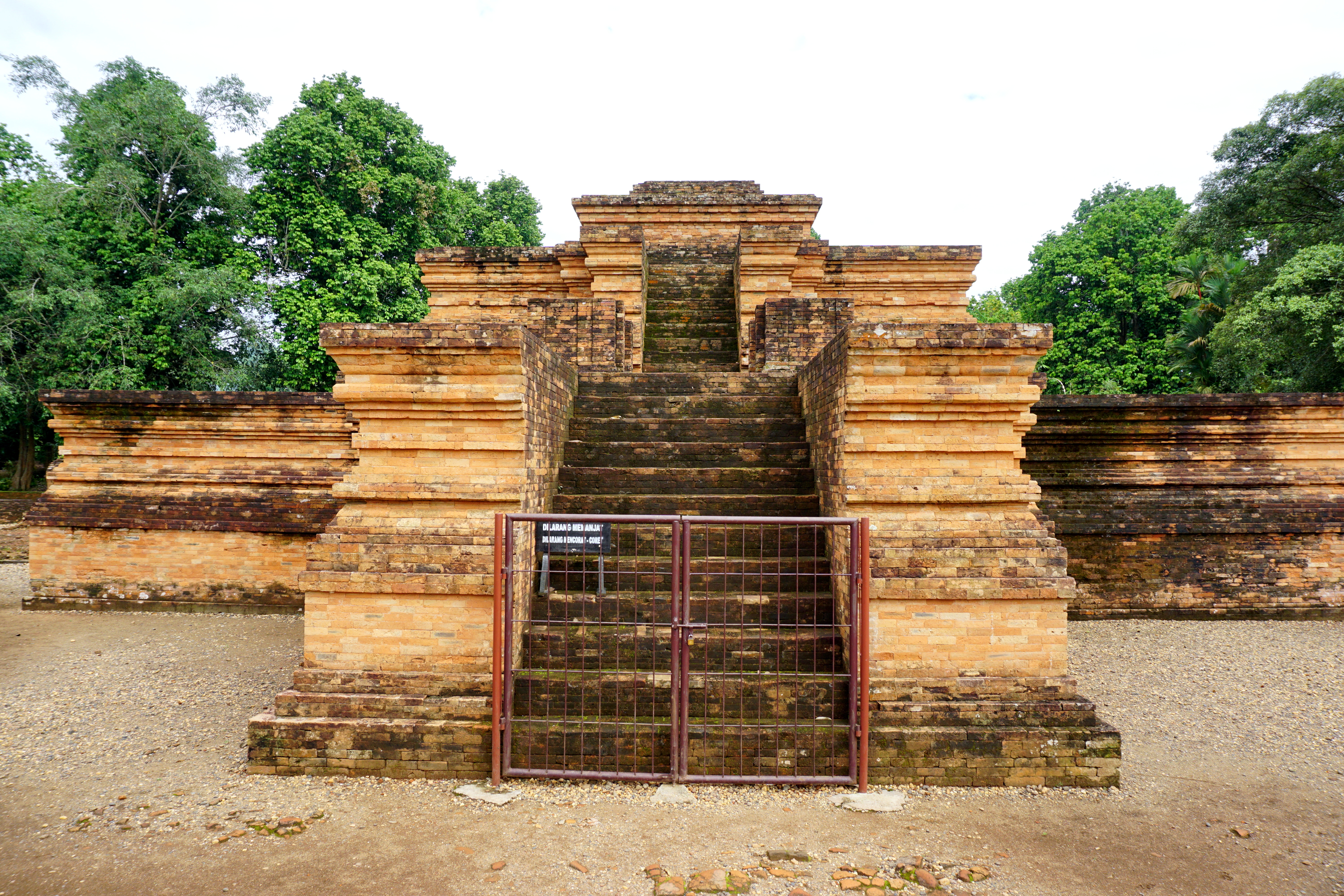
Candi Tinggi.

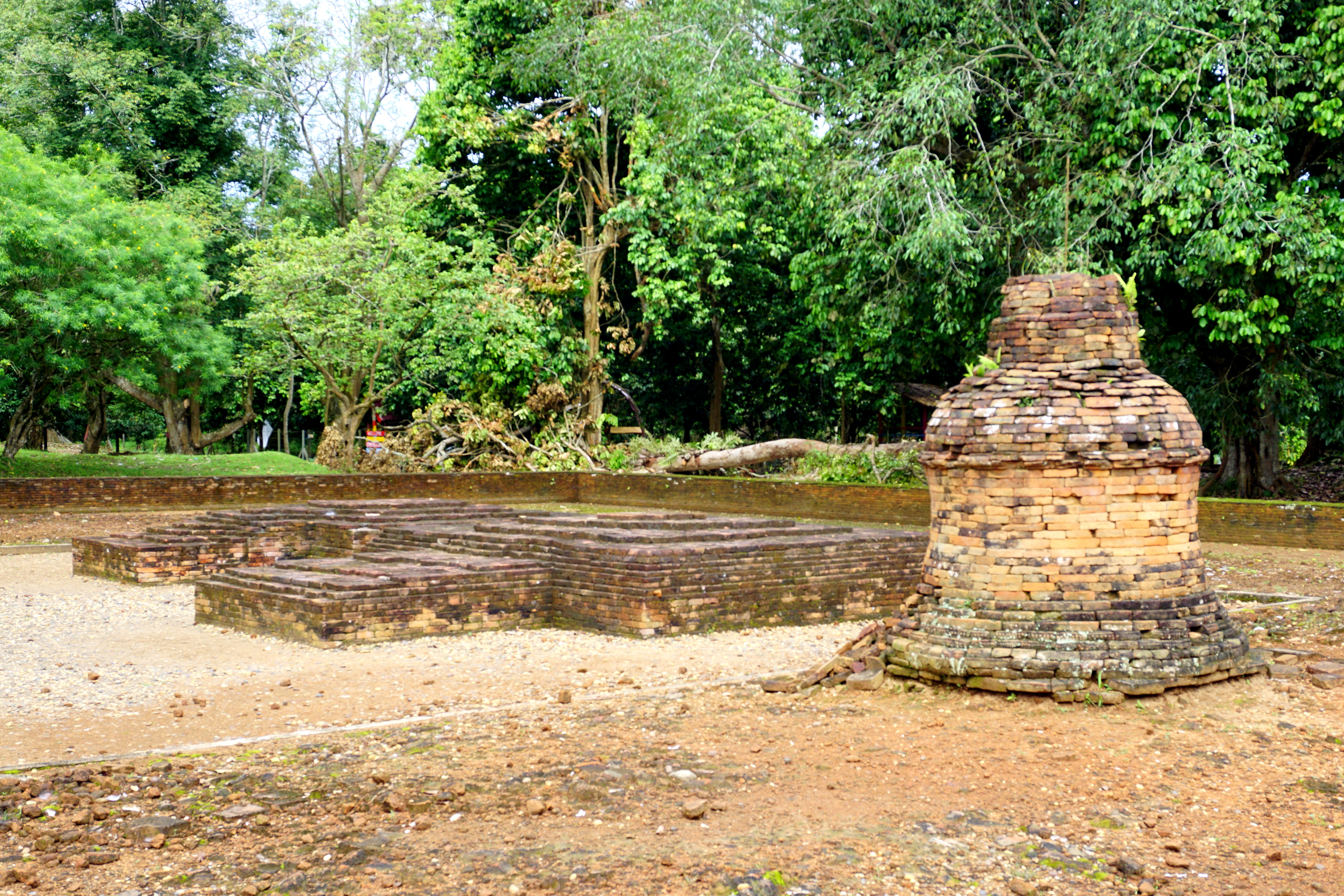
Stupa of Candi Tinggi.

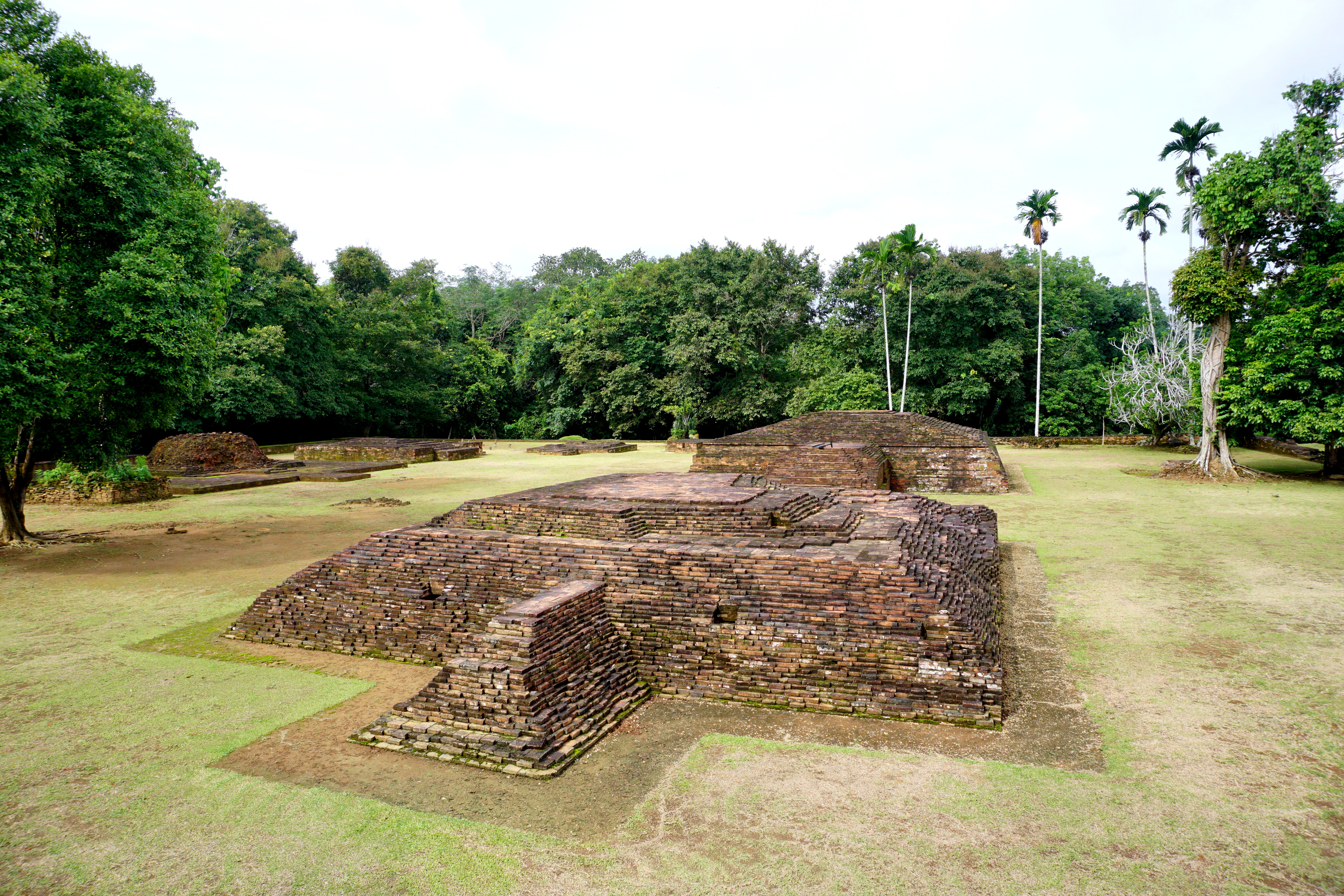
Candi Kembar Batu.

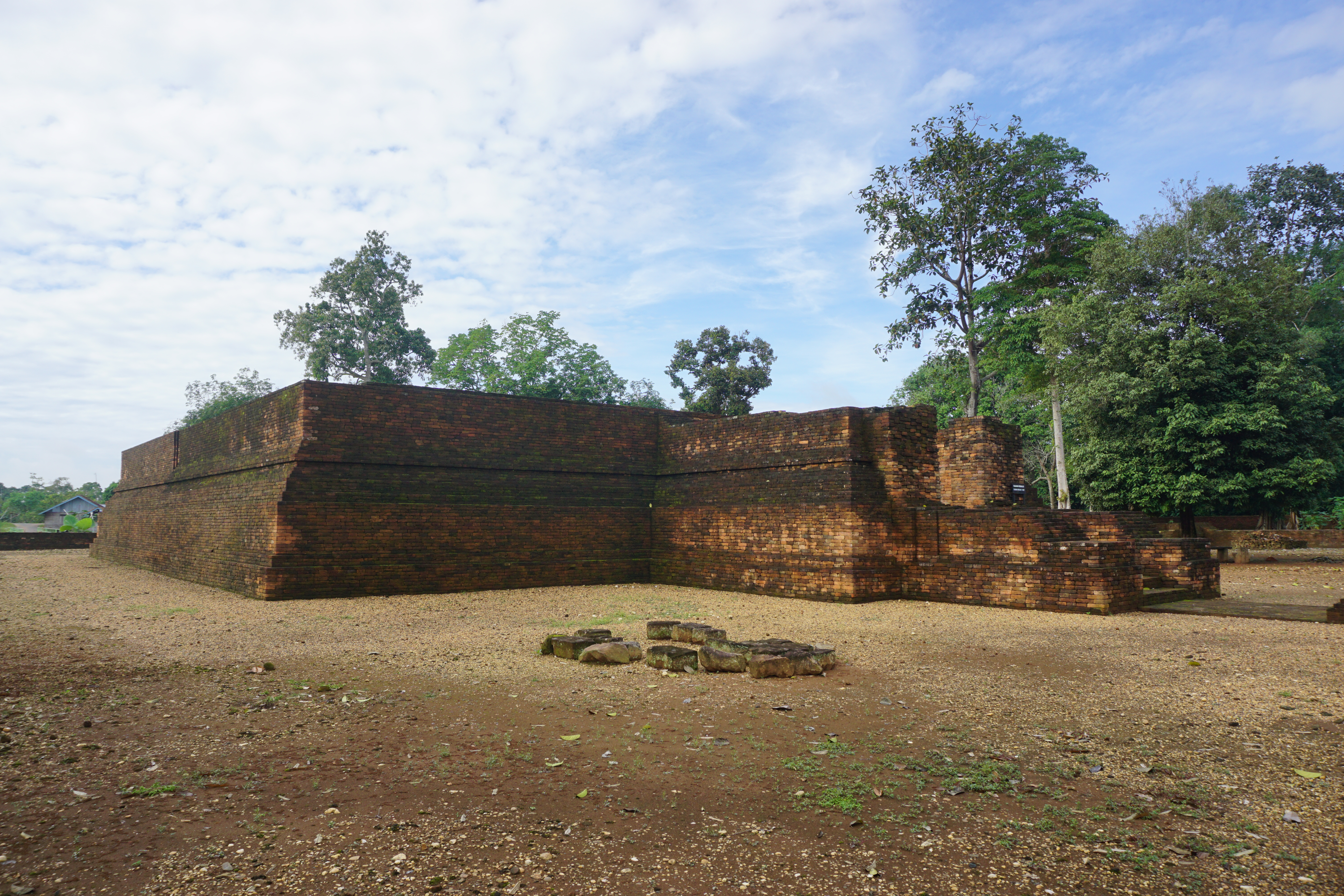
Candi Kedaton.

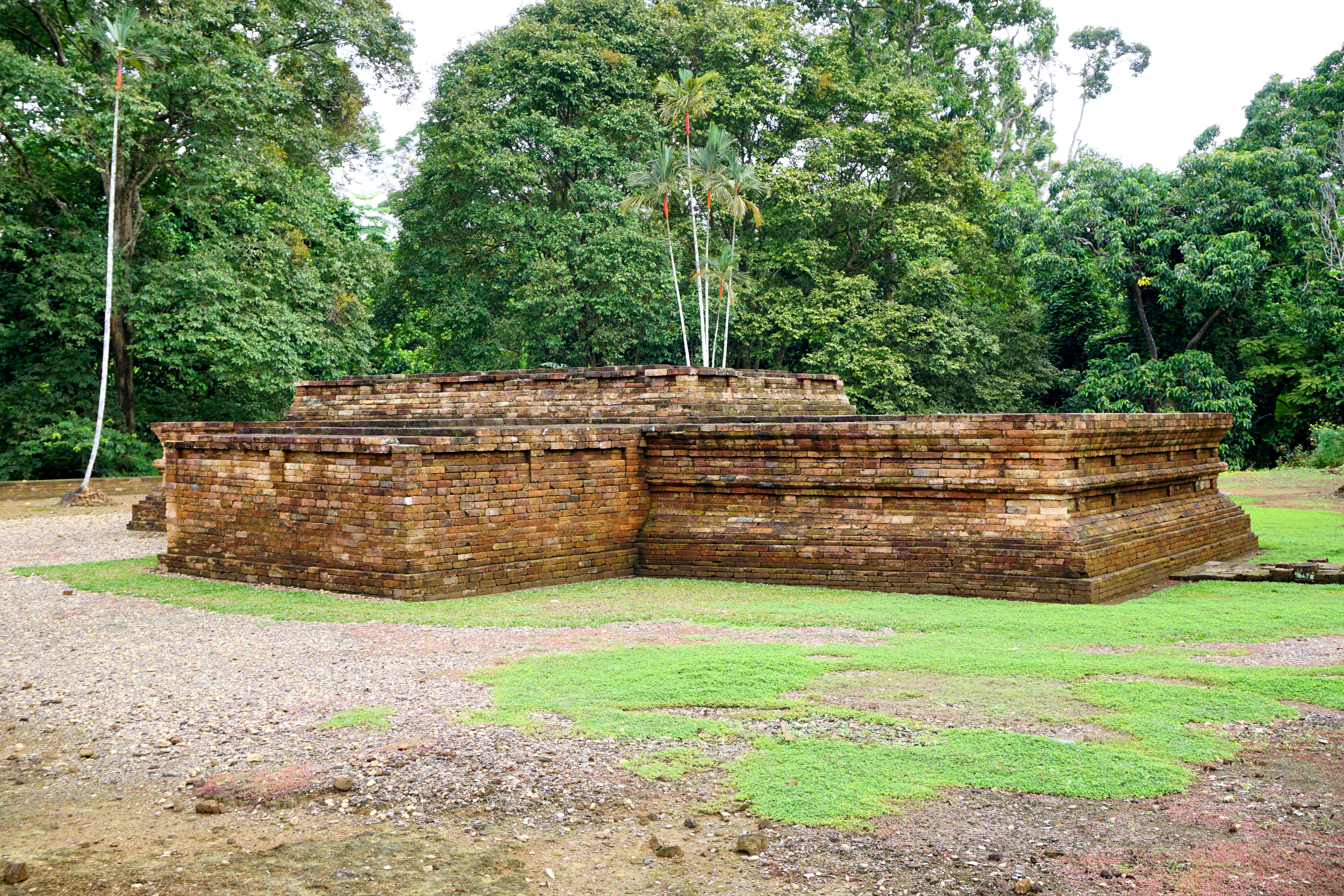
Candi Astano.

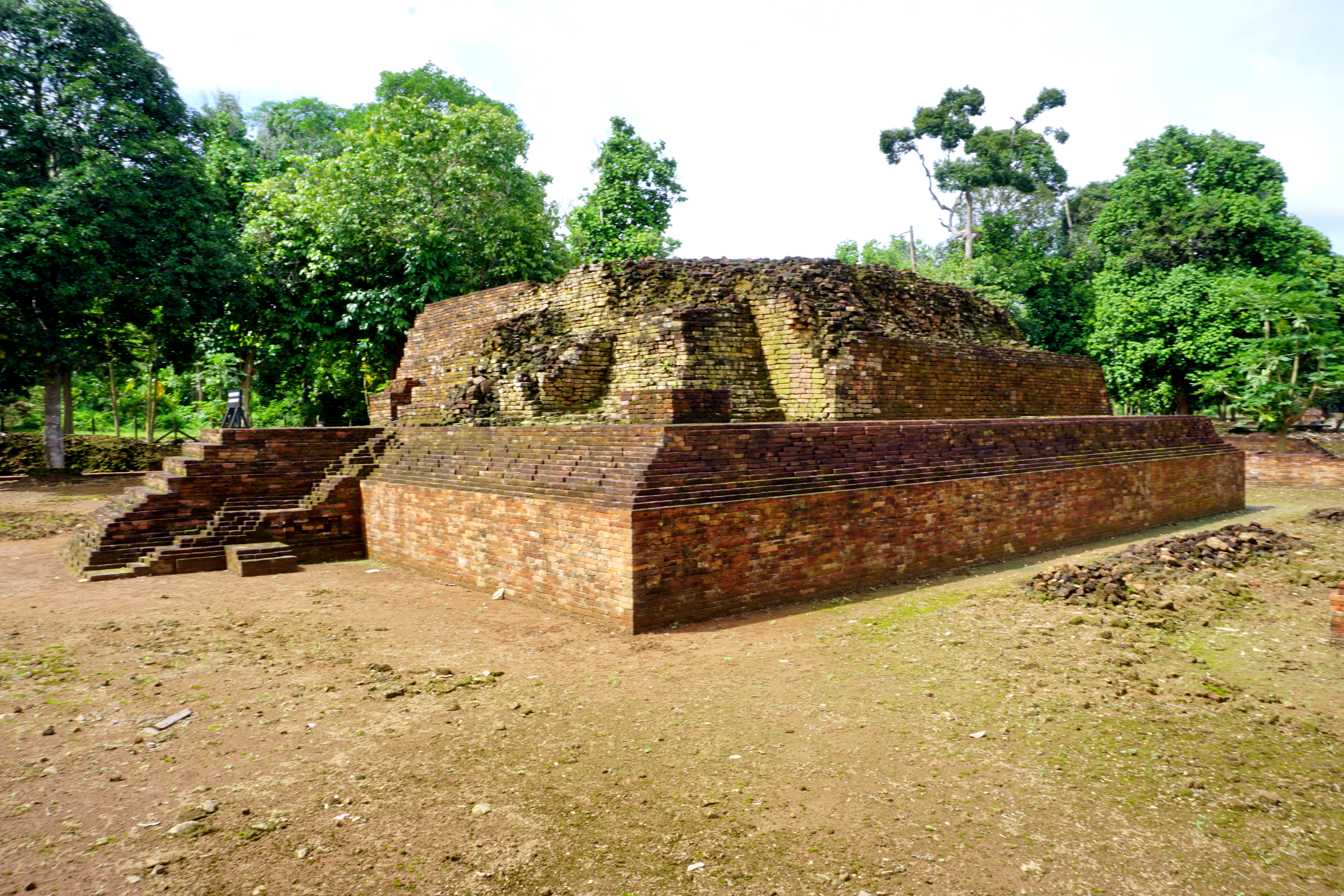
Candi Gedong 1.

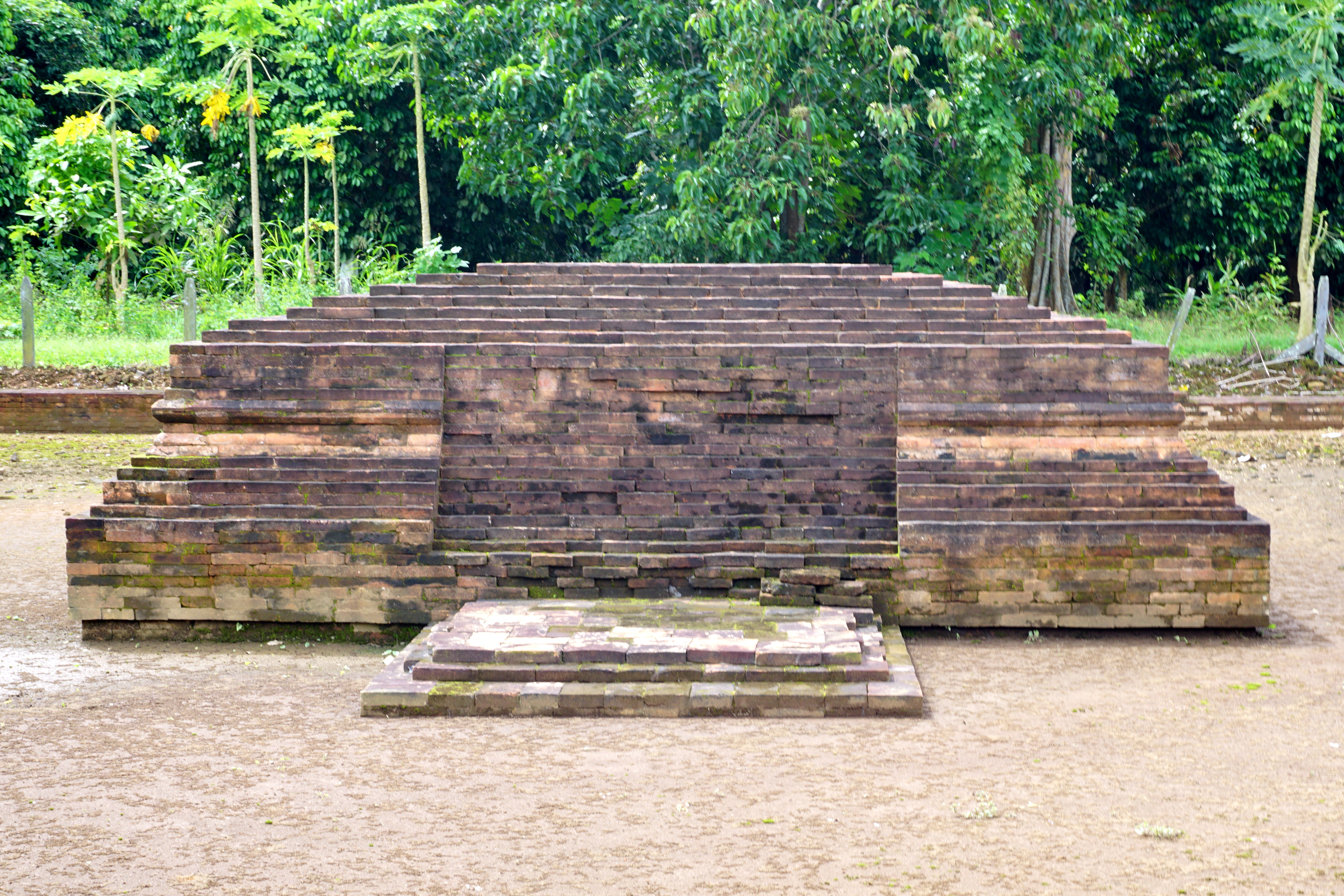
Candi Gedong 2.

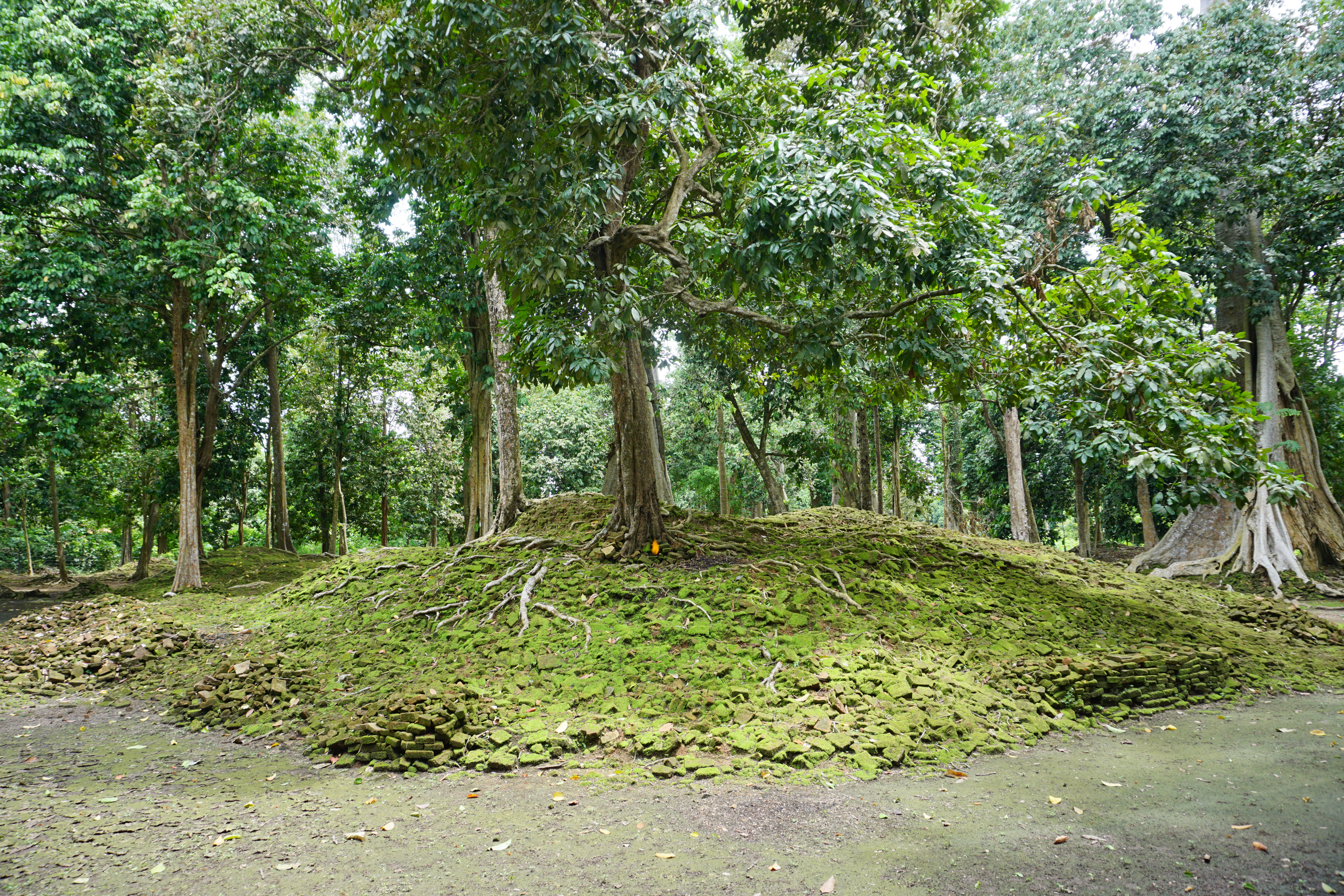
Trees above the ruins of Candi Koto Mahligai

== See also ==
- Candi of Indonesia
