= ISUP =

ISUP may refer to:

- Paris Institute of Statistics, a school for statistics in France
- ISDN User Part or ISUP, a feature of Public Switched Telephone Networks
- Inflatable Stand Up Paddle Board or iSUP, a water craft for the sport of Stand Up Paddling that is inflated rather than having a solid construction.
