= Daniel Dugué =

French mathematician

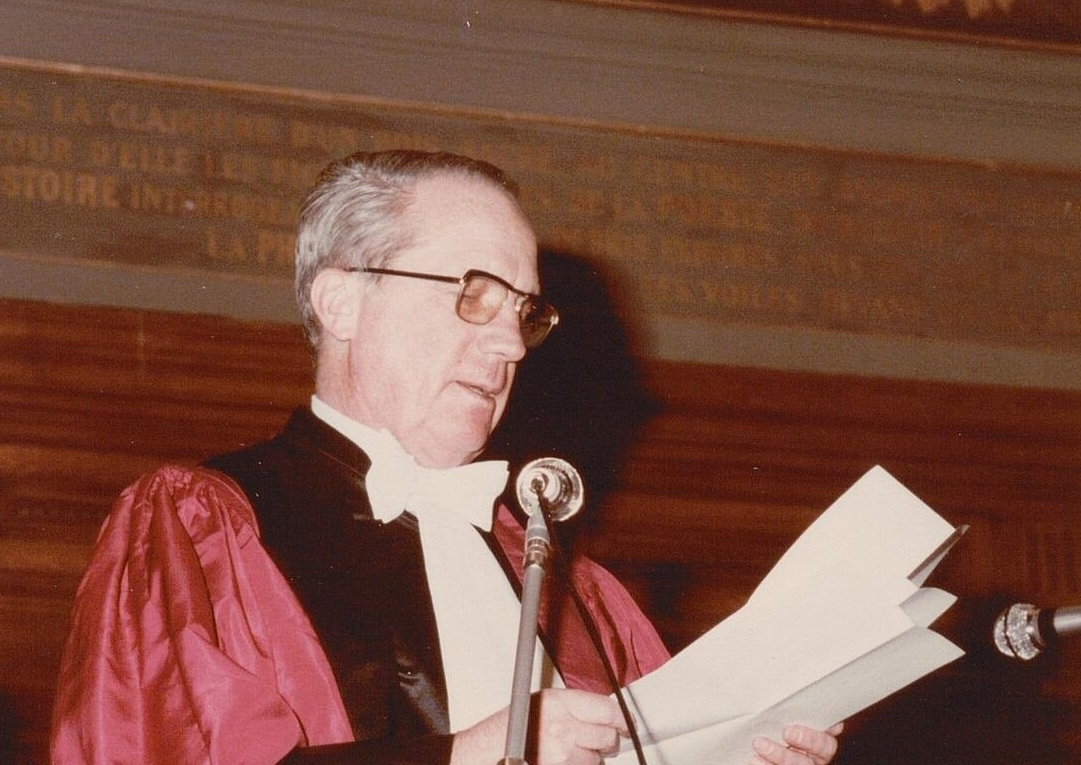
- Daniel Dugué in 1977
- Born: 22 September 1912; Saint-Louis, Senegal
- Died: 10 September 1987 (aged 74); Paris, France
- Known for: Probability, Statistics
- Scientific career
- Fields: Mathematics, Statistics
- Workplaces: Pierre and Marie Curie University, ISUP
- Doctoral advisor: Georges Darmois
- Doctoral students: Paul Deheuvels

Daniel Dugué was a French mathematician specializing in probability and statistics. He was born on 22 September 1912 in Saint-Louis in Senegal and died on 10 September 1987 in Paris, France.

== Biography ==
After finishing high-school studies in Bordeaux, Daniel Dugué was admitted to ENS and with a degree agrégation de mathématiques when he was 21 years old, in 1933. He defended the doctoral dissertation in mathematics when he was 25 years old under the supervision of Georges Darmois and defended it before Émile Borel and Arnaud Denjoy. In the course of his thesis, Dugué proves several theorems in the theory of the maximum likelihood estimation combining results and tools from probability theory, such as those of Khinchin, Kolmogorov, and Doob with Fisher's theory of the maximum likelihood estimator. In 1937, Fisher invites Dugué to work with him in London, and Dugué spends two years as a Rockefeller fellow in London.

He subsequently contributed to the development of the rigorous theory of the maximum likelihood estimator. He also worked with Yuri Linnik on the decomposition of probability distributions.

Dugué succeeded Georges Darmois as a director of the Paris Institute of Statistics in 1960, leading it until his retirement in 1981. He was married to Lucie Canaud and had four children, Catherine, Élisabeth, David, and Marc. He died from illness in 1987.

== Scientific prizes ==
- Jérôme Ponti Prize (1946)
- Montyon Prize (1947)

== Scientific work ==
- Application des propriétés de la limite au sens du calcul des probabilités à l’étude de diverses questions d’estimation, Thesis, Faculté des sciences de Paris, 1937.
- Analycité et convexité des fonctions caractéristiques, in: Généralisations de la loi de probabilité de Laplace, 56 pages, Paris, Institut Henri-Poincaré, 1951.
- Arithmétique des lois de probabilités, 50 pages, Paris, Gauthier-Villars, 1957.
- Fonctions connexes de Polya, avec Maurice Girault, 302 pages, Paris, Institut Henri-Poincaré, 1957.
- Statistique et psychologie, 4 fascicules de 48, 52, 25 et 38 pages, Paris, Institut Henri-Poincaré, 1957.
- Sur certains exemples de décomposition en arithmétique des lois de probabilité, in: L'ennuple projectif et l'unification de théories de l'électromagnétisme de Weyl et de Veblen-Hoffmann, 39 pages, Paris, Institut Henri-Poincaré, 1951.
- Sur la convergence presque complète des moyennes de variables aléatoires, 273 pages, Paris, Institut de statistique de l'université de Paris, 1957.
- Algèbres de Boole, avec une introduction à la théorie algébrique des graphes orientés et aux sous-ensembles flous, par Michel Serfati, préface de Daniel Dugué, 183 pages, Paris, Centre de documentation universitaire, 1974.
- Probabilités et statistiques en recherche scientifique, par Alex Rosengard, préface de Daniel Dugué, 311 pages, Paris, Dunod, 1972.
