= FAMD =

FAMD may refer to:

- Factor analysis of mixed data
- Mala Mala Airport, ICAO airport code FAMD
