= Paris Institute of Statistics =

Coordinates: 48.8284°N 2.3565°E

- Institut de Statistique de l'Université de Paris
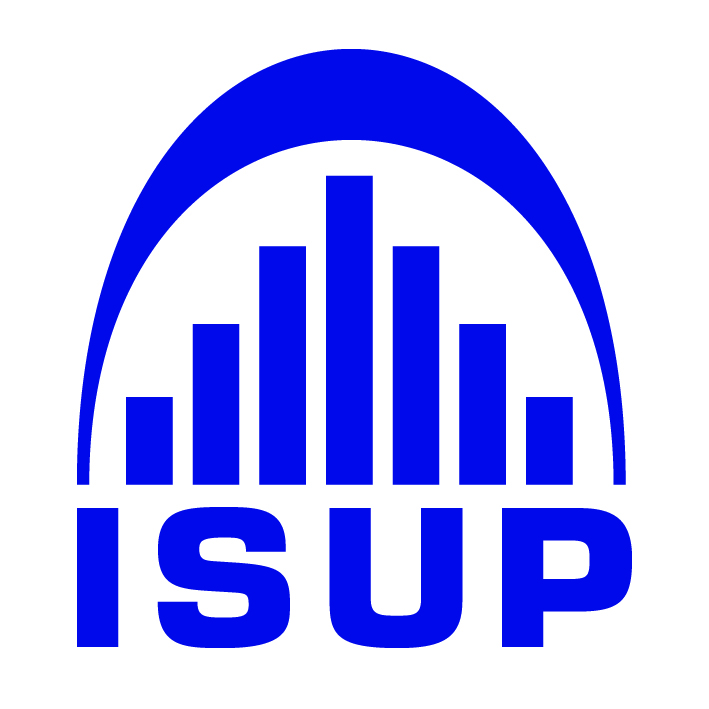
- Motto: L'excellence statistique
- Motto in English: The statistical excellence
- Type: Grande Ecole
- Established: 1922 by Émile Borel
- Affiliations: Institute of Actuaries of France, Sorbonne University
- Director: Olivier Lopez
- Students: From 120 to 150
- Location: Paris, France
- Campus: Jussieu
- Website: www.isup.upmc.fr

Institut de Statistique de l'Université de Paris (ISUP, roughly translated as "Paris Institute of Statistics" or literally to "Institute of Statistics of the University of Paris") is a graduate school of statistics based in Paris, in the fifth arrondissement. It offers specializations in actuarial sciences (finance and insurance), biostatistics as well as industry and services. Founded in 1922 by the mathematician Émile Borel, it is the oldest and one of the most prestigious schools for statistics in France. Since 2018, the institute is affiliated to Sorbonne University and located on the campus of Jussieu.

== History ==
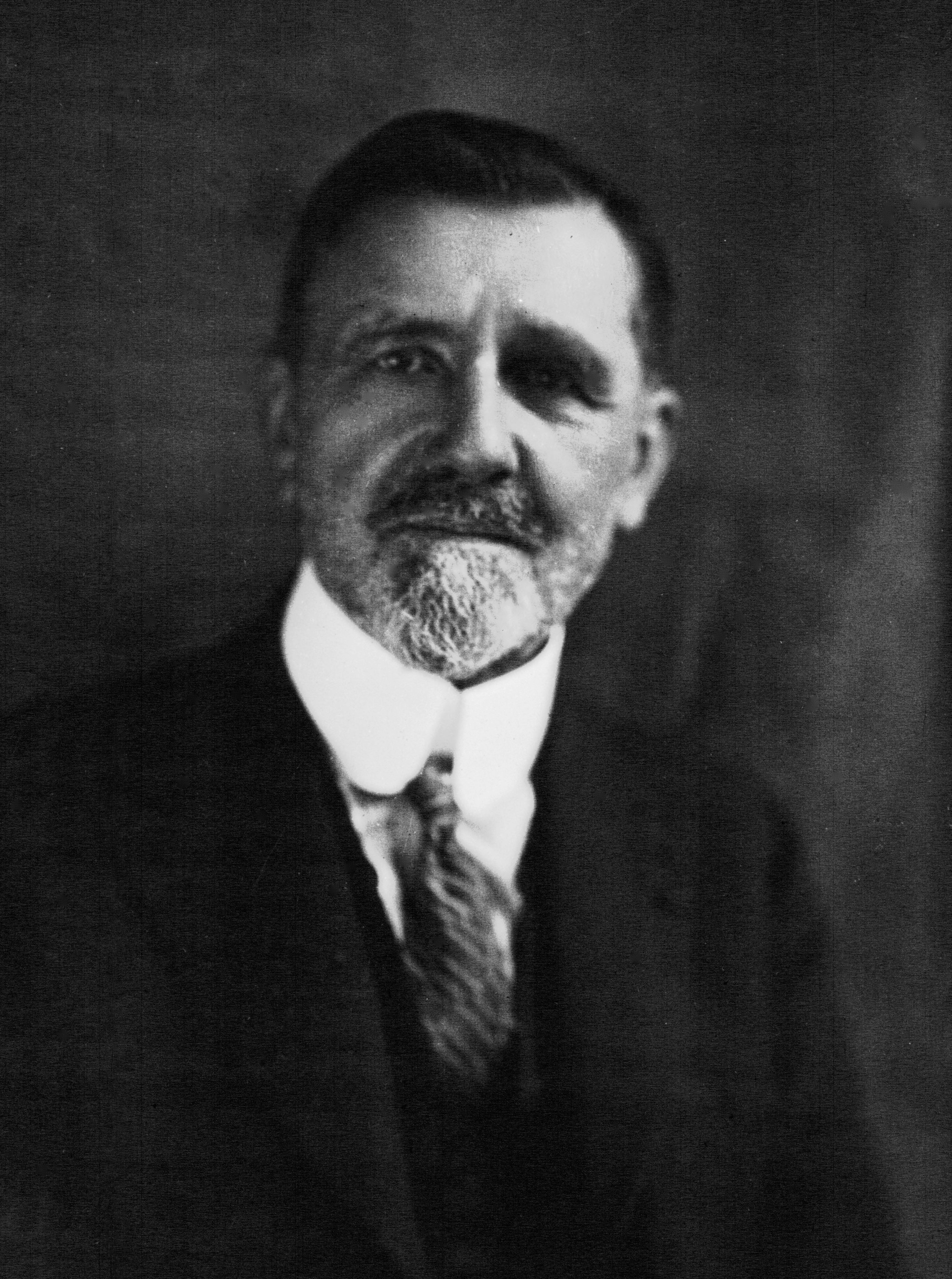
Émile Borel, founder of ISUP (1922)

The ISUP is the oldest training statistics in France: it was founded in 1922 (by the mathematician Émile Borel) 20 years before the ENSAE Paris.

At the end of the Great War, Émile Borel, one of the greatest mathematicians of his time, was appointed to the Chair of Probability and Mathematical Physics at the University of Paris. So at this time, there is almost no teaching of statistics and the idea of applying mathematics to any specific field arouses contempt "real" mathematicians. Borel is confident that in economy - in Insurance, in particular - there is a demand. This intuition is the basis for the creation of the ISUP 1922. During the thirty years that followed, under the leadership of mathematical leaders, ISUP will initiate the introduction in France, the teaching of statistics and industrial applications, management or Operational Research.

=== Modern history ===
The current headmaster is Olivier Lopez. Among teachers, traditionally shared with the University of Paris VI or with some ESSEC (partner school) or Dauphine (other actuarial school), several have a worldwide reputation for their research. These include Jean Jacod (the Franco-German Science Award 2008), Paul Deheuvels (a member of the Academy of Sciences), Gérard Biau (2003 prices young statistician of the French Society of Statistics). On its website, the administration announced that it received 1,064 job offers in 2007, it represents more than 20 offers per student. The average compensation for hiring students ISUP makes the ISUP among major French schools that offer the best remuneration.

== Notable people from ISUP ==
- Émile Borel, Academician, fondator and first director
- Maurice Allais, Nobel Prize for Economics 1988, professor at l'ISUP during 21 years
- Georges Darmois, Academician, former director
- Daniel Dugué, Academician, former director, author for Encyclopædia Universalis (Calculation of probability)
- Jean-Paul Benzécri, Normalien, professor at ISUP, initiator of Data analysis
- Paul Deheuvels, Academician, currently professor
- Dominique Strauss-Kahn, former Director of International Monetary Fund, former student.
- Nicholas Georgescu-Roegen, Romanian mathematician, statistician and economist, progenitor of Ecological economics, former student.

== See also ==
- Pierre and Marie Curie University
- Institute of Actuaries of France
- Society of actuaries
