= Adrian Raftery =

Irish statistician and sociologist

Adrian E. Raftery
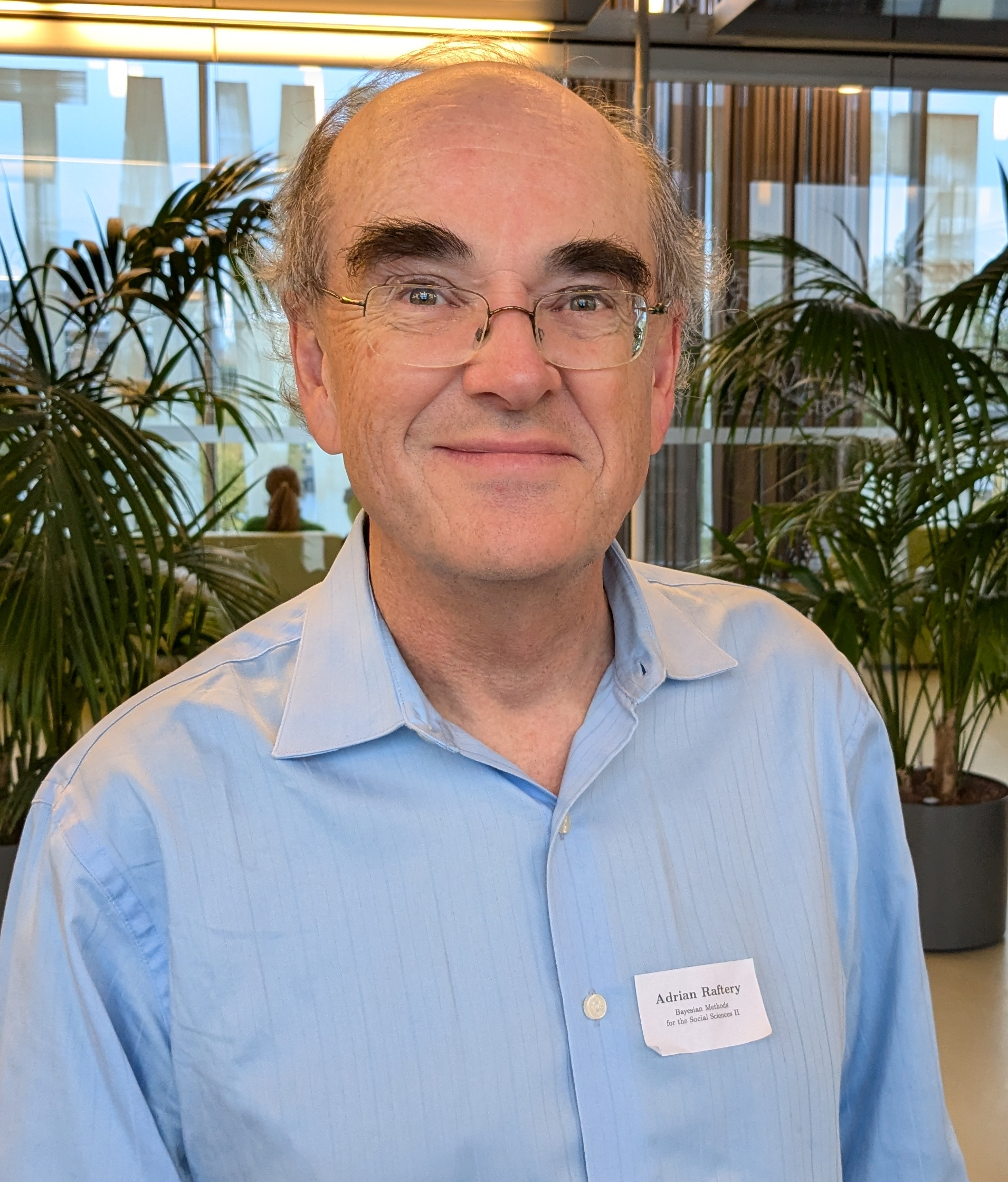
- Born: 1955
- Education: Trinity College Dublin; Université Paris VI
- Scientific career
- Fields: Statistics
- Workplaces: University of Washington
- Thesis: Processus autorégressifs exponentiels : propriétés et estimation (1980)
- Doctoral advisor: Paul Deheuvels
- Website: sites.stat.washington.edu/raftery/

Adrian Elmes Raftery (born 1955 in Dublin, Ireland) is an Irish and American statistician and sociologist. He is the Boeing International Professor of Statistics and Sociology, and founding Director of the Center for Statistics and Social Sciences at the University of Washington in Seattle, Washington, United States.

Raftery studied mathematics and statistics at Trinity College Dublin, Ireland, in 1976 and obtained his doctorate in mathematical statistics in 1980 from the Université Pierre et Marie Curie in Paris, France, advised by Paul Deheuvels. From 1980 to 1986, he was a lecturer in statistics at Trinity College Dublin, where he was elected to fellowship in the year he left. He then moved to the faculty of the University of Washington, where has been since. He was elected a Fellow of the American Academy of Arts and Sciences in 2003 and a member of the United States National Academy of Sciences in 2009. He was identified as the world's most cited researcher in mathematics for the decade 1995–2005 by Thomson-ISI.

As of 2009, Raftery has written or coauthored over 150 articles in scholarly journals. His research has focused on the development of new statistical methods, particularly for the social, environmental and health sciences. He has been a leader in developing methods for Bayesian model selection and Bayesian model averaging, and model-based clustering, as well as inference from computer simulation models. He has recently developed new methods for probabilistic weather forecasting and probabilistic population projections.

== Selected publications ==
- Raftery, A. E. (2001). Statistics in Sociology, 1950—2000: A Selective Review. Sociological Methodology, 31, 1-45.
- Raftery, A. E.; Gneiting, T.; Balabdaoui, F.; Polakowski, M. (2005). "Using Bayesian Model Averaging to Calibrate Forecast Ensembles". Monthly Weather Review. 133 (5): 1155. Bibcode:2005MWRv..133.1155R. doi:10.1175/MWR2906.1.
- Sloughter, J. M. L.; Raftery, A. E.; Gneiting, T.; Fraley, C. (2007). "Probabilistic Quantitative Precipitation Forecasting Using Bayesian Model Averaging". Monthly Weather Review. 135 (9): 3209. Bibcode:2007MWRv..135.3209S. doi:10.1175/MWR3441.1.
- McLean Sloughter, J.; Gneiting, T.; Raftery, A. E. (2013). "Probabilistic Wind Vector Forecasting Using Ensembles and Bayesian Model Averaging". Monthly Weather Review. 141 (6): 2107. Bibcode:2013MWRv..141.2107M. doi:10.1175/MWR-D-12-00002.1.
