= Georges Darmois =

French mathematician (1888–1960)

- Born: 24 June 1888; Éply, Meurthe-et-Moselle, France
- Died: 3 January 1960 (aged 71); Paris, France
- Education: University of Paris
- Scientific career
- Fields: Mathematics
- Workplaces: University of Paris; École Normale Supérieure
- Doctoral advisor: Édouard Goursat
- Doctoral students: Daniel Dugué; André Lichnerowicz; Marcel-Paul Schützenberger

Georges Darmois (24 June 1888 – 3 January 1960) was a French mathematician and statistician. He pioneered in the theory of sufficiency, in stellar statistics, and in factor analysis. He was also one of the first French mathematicians to teach British mathematical statistics.

He is one of the eponyms of the Koopman–Pitman–Darmois theorem and sufficient statistics and exponential families.

== Biography ==
Darmois was born on 24 June 1888 in Éply. He was admitted to École normale supérieure in 1906 and passed subsequently the agrégation de mathematiques in 1909. From 1911 to 1914, he was a qualified assistant (agrégé préparateur) at the École normale supérieure, where his scientific activities were directed by Émile Borel who rapidly appreciated his talent.

Darmois earned his doctorate from the University of Paris in 1921. He defended a thesis on algebraic curves and partial differential equations before the jury consisting of Émile Picard and Édouard Goursat. In 1949, he succeeded Maurice René Fréchet as the Chair of Calculus of Probabilities and Mathematical Physics at the University of Paris, who had himself succeeded Émile Borel. His research spanned several fields of pure and applied mathematics, including geometry, general relativity, physics, statistics, time series, and econometrics.

He was elected fellow of the Econometric Society in 1952. In 1955 he was elected as a Fellow of the American Statistical Association. He was also the president of International Statistical Institute from 1953 until 1960.

== Contributions ==
His scientific contributions include:

- Giving the first rigorous proof of Fréchet–Darmois–Cramér–Rao inequality, also known as Cramér–Rao bound, in 1945 independently from Rao and Cramér.
- Developing the notion of Koopman–Darmois family of distributions also known as the exponential family of distributions.
- Establishing Koopman–Pitman–Darmois theorem
- Characterizing Gaussian distributions with Darmois–Skitovich theorem
