= Gérard Biau =

French academic

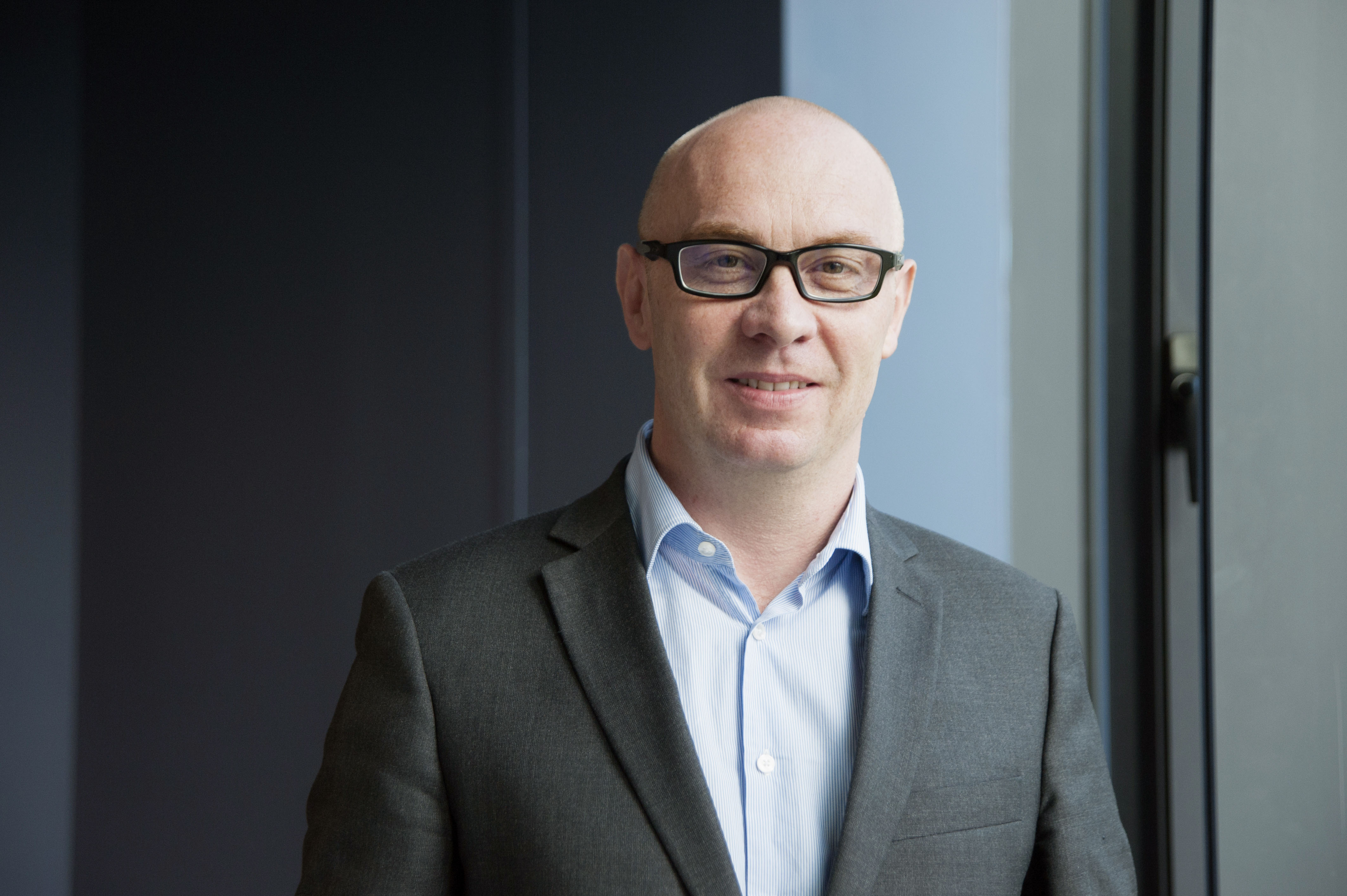

Gérard Biau is a French professor whose contributions are specialized in statistics and machine learning.

== Career ==
He studied at Mines Paris – PSL and obtained his PhD under the supervision of Alain Berlinet at Montpellier University.

After getting his accreditation to supervise research in 2003, he was appointed as full professor at Montpellier University in 2004. In 2007, he joined the Laboratoire de Probabilités, Statistique et Modélisation of Sorbonne University. Gérard Biau is a founding member of SCAI, the Sorbonne Center for Artificial Intelligence of Sorbonne University, which he directed from 2019 to 2026.

He was a junior member of the Institut Universitaire de France from 2012 to 2017, and served as the President of the French Statistical Society from 2015 to 2018. In 2018, he was awarded the Michel-Monpetit Prize. In 2024, he was appointed as a senior member of the Institut Universitaire de France, and elected as a permanent member of the French Academy of Sciences.

== Research ==
His work focuses on the study of the statistical properties of artificial intelligence algorithms: random forests, functional data analysis, gradient boosting, k-nearest neighbors algorithm, Generative Adversarial Networks, recurrent neural networks, and, more recently, physics-informed machine learning.

He is one of the three authors of the teaching book Mathématiques et statistique pour les sciences de la nature, and co-author, with Luc Devroye, of the monograph Lectures on the Nearest Neighbor Method.

Gérard Biau is an associate editor of the statistical journals International Statistical Review (since 2009), Journal of the American Statistical Association (2017-2025), Biometrika (since 2018), and The Annals of Statistics (since 2019).

== Awards ==
- 2003 : Prix Marie-Jeanne Laurent-Duhamel
- 2018 : Prix Michel-Monpetit
- 2023 : Forum Lecturer, 34th European Meeting of Statisticians, Warsaw
