= Ordination (statistics) =

Statistical method

Ordination or gradient analysis, in multivariate analysis, is a method complementary to data clustering, and used mainly in exploratory data analysis (rather than in hypothesis testing). In contrast to cluster analysis, ordination orders quantities in a (usually lower-dimensional) latent space. In the ordination space, quantities that are near each other share attributes (i.e., are similar to some degree), and dissimilar objects are farther from each other. Such relationships between the objects, on each of several axes or latent variables, are then characterized numerically and/or graphically in a biplot.

The first ordination method, principal components analysis, was suggested by Karl Pearson in 1901.

== Methods ==
Ordination methods can broadly be categorized in eigenvector-, algorithm-, or model-based methods. Many classical ordination techniques, including principal components analysis, correspondence analysis (CA) and its derivatives (detrended correspondence analysis, canonical correspondence analysis, and redundancy analysis, belong to the first group).

The second group includes some distance-based methods such as non-metric multidimensional scaling, and machine learning methods such as T-distributed stochastic neighbor embedding and nonlinear dimensionality reduction.

The third group includes model-based ordination methods, which can be considered as multivariate extensions of Generalized Linear Models. Model-based ordination methods are more flexible in their application than classical ordination methods, so that it is for example possible to include random-effects. Unlike in the aforementioned two groups, there is no (implicit or explicit) distance measure in the ordination. Instead, a distribution needs to be specified for the responses as is typical for statistical models. These and other assumptions, such as the assumed mean-variance relationship, can be validated with the use of residual diagnostics, unlike in other ordination methods.

== Applications ==
Ordination can be used on the analysis of any set of multivariate objects. It is frequently used in several environmental or ecological sciences, particularly plant community ecology. It is also used in genetics and systems biology for microarray data analysis and in psychometrics.

== See also ==
- Multivariate statistics
- Principal components analysis
- Correspondence analysis
- Multiple correspondence analysis
- Detrended correspondence analysis
- Intrinsic dimension
- Latent space
- Latent variable model
- Dimensionality Reduction
