= Paul Deheuvels =

French statistician (1948–2026)

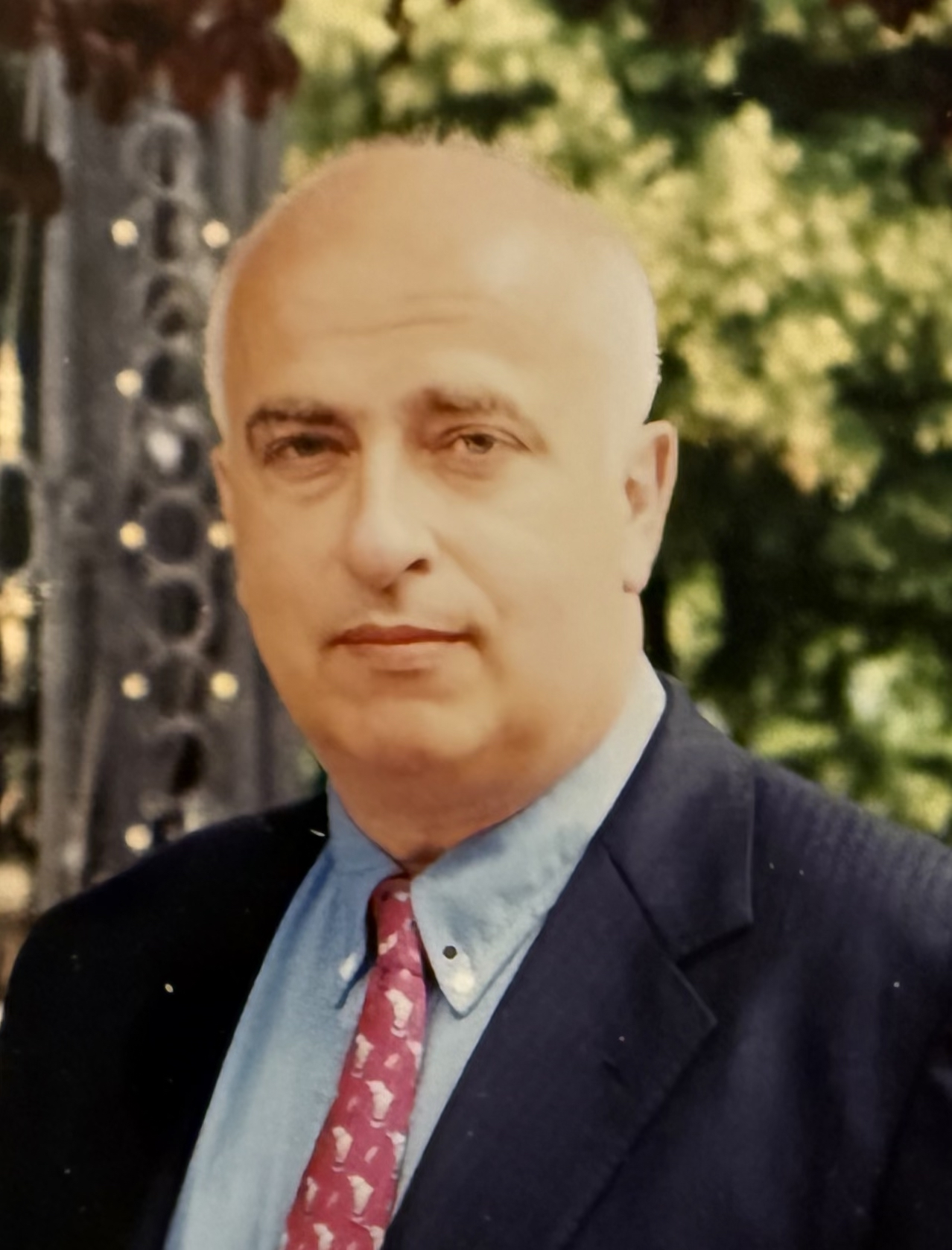
- Born: 11 March 1948; Istanbul, Turkey
- Died: 30 January 2026 (aged 77)
- Known for: Probability, statistics
- Scientific career
- Fields: Mathematics, statistics, probability
- Institutions: Pierre and Marie Curie University, ISUP
- Doctoral advisor: Daniel Dugué
- Doctoral students: Adrian Raftery; Judith Rousseau; Zhan Shi

Paul Deheuvels (11 March 1948 – 30 January 2026) was a French statistician and a specialist in probability.

From 1974 to 2013, Paul Deheuvels was a professor of mathematics at the university of Pierre-et-Marie Curie University (now Sorbonne University) in Paris before being appointed professor emeritus. He taught probability and statistics.

Deheuvels was elected Fellow of the Institute of Mathematical Statistics in 1985, and Member of the French Academy of Sciences in 2000. He was also a member of the International Statistical Institute (ISI), and a foreign corresponding member of the Royal Academy of Exact, Physical and Natural Sciences of Spain.

== Education ==
Deheuvels completed his secondary education at Lycée Lakanal in Sceaux, France, at the age of 17. After preparatory classes in mathematics at Lycée Louis-le-Grand, he was admitted in 1967, at the age of 19, to the École Normale Supérieure, rue d’Ulm.

== Research ==
Deheuvels' work was in the fields of extreme value theory, empirical processes, nonparametric estimation of tails and tail indices, extreme dependence and extreme copula (statistics).

== Séralini affair ==
The Séralini affair was the controversy surrounding the publication, retraction, and republication of a journal article by French molecular biologist Gilles-Éric Séralini. The study was criticized by various regulatory authorities and scientists prior to retraction. With few exceptions, the scientific community dismissed the study and called for a more rigorous peer-review system in scientific journals. Deheuvels was one scientist who supported the study.

== Death ==
Deheuvels died on 30 January 2026, at the age of 77.

== Books ==
- L’Intégrale, Presses Universitaires de France, 1980 (ISBN 2130366481).
- La recherche scientifique, Que sais-je?, 1990 (ISBN 9782130432418).
- Lectures on Empirical Processes: Theory and Statistical Applications, EMS Series of Lectures in Mathematics, 2007.
- Probabilité, Hasard et Incertitude (Que sais-je ?), PUF, 2008 (ISBN 9782130571254).
