= Éply =

Eply
- Commune
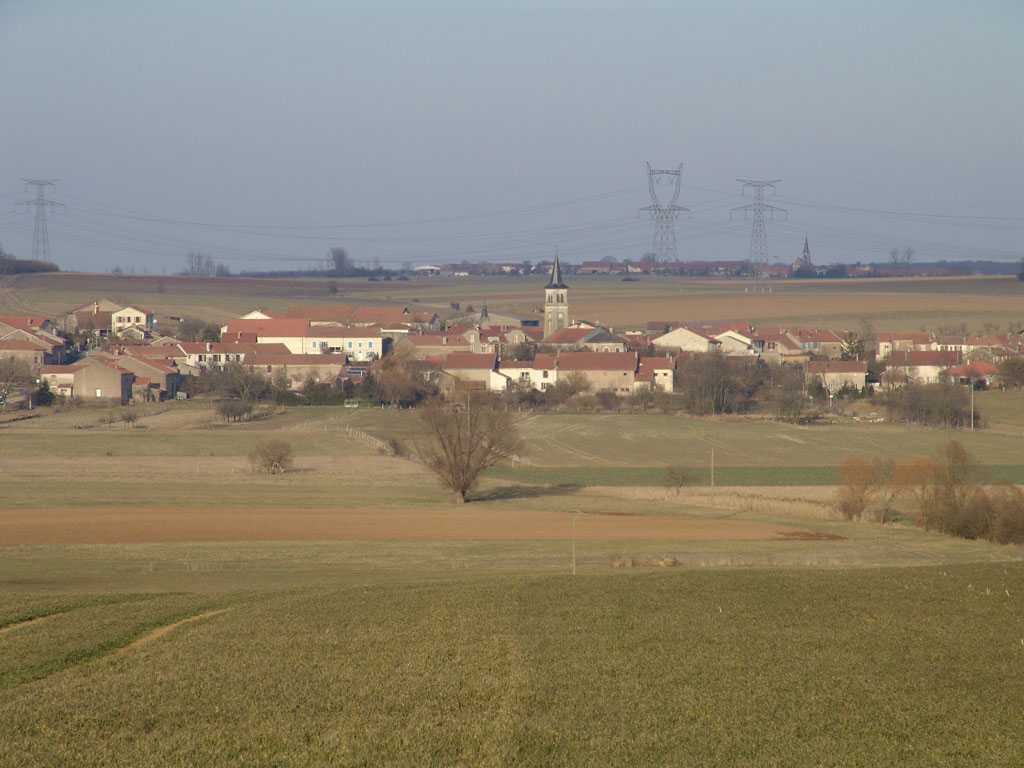
- Eply seen from the road to Morville

- Coat of arms
- Location of Eply
- Location within France Location within Grand Est
- Coordinates: 48°55′14″N 6°10′52″E
- Country: France
- Region: Grand Est
- Department: Meurthe-et-Moselle
- Arrondissement: Nancy
- Canton: Entre Seille et Meurthe
- Intercommunality: Seille et Grand Couronné

Government
  - Mayor (2020–2026): Gérard Gay
- Area^{1}: 11.17 km^{2} (4.31 sq mi)
- Elevation: 192 m (630 ft)
- Highest elevation: 238 m (781 ft)
- Lowest elevation: 177 m (581 ft)
- Population (2023): 291
  - Density: 26.1/km^{2} (67.5/sq mi)
- Time zone: UTC+01:00 (CET)
  - Summer (DST): UTC+02:00 (CEST)
- INSEE/Postal code: 54179 /54610
- ^{1} French Land Register data, which excludes lakes, ponds, glaciers > 1 km^{2} (0.386 sq mi or 247 acres) and river estuaries.

Éply (French pronunciation: [epli]) is a commune in the Meurthe-et-Moselle department in north-eastern France.

== See also ==
- Communes of the Meurthe-et-Moselle department
