= French Statistical Society =

Professional organization

The French Statistical Society (in French, Société française de statistique, SFdS) is a French learned society founded in 1997 specialising in statistics. Its vocation is to promote the use of statistics, to enhance its public understanding, and to encourage associated methodological developments.

== Actions ==
=== Publications ===
The SFdS publishes several scientific journals:

- Journal de la société française de statistique (Journal of the French Statistical Society, J-SFdS), in French and English.
- Statistique et Enseignement in French.
- Statistique et Société in French.
- Case Studies In Business, Industry And Government Statistics (CSBIGS) in collaboration with Bentley University.

=== Events and outreach ===
The SFdS organizes every year the journées de statistiques (JdS).

=== Awards ===
- Prix du Docteur Norbert Marx for contributions in epidepiology, public health or health economics.
- Prix Marie-Jeanne Laurent-Duhamel for a PhD thesis from a French speaking statistician.
- Prix Pierre-Simon de Laplace awarded every three years to an accomplished French-speaking statistician.

== History ==
The society was founded on 6 August 1997, and was recognised to serve the public benefit by the French administration on 3 December 1998. The SFdS results from the merging of the société de statistique de Paris (SSP), founded in 1860, the association pour la statistique et ses utilisations (ASU), founded in 1969 and the société de statistique de France (SSF) funded in 1976
