= Paleontological Statistics =

Free statistical software for paleontology and related fields

PAST (PAleontological STatistics)
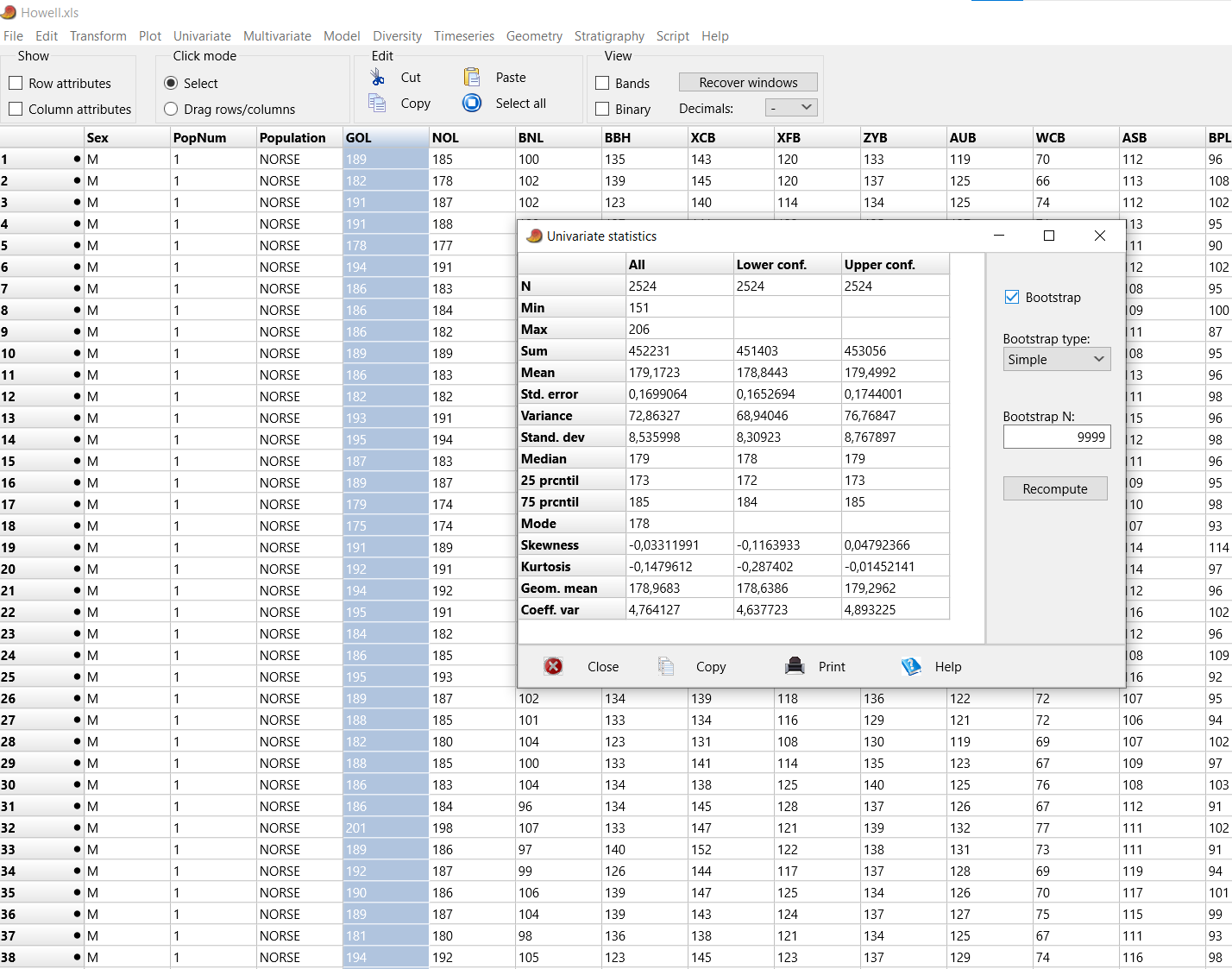
- PAST 4.13 running on Windows 10
- Developers: Øyvind Hammer, David A.T. Harper, Paul D. Ryan
- Release: 2001; 25 years ago
- Stable release: 4.13 / May 2023; 3 years ago
- Size: ~30 MB
- Type: Statistical analysis Numerical analysis
- License: Freeware
- Website: www.nhm.uio.no/english/research/resources/past/

PAST (PAleontological STatistics) is a free software package for statistical data analysis with a focus on palaeontological data.

== Development ==
PAST's predecessor was PALSTAT, developed by palaeontologists David Harper (University of Copenhagen) and Paul Ryan (National University of Ireland), first for BBC Microcomputer and later for MS-DOS.

The development of PAST started in 1999, the development team consisted of Harper, Ryan as well as Øyvind Hammer (University of Oslo), who is still the maintainer today.

== Functions and operation ==
PAST includes functions for data management, data visualisation through graphics, univariate and multivariate analysis procedures as well as linear and non-linear modelling. There are also functions for diversity calculation, time series analysis, geostatistical and stratigraphic analysis.

The operation is basically mouse-controlled. In addition, control via syntax scripts is provided, using a Pascal-like script language.

== Usage ==
PAST was used for studies in paleontology, forensics, archaeology or microbiology.

The software was recommended because it is "... designed specifically for paleontologists" and "... incorporates a vast majority of analytical methods suitable for paleontological and current ecological work".
