= Dunod =

Dunod is a given name. Notable people with the name include:

- Dunod Fawr, 6th century Brythonic King somewhere in the North of Britain
- Saint Dunod, late 6th/early 7th century Abbot of Bangor-on-Dee
