= Thermochronology =

Study of the thermal evolution of a region of a planet

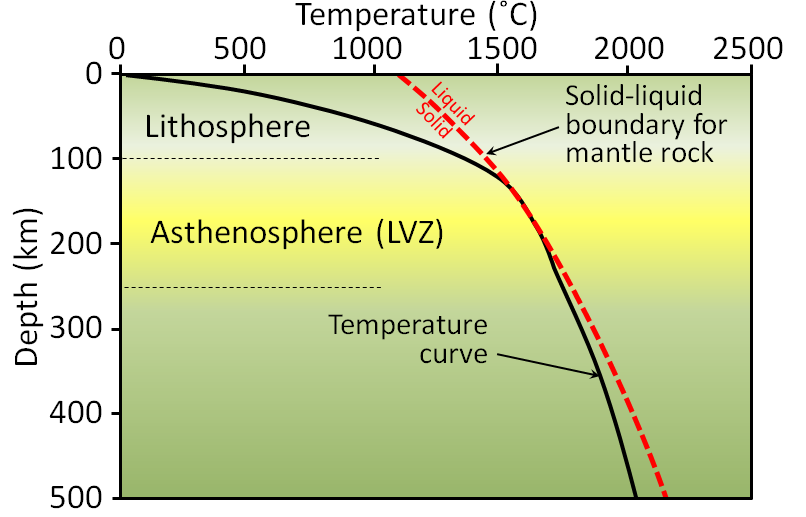
Approximate temperature curve within depths of Earth. Shows that it gets hotter with increased depth.

Thermochronology is the study of the thermal evolution of a region of a planet. Thermochronologists use radiometric dating along with the closure temperatures that represent the temperature of the mineral being studied at the time given by the date recorded to understand the thermal history of a specific rock, mineral, or geologic unit. It is a subfield within geology, and is closely associated with geochronology.

A typical thermochronological study will involve the dates of a number of rock samples from different areas in a region, often from a vertical transect along a steep canyon, cliff face, or slope. These samples are then dated. With some knowledge of the subsurface thermal structure, these dates are translated into depths and times at which that particular sample was at the mineral's closure temperature. If the rock is today at the surface, this process gives the exhumation rate of the rock.

Common isotopic systems used for thermochronology include fission track dating in zircon, apatite, titanite, natural glasses, and other uranium-rich mineral grains. Others include potassium-argon and argon-argon dating in apatite, and (U-Th)/He dating zircon and apatite.

== Radiometric Dating ==
Radiometric dating is how geologists determine the age of a rock. In a closed system, the amount of radiogenic isotopes present in a sample is a direct function of time and the decay rate of the mineral. Therefore, to find the age of a sample, geologists find the ratio of daughter isotopes to remaining parent isotopes present in the mineral through different methods, such as mass spectrometry. From the known parent isotopes and the decay constant, we can then determine the age. Different ions can be analyzed for this and are called different dating.

For thermochronology, the ages associated with these isotopic ratios are directly linked with the sample's thermal history. At high temperatures, the rocks will behave as if they are in an open system, which relates to the increased rate of diffusion of the daughter isotopes out of the mineral. At low temperatures, however, the rocks will behave as a closed system, meaning that all the products of decay are still found within the original host rock, and therefore more accurate to date. The same mineral can switch between these two systems of behavior, but not instantaneously. In order to switch over, the rock must first reach its closure temperature. Closure temperature is specific for each mineral and can be very useful if multiple minerals are found in a sample. This temperature is dependent on several assumptions, including: grain size and shape, a constant cooling rate, and chemical composition.

=== Types of Dating associated with Thermochronology ===
==== Fission Track Dating ====
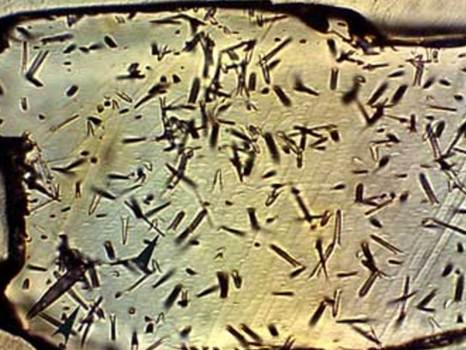
Fission tracks observed in a mineral under optical microscope.

Fission track dating is the method used in thermochronology to find the approximate age of several uranium-rich minerals, such as apatite. When nuclear fission of uranium-238 (^{238}U) happens in inorganic materials, damage tracks are created. These are due to a fast charged particle, released from the decay of Uranium, creating a thin trail of damage along its trajectory through the solid. To better study the fission tracks created, the natural damage tracks are further enlarged by chemical etching so they can be viewed under ordinary optical microscopes. The age of the mineral is then determined by first knowing the spontaneous rate of fission decay, and then measuring the number of tracks accumulated over the mineral's lifetime as well as estimating the amount of Uranium still present.

At higher temperatures, fission tracks are known to anneal. Therefore, exact dating of samples is very hard. Absolute age can only be determined if the sample has cooled rapidly and remain undisturbed at or close to the surface. The environmental conditions, such as pressure and temperature, and their effects on the fission track on the atomic level still remains unclear. However, the stability of the fission tracks can generally be narrowed down to temperature and time. Approximate ages of minerals still reflect aspects of the thermal history of the sample, such as uplift and denudation.

==== Potassium-Argon/Argon-Argon Dating ====
Potassium-Argon/Argon-Argon dating is applied in thermochronology in order to find the age of the minerals, such as apatite. Potassium-argon (K-Ar) dating is concerned with determining the amount of the product of radioactive decay of isotopic potassium (^{40}K) into its decay product of isotopic argon (^{40}Ar). Because the ^{40}Ar is able to escape in liquids, such as molten rock, but accumulates when the rock solidifies, or recrystallizes, geologists are able to measure the time since recrystallization by looking at the ratio of the amount of ^{40}Ar that has accumulated to the ^{40}K remaining. The age can be found by knowing the half-life of potassium.

Argon-argon dating uses the ratio of ^{40}Ar to ^{39}Ar as a proxy for ^{40}K to find the date of a sample. This method has been adopted because it only requires one measurement of an isotope. To do this, the nucleus of the argon isotope needs to be irradiated from a nuclear reactor in order to convert the stable isotope ^{39}K to radioactive ^{40}Ar. In order to measure the age of the rock, you have to repeat this process in a sample of known age in order to compare the ratios.

==== (U-Th)/He Dating ====
(U-Th)/He dating is used to measure the age of a sample by measuring the amount of radiogenic helium (^{4}He) present as a result of the alpha decay from uranium and thorium. This helium product is kept in the mineral until the closure temperature is reached, and therefore can be determinant of the thermal evolution of the mineral. As in fission track dating, the exact age of the sample is difficult to determine. If the temperature goes above the closure temperature the product of decay, helium, diffuses to the atmosphere and the dating then resets.

== Applications ==
By determining the relative date and temperature of a sample being studied, geologists are able to understand the structural information of the deposits. Thermochronology is used in a wide variety of subjects today, such as tectonic studies, exhumation of mountain belts, hydrothermal ore deposits, and even meteorites. Understanding the thermal history of an area, such as its exhumation rate, crystallization duration, and more, can be applicable in a wide variety of fields and help understand the history of earth and its thermal evolution.

== See also ==
- Astronomical chronology
  - Age of the Earth
  - Age of the universe
- Chronological dating, archaeological chronology
  - Absolute dating
  - Relative dating
  - Phase (archaeology)
  - Archaeological association
- Geochronology
  - Future of the Earth
  - Geologic time scale
  - Geological history of Earth
  - Plate reconstruction
  - Plate tectonics
  - Timeline of natural history
  - List of geochronologic names
- General
  - Consilience, evidence from independent, unrelated sources can "converge" on strong conclusions
