= Archaeological science =

Application of scientific techniques to archaeology

Archaeological science consists of the application of scientific techniques to the analysis of archaeological materials and sites. It is related to methodologies of archaeology. Martinón-Torres and Killick distinguish 'scientific archaeology' (as an epistemology) from 'archaeological science' (the application of specific techniques to archaeological materials). Martinón-Torres and Killick claim that 'archaeological science' has promoted the development of high-level theory in archaeology. However, Smith rejects both concepts of archaeological science because neither emphasizes falsification or a search for causality. Marwick demonstrated that archaeologists' publication habits are more like social scientists than hard sciences such as physics.

In the United Kingdom, the Natural and Environmental Research Council provides funding for archaeometry separate from the funding provided for archaeology.

== Types of archaeological science ==
Archaeological science can be divided into the following areas:

- physical and chemical dating methods which provide archaeologists with absolute and relative chronologies
- artifact studies
- environmental approaches which provide information on past landscapes, climates, flora, and fauna; as well as the diet, nutrition, health, and pathology of people
- mathematical methods for data treatment (including computer-based methods)
- remote-sensing and geophysical-survey techniques for buried features
- conservation sciences, involving the study of decay processes and the development of new methods of conservation

Techniques such as lithic analysis, archaeometallurgy, paleoethnobotany, palynology and zooarchaeology also form sub-disciplines of archaeological science.

=== Dating techniques ===
Archaeological science has particular value when it can provide absolute dates for archaeological strata and artifacts. Some of the most important dating techniques include:

- radiocarbon dating — especially for dating organic materials
- dendrochronology — for dating trees; also very important for calibrating radiocarbon dates
- thermoluminescence dating — for dating inorganic material (including ceramics)
- optically stimulated luminescence (OSL) — for absolutely dating and relatively profiling buried land-surfaces in vertical and horizontal stratigraphic sections, most often by measuring photons discharged from grains of quartz within sedimentary bodies (although this technique can also measure potassium feldspars, complications caused by internally induced dose-rates often favor the use of quartz-based analyzes in archaeological applications)
- electron spin resonance, as used (for example) in dating teeth
- potassium-argon dating — for dating (for example) fossilized hominid remains by association with volcanic sediments (the fossils themselves are not directly dated)

=== Artifact studies ===
Another important subdiscipline of archaeometry is the study of artifacts. Archaeometrists have used a variety of methods to analyze artifacts, either to determine more about their composition, or to determine their provenance. These techniques include:

- X-ray fluorescence (XRF)
- inductively coupled plasma mass spectrometry (ICP-MS)
- neutron activation analysis (NAA)
- scanning electron microscopy (SEM)
- laser-induced breakdown spectroscopy (LIBS)

Lead, strontium and oxygen isotope analysis can also test human remains to estimate the diets and even the birthplaces of a study's subjects.

Provenance analysis has the potential to determine the original source of the materials used, for example, to make a particular artifact. This can show how far the artifact has traveled and can indicate the existence of systems of exchange. Classification methods from chemometrics, artificial intelligence and Bayesian statistics have also been applied to archaeological spectral and compositional data, including analyses of lithic and ceramic materials.

== Influence of archaeometry ==
Archaeometry has greatly influenced modern archaeology. Archaeologists can obtain significant additional data and information using these techniques, and archaeometry has the potential to revise the understanding of the past. For example, the "second radiocarbon revolution" significantly re-dated European prehistory in the 1960s, compared to the "first radiocarbon revolution" from 1949.

== Locating archaeological sites ==
Archaeometry is an important tool in finding potential dig sites. The use of remote sensing has enabled archaeologists to identify many more archaeological sites than they could have otherwise. The use of aerial photography (including satellite imagery and Lidar) remains the most widespread remote-sensing technique. Ground-based geophysical surveys often help to identify and map archaeological features within identified sites.

== See also ==
- Post-excavation analysis – Processes for studying archaeological materials after an excavation
- Dating methods in archaeology – Methods for estimating a realistic date for old items and events
