= Chronological dating =

Methods for estimating a realistic date for an event or object

Chronological dating, or simply dating, is the process of attributing to an object or event a date in the past, allowing such object or event to be located in a previously established chronology. This usually requires what is commonly known as a "dating method". Several dating methods exist, depending on different criteria and techniques, and some very well known examples of disciplines using such techniques are, for example, history, geology, paleontology, archaeology, astronomy and even forensic science, since in the latter it is sometimes necessary to investigate the moment in the past during which the death of a cadaver occurred. These methods are typically identified as absolute, which involves a specified date or date range, or relative, which refers to dating which places artifacts or events on a timeline relative to other events and/or artifacts. Other markers can help place an artifact or event in a chronology, such as nearby writings and stratigraphic markers.

== Absolute and relative dating ==
Dating methods are most commonly classified following two criteria: relative dating and absolute dating.

=== Relative dating ===
Relative dating methods are unable to determine the absolute age of an object or event, but can determine the impossibility of a particular event happening before or after another event of which the absolute date is well known. In this relative dating method, Latin terms ante quem and post quem are usually used to indicate both the most recent and the oldest possible moments when an event occurred or an artifact was left in a stratum, respectively. But this method is also useful in many other disciplines. Historians, for example, know that Shakespeare's play Henry V was not written before 1587 because Shakespeare's primary source for writing his play was the second edition of Raphael Holinshed's Chronicles, not published until 1587. Thus, 1587 is the post quem dating of Shakespeare's play Henry V. That means that the play was without fail written after (in Latin, post) 1587.

The same inductive mechanism is applied in archaeology, geology and paleontology, by many ways. For example, in a stratum presenting difficulties or ambiguities to absolute dating, paleopalynology can be used as a relative referent by means of the study of the pollens found in the stratum. This is admitted because of the simple reason that some botanical species, whether extinct or not, are well known as belonging to a determined position in the scale of time.

For a non-exhaustive list of relative dating methods and relative dating applications used in geology, paleontology or archaeology, see the following:

- Cross-cutting relationships
- Fluorine absorption dating
- Harris matrix
- Law of included fragments
- Law of superposition
- Lichenometry
- Marine isotope stages, based on the oxygen isotope ratio cycle
- Melt inclusions
- Morphology (archaeology)
- Nitrogen dating
- Palynology, the study of modern-dated pollens for the relative dating of archaeological strata, also used in forensic palynology.
- Paleomagnetism
- Paleopalynology, also spelt "Palaeopalynology", the study of fossilized pollens for the relative dating of geological strata.
- Principle of original horizontality
- Principle of lateral continuity
- Principle of faunal succession
- Seriation (archaeology)
- Sequence dating (a type of seriation)
- Tephrochronology
- Typology (archaeology)
- Uranium–lead dating. Lead corrosion dating (exclusively used in archaeology)
- Varnish microlamination
- Vole clock

=== Absolute dating ===
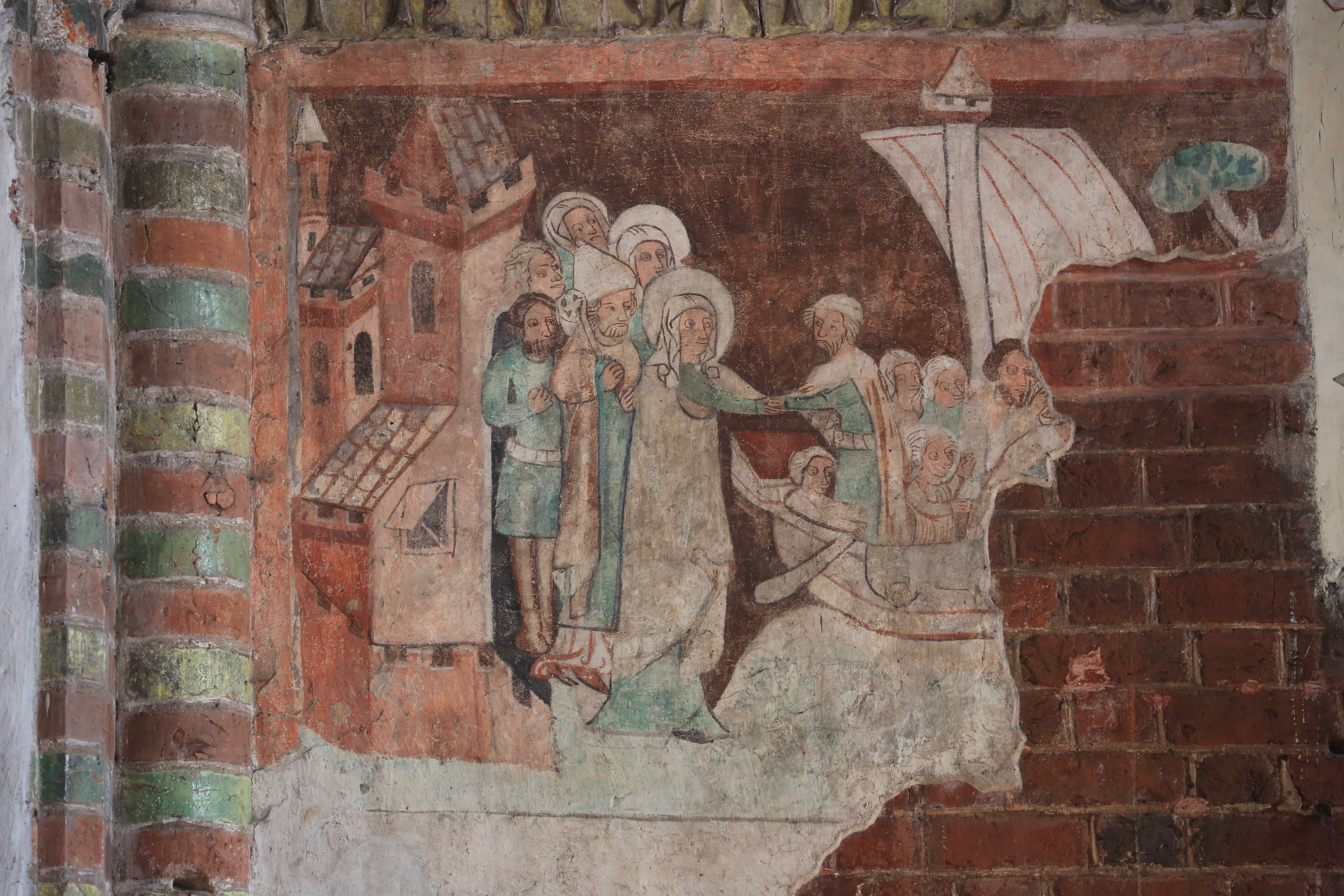
Brick adornments in Saint James Church of Toruń, wherein Thermoluminescence was used to provide an absolute date for its construction.

Absolute dating methods seek to establish a specific time during which an object originated or an event took place. While the results of these techniques are largely accepted within the scientific community, there are several factors which can hinder the discovery of accurate absolute dating, including sampling errors and geological disruptions. This type of chronological dating utilizes absolute referent criteria, mainly the radiometric dating methods. Material remains can be absolutely dated by studying the organic materials which construct the remains. For example, remains that have pieces of brick can undergo the process of thermoluminescence (TL) dating in order to determine approximately how many years ago the material was fired. This technique was used to discover the date of St. James Church in Toruń by testing the thermoluminescence of removed bricks. In this example, an absolute date was determined which filled a gap in the historical knowledge of the church.

These techniques are utilized in many other fields as well. Geologists, for example, apply absolute dating methods to rock sediment in order to discover their period of origin.

Some examples of both radiometric and non-radiometric absolute dating methods are the following:

- Amino acid dating
- Archaeomagnetic dating
- Argon–argon dating
- Astronomical chronology
- Carbon dating: Also known as radiocarbon dating, it can reveal the age of organic material in artifacts as well as human and animal remains. This process can reliably measures dates up to approximately 50,000 years ago.
- Cementochronology, this method does not determine a precise moment in a scale of time but the age at death of a dead individual.
- Datestone (exclusively used in archaeology)
- Dendrochronology
- Electron spin resonance dating
- Fission track dating
- Geochronology
- Herbchronology
- Iodine–xenon dating
- Potassium–argon dating
- Lead–lead dating
- Luminescence dating
  - Thermoluminescence dating
  - Optically stimulated luminescence
  - Optically stimulated luminescence thermochronometry
- Molecular clock (used mostly in phylogenetics and evolutionary biology)
- Obsidian hydration dating (exclusively used in archaeology)
- Oxidizable carbon ratio dating
- Rehydroxylation dating
- Rubidium–strontium dating
- Samarium–neodymium dating
- Tephrochronology
- Uranium–lead dating
- Uranium–thorium dating
- Uranium–uranium dating, useful in dating samples between about 10,000 and 2 million years Before Present (BP), or up to about eight times the half-life of 234U.
- Wiggle matching

== Dating methods in archaeology ==
Just like geologists or paleontologists, archaeologists are also brought to determine the age of both ancient and recent humans. Thus, to be considered as archaeological, the remains, objects or artifacts to be dated must be related to human activity. It is commonly assumed that if the remains or elements to be dated are older than the human species, the disciplines which study them are sciences such geology or paleontology, among some others.

Nevertheless, the range of time within archaeological dating can be enormous compared to the average lifespan of a singular human being. As an example Pinnacle Point's caves, in the southern coast of South Africa, provided evidence that marine resources (shellfish) have been regularly exploited by humans as of 170,000 years ago. On the other hand, remains as recent as a hundred years old can also be the target of archaeological dating methods. It was the case of an 18th-century sloop whose excavation was led in South Carolina (United States) in 1992. Thus, from the oldest to the youngest, all archaeological sites are likely to be dated by an appropriate method.

Dating material drawn from the archaeological record can be made by a direct study of an artifact, or may be deduced by association with materials found in the context the item is drawn from or inferred by its point of discovery in the sequence relative to datable contexts. Dating is carried out mainly post excavation, but to support good practice, some preliminary dating work called "spot dating" is usually run in tandem with excavation. Dating is very important in archaeology for constructing models of the past, as it relies on the integrity of dateable objects and samples. Many disciplines of archaeological science are concerned with dating evidence, but in practice several different dating techniques must be applied in some circumstances, thus dating evidence for much of an archaeological sequence recorded during excavation requires matching information from known absolute or some associated steps, with a careful study of stratigraphic relationships.

In addition, because of its particular relation with past human presence or past human activity, archaeology uses almost all the dating methods that it shares with the other sciences, but with some particular variations, like the following:

=== Written markers ===
- Epigraphy – analysis of inscriptions, via identifying graphemes, clarifying their meanings, classifying their uses according to dates and cultural contexts, and drawing conclusions about the writing and the writers.
- Numismatics – many coins have the date of their production written on them or their use is specified in the historical record.
- Palaeography – the study of ancient writing, including the practice of deciphering, reading, and dating historical manuscripts.

=== Seriation ===
Seriation is a relative dating method (see, above, the list of relative dating methods). An example of a practical application of seriation, is the comparison of the known style of artifacts such as stone tools or pottery.

=== Age-equivalent stratigraphic markers ===
- Paleomagnetism (a relative dating method, see the corresponding list above)
- Marine isotope stages based on the oxygen isotope ratio cycle (a relative dating method, see the corresponding list above)
- Tephrochronology (an absolute dating method, see the corresponding list above)

=== Stratigraphic relationships ===
The stratigraphy of an archaeological site can be used to date, or refine the date, of particular activities ("contexts") on that site. For example, if a context is sealed between two other contexts of known date, it can be inferred that the middle context must date to between those dates.

== See also ==
- Astronomical chronology
  - Age of Earth
  - Age of the universe
- Geochronology
  - Geologic time scale
  - Geological history of Earth
- Archaeological science
