= Dating system =

Dating system may refer to:

- Any system of chronological dating, especially
  - A calendar era, a system of year numbers
- Any system employed in dating (courtship)
