= Fission track dating =

Radiometric dating technique

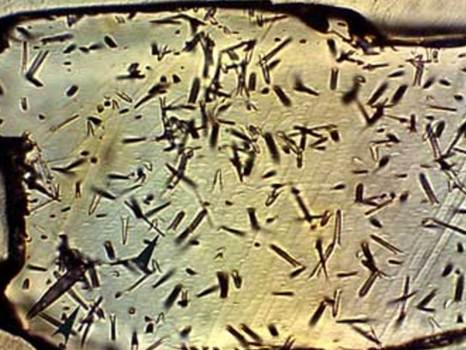
Etched fission tracks from uranium-238 in apatite. track lengths are approximately 17 microns.

Fission track dating is a radiometric dating technique based on analyses of the damage trails, or tracks, left by fission fragments in certain uranium-bearing minerals and glasses. Fission-track dating is a relatively simple method of radiometric dating that has made a significant impact on understanding the thermal history of continental crust, the timing of volcanic events, and the source and age of different archeological artifacts. The method involves using the number of fission events produced from the spontaneous decay of uranium-238 in common accessory minerals to date the time of rock cooling below closure temperature. Fission tracks are sensitive to heat, and therefore the technique is useful at unraveling the thermal evolution of rocks and minerals. Most current research using fission tracks is aimed at: a) understanding the evolution of mountain belts; b) determining the source or provenance of sediments; c) studying the thermal evolution of basins; d) determining the age of poorly dated strata; and e) dating and provenance determination of archeological artifacts.

In the 1930s it was discovered that uranium (specifically uranium-235) would undergo fission when struck by neutrons. This caused damage tracks in solids which could be revealed by chemical etching.

== Method ==
Unlike other isotopic dating methods, the "daughter" in fission track dating is an effect in the crystal rather than a daughter isotope. Uranium-238 undergoes spontaneous fission decay at a known rate, and it is the only isotope with a decay rate that is relevant to the significant production of natural fission tracks; other isotopes have fission decay rates too slow to be of consequence. The fragments emitted by this fission process leave trails of damage (fossil tracks or ion tracks) in the crystal structure of the mineral that contains the uranium. The process of track production is essentially the same by which swift heavy ions produce ion tracks. Chemical etching of polished internal surfaces of these minerals reveals spontaneous fission tracks, and the track density can be determined. Because etched tracks are relatively large (in the range 1 to 15 micrometres), counting can be done by optical microscopy, although other imaging techniques are used. The density of fossil tracks correlates with the cooling age of the sample and with uranium content, which needs to be determined independently.

To determine the uranium content, several methods have been used. One method is by neutron irradiation, where the sample is irradiated with thermal neutrons in a nuclear reactor, with an external detector, such as mica, affixed to the grain surface. The neutron irradiation induces fission of uranium-235 in the sample, and the resulting induced tracks are used to determine the uranium content of the sample because the ^{235}U:^{238}U ratio is well known and assumed constant in nature. However, it is not always constant. To determine the number of induced fission events that occurred during neutron irradiation an external detector is attached to the sample and both sample and detector are simultaneously irradiated by thermal neutrons. The external detector is typically a low-uranium mica flake, but plastics such as CR-39 have also been used. The resulting induced fission of the uranium-235 in the sample creates induced tracks in the overlying external detector, which are later revealed by chemical etching. The ratio of spontaneous to induced tracks is proportional to the age.

Another method of determining uranium concentration is through LA-ICPMS, a technique where the crystal is hit with a laser beam and ablated, and then the material is passed through a mass spectrometer.

== Applications ==
Unlike many other dating techniques, fission-track dating is uniquely suited for determining low-temperature thermal events using common accessory minerals over a very wide geological range (typically 0.1 Ma to 2000 Ma). Apatite, sphene, zircon, micas and volcanic glass typically contain enough uranium to be useful in dating samples of relatively young age (Mesozoic and Cenozoic) and are the materials most useful for this technique. Additionally low-uranium epidotes and garnets may be used for very old samples (Paleozoic to Precambrian). The fission-track dating technique is widely used in understanding the thermal evolution of the upper crust, especially in mountain belts. Fission tracks are preserved in a crystal when the ambient temperature of the rock falls below the annealing temperature. This annealing temperature varies from mineral to mineral and is the basis for determining low-temperature vs. time histories. While the details of closure temperatures are complicated, they are approximately 70 to 110 °C for typical apatite, c. 230 to 250 °C for zircon, and c. 300 °C for titanite.

Because heating of a sample above the annealing temperature causes the fission damage to heal or anneal, the technique is useful for dating the most recent cooling event in the history of the sample. This resetting of the clock can be used to investigate the thermal history of basin sediments, kilometer-scale exhumation caused by tectonism and erosion, low temperature metamorphic events, and geothermal vein formation. The fission track method has also been used to date archaeological sites and artifacts. It was used to confirm the potassium-argon dates for the deposits at Olduvai Gorge.

=== Provenance analysis of detrital grains ===
A number of datable minerals occur as common detrital grains in sandstones, and if the strata have not been buried too deeply, these minerals grains retain information about the source rock. Fission track analysis of these minerals provides information about the thermal evolution of the source rocks and therefore can be used to understand provenance and the evolution of mountain belts that shed the sediment. This technique of detrital analysis is most commonly applied to zircon because it is very common and robust in the sedimentary system, and in addition it has a relatively high annealing temperature so that in many sedimentary basins the crystals are not reset by later heating.

Fission-track dating of detrital zircon is a widely applied analytical tool used to understand the tectonic evolution of source terrains that have left a long and continuous erosional record in adjacent basin strata. Early studies focused on using the cooling ages in detrital zircon from stratigraphic sequences to document the timing and rate of erosion of rocks in adjacent orogenic belts (mountain ranges). A number of recent studies have combined U/Pb and/or helium dating (U+Th/He) on single crystals to document the specific history of individual crystals. This double-dating approach is an extremely powerful provenance tool because a nearly complete crystal history can be obtained, and therefore researchers can pinpoint specific source areas with distinct geologic histories with relative certainty. Fission-track ages on detrital zircon can be as young as 1 Ma to as old as 2000 Ma.

== See also ==
- Radiometric dating
- Thermochronology
