= Patayan =

Precontact culture in North America

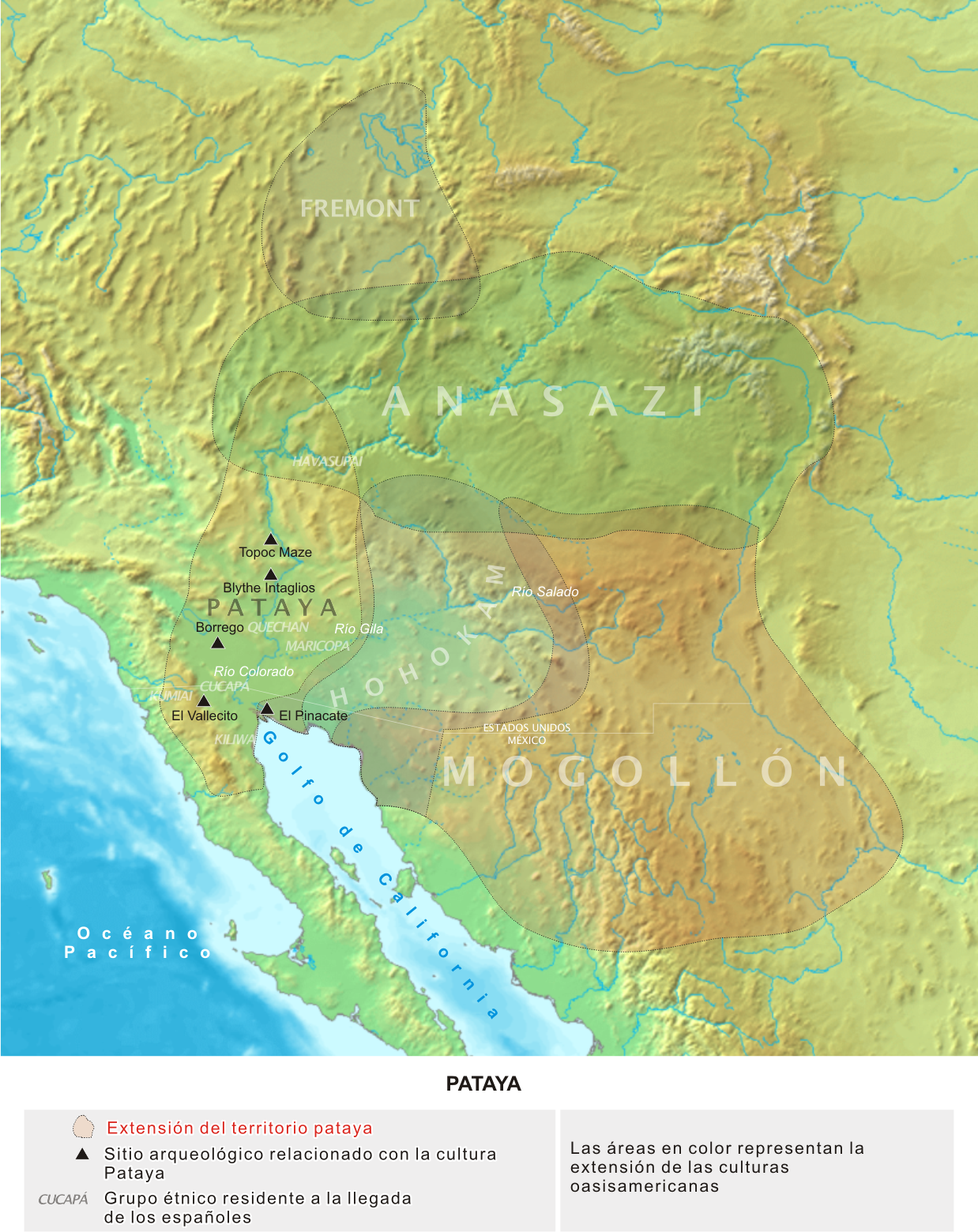
Location of the Patayan culture, in western Oasisamerica

Patayan refers to a group of precontact and historical Native American cultures residing in parts of modern-day Arizona, extending west to Lake Cahuilla in California, and in Baja California.

This cultural grouping also included areas along the Gila River, Colorado River and Lower Colorado River Valley, as well as the nearby uplands, and up north toward the vicinity of the Grand Canyon. Evidence shows that Patayan lifeways have persisted from AD 700 to the 20th century.

Pataya (pah-tah-yáh) comes from the Pai linguistic branch (Hualapai, Havasupai, Yavapai, and Paipai) from the Yuman-Cochimí language family, and translates loosely to "old people".

The Patayan archaeological record includes material remains including ceramic effigies, pottery, and evidence of early settlement sites such as pithouses. Evidence suggests that the Patayan traded with and were influenced by the Hohokam.

== Cultural neighbors ==
Patayan culture is sometimes known as the Hakataya culture. Their nearest cultural neighbors were the Hohokam in central and eastern Arizona. The historic Yuman-speaking peoples in this region were skilled warriors and active traders, maintaining exchange networks with the Pima in southern Arizona and with the Californian Pacific Coast tribes.

Patayan communities settled along the lower Gila River, as far upstream as the Painted Rock Mountains, as early as Patayan I. This placed them in close proximity to contemporaneous Colonial period (AD 750–950) Hohokam communities around present-day Gila Bend. Regular and extensive social and economic connections are apparent in pottery distributions and in stunning similarities in petroglyph iconography around Patayan and Hohokam settlements.

Another connection to Patayan and Hohokam communities is a transit route where Patayan I ceramic pieces in the shape of droplets were recovered during an excavation. This took place at the Fort Yuma Indian Reservation by the Lower Colorado River. These droplets indicate a transit route between the Hohokam and the Patayan through a small canyon that went from the Lower Colorado River to the upper terraces.

=== Trade ===
There's evidence of trade occurring between the Patayan culture and Hohokam found through ceramic compositional analyses. Similar clays were used to create locally produced Hohokam Buff Ware and Lower Colorado Buff Ware that dates to the first Patayan period. Lower Colorado Buff Ware could have been made with the same raw materials available to Hohokam potters. This indicates that Patayan potters used clay sources located in the river area near the Gila Bend, which was dominated by Hohokam Settlements.

Lower Colorado Buff Ware ceramics were sometimes traded to Hohokam irrigation agriculturalists at the western margin of the Hohokam territory. By A.D. 1100, the distribution of Patayan Buff Wares had shifted to the east, which was the central territory for the Hohokam. Hohokam pottery documents trade between coastal California and the Arizona desert (Ruby and Blackburn 1964).

Additionally, the Patayan were influenced at times by other cultural groups in the area. There are a few specific sites like the Patayan occupation at Willow Beach that suggest there was an extensive trade network at play that extended from the Four Corners up the Pacific Coast. Major trade routes linked the lower Colorado River with the Los Angeles Basin, and Patayan people moved steatite, turtle-shell artifacts, and possibly salt along these routes.

== Patayan Lifeways ==
In upland settings, Patayan communities were highly mobile and probably followed seasonal rounds. Encampments were small and impermanent, and people did not accumulate an abundance of traceable material culture due to their nomadic ways of life.

For Patayan communities along major waterways such as the Gila and Colorado Rivers, settlements were quite stable and long-lived. Floodwater farming supported permanent villages of dozens to hundreds of people. With residences tied so close to the floodplain, however, many of these ancestral villages were eradicated by massive floods; these ecological circumstances led these lowland Patayan farming communities to not create enduring works of public architecture.

The Patayan tradition is often divided into three phases. Patayan I (AD 700–1050) witnessed the arrival of pottery-using agricultural communities along the Colorado River. During Patayan II (1050–1500), this material culture spread outward to southern Nevada, western Arizona, and to the Salton Sea. Patayan III (1500–1900) saw the merging of large populations near the junction of the Gila and Colorado Rivers and the continued movement of people up the lower Gila River.

In Upper Patayan settings, Patayan communities were highly mobile and probably followed seasonal rounds, which is a pattern of moving from one location to another that follows different food sources and seasons throughout the year. Their settlements were small and impermanent, and there isn't a large amount of enduring material culture due to their nomadic ways of life.

=== Settlement Patterns ===
Early Patayan sites contain shallow pithouses or surface "long houses", consisting of a series of rooms arranged in a line. These homes had a pitroom at the east end, perhaps for storage or ceremonial activities. Later sites were less well defined and show loose groupings of varying house types. There has been evidence that there were also some natural rock structures and temporary housing shelters grouped together in small clusters that lends itself to the variety.

During the Patayan I phase, evidence suggests that the Patayan moved across northwestern Arizona to the Coconino Plateau. As the Patayan began to explore more land, new regional areas were labeled the Cerbat, Amacava (or the Mojave), Prescott, and Cohonina. Material culture ascribed to the Patayan I stage of occupation indicate that these groups were mainly hunter-gatherers, and used limited farming techniques and systems to support their main subsistence patterns. This period's migratory patterns show a more mobile lifestyle with periods of limited summer farming and mesquite harvesting by rivers and streams.

== Archaeology ==
The name "Patayan" comes from the Quechan language and means "old people". Alternative terms have been proposed for the culture group. The archaeological record of the Patayan is poorly understood. Archaeologist Malcolm Rogers first identified the Patayan, publishing a definition and chronology in 1945. His survey identified hundreds of desert sites. The harsh environment limits archaeological fieldwork and there are few remains to find. Most Patayan people appear to have been very mobile and did not build large structures or accumulate many possessions. Patayan sites may have raised crops.

Significant archaeological remains of Patayan cultures appear near 875 A.D. and many cultural characteristics continued into historic times. The Patayan Culture may have originally emerged along the Colorado River, extending from the area around modern Kingman northeast to the Grand Canyon. These people appear to have practiced floodplain agriculture, a conclusion based on the discovery of manos and metates used to process corn in these areas. Stone points and other tools for hunting and hide preparation have been found, suggesting an economy based both on agriculture and hunting and gathering.

== Culture and art ==
The Patayan made both baskets and pottery. Ceramics were apparently not adopted until 700 A.D. Patayan pottery is primarily plain ware, visually resembling the "Alma Plain" of the Mogollon. However, these pots were made using the paddle-and-anvil method, and the forms are more reminiscent of Hohokam ware. The use of paddle-and-anvil construction suggests that people from or influenced by the Hohokam first settled in this territory. Lowland Patayan pottery is made of fine, buff-colored riverine clays, while the upland Patayan pottery is more coarse and a deeper brown. Painted ware, sometimes using red slips, appear heavily influenced by the styles and designs of neighboring cultures.

=== Pottery ===
Patayan pottery has been known to be classified into two distinct manufactures: "Lowland Patayan" pottery and "Upland Patayan" pottery. "Lowland Patayan" is related to the manufacturers of Lower Colorado Buff Ware, and "Upland Patayan" is related to the manufacturers of Tizon Brown Ware in southern California, Lower California, and northwestern Arizona. These classifications indicate the close cultural interrelationships of the populations manufacturing these two ceramic wares. Lower Colorado Buff Ware was manufactured by the River Yuman tribes and by the Shoshonean Chemehuevi. Tizon Brown Ware was made by the Shoshonean Cahuilla, CupeEio, and Luiseño, as well as by upland Yuman tribes.

Lowland Patayan Ceramic Tradition encompasses a variety of ceramic classifications. Due to a multitude of similarities in manufacture, vessel form, and surface treatment of this pottery, these ceramics have been classified as Yuman pottery, Lower Colorado Buff Ware, Lower Colorado River Buff Ware, and Colorado River Ware. There have been a plethora of difficulties in creating a firm typology/classification system for these ceramics due to its complex history. Historic Lowland Patayan pottery cannot be attributed to any one cultural, ethnic, tribal, or linguistic group; to avoid equating this ceramic technology and tradition with a single cultural group or linguistic family, Lowland Patayan Ceramic Tradition is the traditionally adopted terminology used to discuss ceramics and pottery found across Baja California and parts of Colorado.

=== Religious Figurines ===
Anthropomorphic figurines were recovered at an Orange County excavation site circa 1964–1965. Twelve figurines were recovered while conducting a pedestrian survey of a 20-30 meter area.. 11 of them are Buff Ware that has no inclusions, and made from pure silt collected at the Colorado River Basin. The last effigy had inclusions of white quartz within its matrix. This type of Buff Ware is found in California's Transverse Ranges. There are marks where noses and eyes had been. The anthropomorphic figures are body effigies with no legs extending outward. There are 11 females and one male represented. Some of their eyes are shaped like cacao or coffee beans. Coffee or cacao representation shows trade and influences from Mesoamerica. Trade from Patayan in the Colorado Basin reached tribes in what today is considered Orange County. They are typical of Patayan I styles of pottery and ceramic.

Patayan style petroglyphs at a site within the Colorado Rock Desert (Site CAL-RIV-12421), were studied for patination Patina and varnish microlamination. The older the petroglyph the more patina on the surface that occurs due to weather patterns, the environment and is affected by human activity through changes in the layers of the patina. Using dating techniques like cation-ratio and varnish microlamination, the petroglyphs at the Great Basin were dated as far back as 16,500 years ago ± 1000 years through 250 years ago ± 100 years. The cation-ratio method dates the rock varnish that develops over rock art by determining the ratio of calcium and potassium to titanium (Ca + K / Ti) in the rock varnish. The petroglyphs at Site CAL-RIV-12421 fall within the post-contact period. There are petroglyphs of a horse and rider that could not have been created before 1540. The older petroglyphs consist of zoomorphic and anthropomorphic styles. The stylistic nature of these petroglyphs are influenced by Hohokam stylistic figures. The figures at the CAL-RIV-12421 site also consists of lizard men morphs, directions, and animals.

== See also ==
- List of dwellings of Pueblo peoples
- Pre-historic Southwestern cultural divisions

== Sources ==
- Cordell, Linda S. (1984). Prehistory of the Southwest. New York: Academic Press. ISBN 0-12-188220-9.
- Fagan, Brian M. (1991). Ancient North America: The Archaeology of a Continent (part five). New York: Thames and Hudson. ISBN 0-500-05075-9.
- Plog, Stephen (1997). Ancient Peoples of the American Southwest. London: Thames and Hudson. ISBN 0-500-27939-X.
