= Morphology (archaeology) =

Study of the shape of artefacts and ecofacts

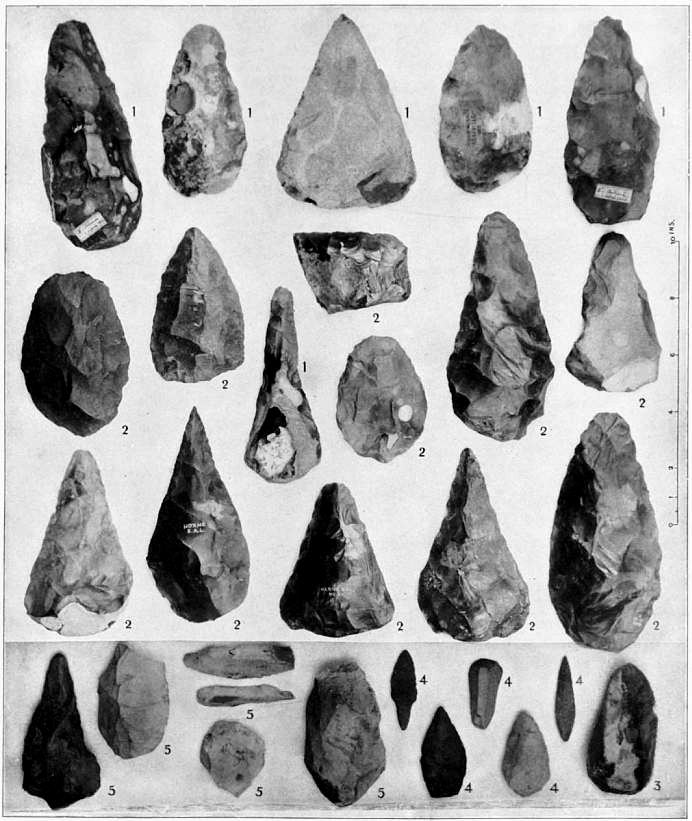
Paleolithic stone tools grouped by period, in the groups of a century ago

In archaeology, morphology is the study of the shape of artefacts and ecofacts.

Morphology is a major consideration in grouping artefacts into period styles and, despite modern techniques like radiocarbon dating, remains a crucial tool in the identification and dating not only of works of art but all classes of archaeological artefact, including purely functional ones (ignoring the question of whether purely functional artefacts exist). The term morphology ("study of shapes", from the Greek) is more often used for this. Morphological analyses of many individual artefacts are used to construct typologies for different types of artefact, and by the technique of seriation a relative dating based on shape and style for a site or group of sites is achieved where scientific absolute dating techniques cannot be used, in particular where only stone, ceramic or metal artefacts or remains are available, which is often the case. That artefacts such as pottery very often survive only in fragments makes precise knowledge of morphology even more necessary, as it is often necessary to identify and date a piece of pottery from only a few sherds.

In contrast to recent trends in academic art history, the succession of schools of archaeological theory in the last century, from culture-historical archaeology to processual archaeology and finally the rise of post-processual archaeology in recent decades has if anything increased the importance of the study of style in archaeology.
