= OCR =

OCR or ocr may refer to:

== Science and technology ==
- Optical character recognition, conversion of images of text into characters
- Organically moderated and cooled reactor, a type of nuclear reactor
- Oxidizable carbon ratio dating, a method of absolute dating
- Transvaginal oocyte retrieval, a technique used in vitro fertilization
- Oil control ring, a piston ring
- Over consolidation ratio, a consolidation measurement in geotechnical engineering

== Offices of civil rights ==
- Office for Civil Rights, U.S. Department of Education
- State Office of Civil Rights, United States Department of State
- GSA Office of Civil Rights, General Services Administration
- HHS Office for Civil Rights, United States Department of Health and Human Services
- DOJ Office for Civil Rights, Office of Justice Programs

== Economics ==
- Official cash rate, the interest rate paid by banks in the overnight money market
- Optimum currency region, a theoretical optimal area where one currency would make most benefit

== Other uses ==
- Original cast recording, a recording of a stage musical featuring the show's original cast
- Otago Central Railway, a heritage railway in Otago, New Zealand
- Ottawa Central Railway, a Canadian short-line railroad operating from 1998 to 2008
- OverClocked ReMix, an organization and website dedicated to preserving and paying tribute to video game music through re-orchestration and reinterpretation
- Cambridge OCR, an exam board in England, Wales and Northern Ireland
- Obstacle course racing

== See also ==
- OCR-A and OCR-B, fonts designed to simplify optical character recognition
