= Chronometric dating =

Method of archaeological dating

Chronometric dating is a process of archaeological and geological age determination. Often confused with Absolute dating, Chronometric dating measures time through consistent natural processes (such as the degradation of the C14 atom) and provides a date range, not an absolute date, to the dated event.

== Luminescence dating ==
=== Thermoluminescence ===
Thermoluminescence dating also dates items to the last time they were heated. This technique is based on the principle that all objects absorb radiation from the environment. This process frees electrons within minerals that remain caught within the item.

== Amino acid dating ==
Amino acid dating is a dating technique used to estimate the age of a specimen in paleobiology, archaeology, forensic science, taphonomy, sedimentary geology and other fields. This technique relates changes in amino acid molecules to the time elapsed since they were formed. All biological tissues contain amino acids. All amino acids except glycine (the simplest one) are optically active, having an asymmetric carbon atom. This means that the amino acid can have two different configurations, "D" or "L" which are mirror images of each other.

With a few important exceptions, living organisms keep all their amino acids in the "L" configuration. When an organism dies, control over the configuration of the amino acids ceases, and the ratio of D to L moves from a value near 0 towards an equilibrium value near 1, a process called racemization. Thus, measuring the ratio of D to L in a sample enables one to estimate how long ago the specimen died.
