= VML =

VML may refer to:

- Varnish microlamination, a dating methodology
- Vastus medialis longus, the muscle
- Vector Markup Language, an obsolete XML-based file format for two-dimensional vector graphics
- Veturimiesten liitto, a trade union representing train drivers in Finland
- vml, the ISO 639-3 for Malgana language
- VML (agency), an agency formed when agencies Wunderman Thompson and VMLY&R merged
  - VMLY&R, one of VML’s predecessors, formed from Young & Rubicam and the original VML
- Deportation of VML a 2-year-old American citizen who was deported in April, 2025
