= Etch =

Etch may refer to:

- to carry out an etching process
- Etch (protocol), a network protocol
- Etch (Toy Story), a character from the film Toy Story
- Etch, the codename of version 4.0 of the Debian Linux operating system
- East Tennessee Children's Hospital
