= Eching =

There are several municipalities called Eching in Bavaria, Germany

- Eching, Freising, a municipality in Freising district, near Munich
- Eching am Ammersee, a municipality in Landsberg district, near Munich
- Eching, Landshut, a municipality in Landshut district

== See also ==
- Etching (disambiguation)
