= Geochronology =

Science of determining the age of rocks, sediments and fossils

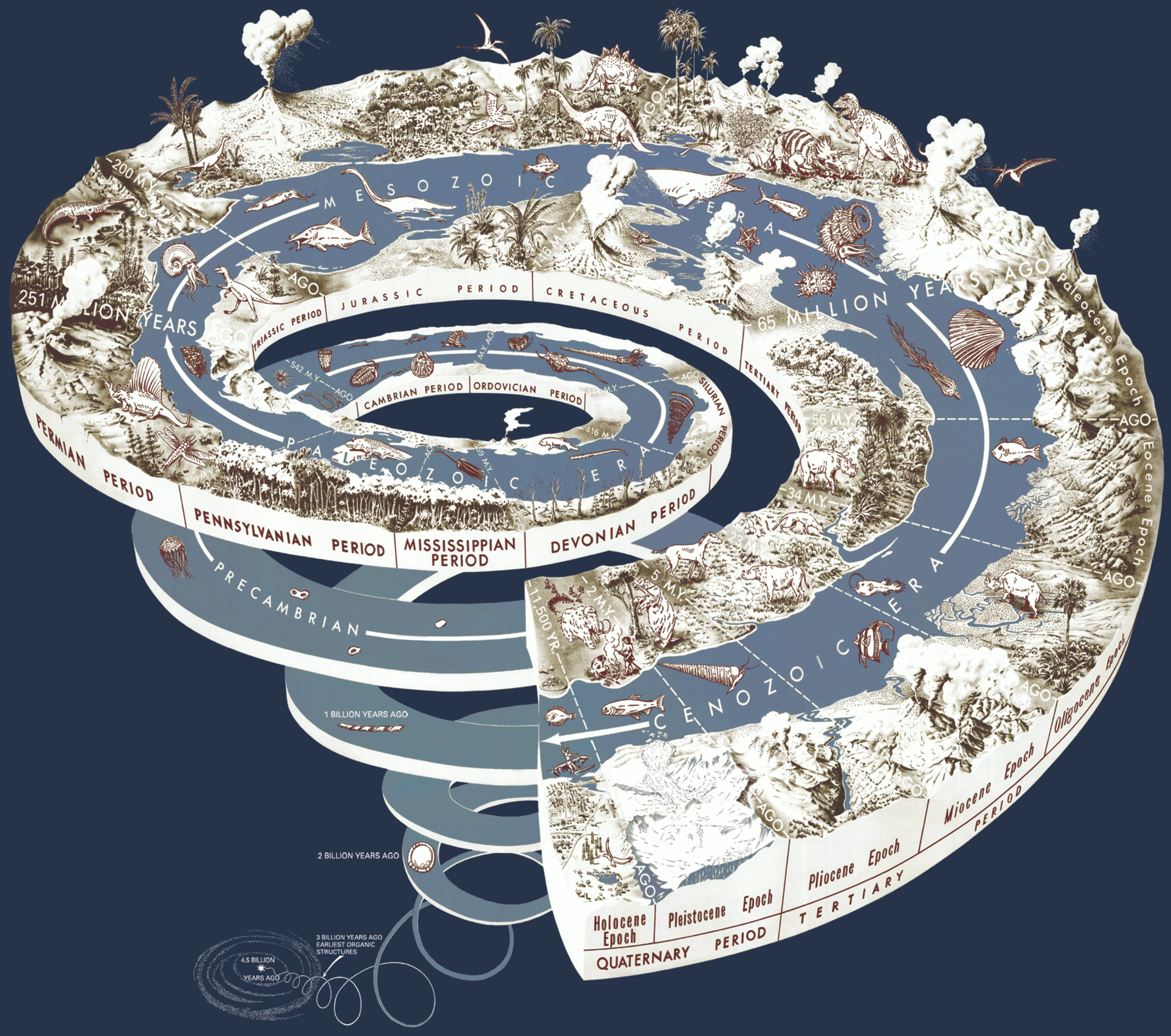
An artistic depiction of the major events in the history of Earth

Geochronology is the science of determining the age of rocks, fossils, and sediments using signatures inherent in the rocks themselves. Absolute geochronology can be accomplished through radioactive isotopes, whereas relative geochronology is provided by tools such as paleomagnetism and stable isotope ratios. By combining multiple geochronological (and biostratigraphic) indicators the precision of the recovered age can be improved.

Geochronology is different in application from biostratigraphy, which is the science of assigning sedimentary rocks to a known geological period via describing, cataloging and comparing fossil floral and faunal assemblages. Biostratigraphy does not directly provide an absolute age determination of a rock, but merely places it within an interval of time at which that fossil assemblage is known to have coexisted. Both disciplines work together hand in hand, however, to the point where they share the same system of naming strata (rock layers) and the time spans utilized to classify sublayers within a stratum.

The science of geochronology is the prime tool used in the discipline of chronostratigraphy, which attempts to derive absolute age dates for all fossil assemblages and determine the geologic history of the Earth and extraterrestrial bodies.

== Dating methods ==
Units in geochronology and stratigraphy
Segments of rock (strata) in chronostratigraphy	Time spans in geochronology	Notes to geochronological units
Eonothem	Eon	4 total, half a billion years or more
Erathem	Era	10 defined, several hundred million years
System	Period	22 defined, tens to ~one hundred million years
Series	Epoch	38 defined, tens of millions of years
Stage	Age	101 defined, millions of years
Chronozone	Chron	subdivision of an age, not used by the ICS timescale

=== Radiometric dating ===
By measuring the amount of radioactive decay of a radioactive isotope with a known half-life, geologists can establish the absolute age of the parent material. A number of radioactive isotopes are used for this purpose, and depending on the rate of decay, are used for dating different geological periods. More slowly decaying isotopes are useful for longer periods of time, but less accurate in absolute years. With the exception of the radiocarbon method, most of these techniques are actually based on measuring an increase in the abundance of a radiogenic isotope, which is the decay-product of the radioactive parent isotope. Two or more radiometric methods can be used in concert to achieve more robust results. Most radiometric methods are suitable for geological time only, but some such as the radiocarbon method and the ^{40}Ar/^{39}Ar dating method can be extended into the time of early human life and into recorded history.

Some of the commonly used techniques are:

- Radiocarbon dating. This technique measures the decay of carbon-14 in organic material and can be best applied to samples younger than about 60,000 years.
- Uranium–lead dating. This technique measures the ratio of two lead isotopes (lead-206 and lead-207) to the amount of uranium in a mineral or rock. Often applied to the trace mineral zircon in igneous rocks, this method is one of the two most commonly used (along with argon–argon dating) for geologic dating. Monazite geochronology is another example of U–Pb dating, employed for dating metamorphism in particular. Uranium–lead dating is applied to samples older than about 1 million years.
- Uranium–thorium dating. This technique is used to date speleothems, corals, carbonates, and fossil bones. Its range is from a few years to about 700,000 years.
- Potassium–argon dating and argon–argon dating. These techniques date metamorphic, igneous and volcanic rocks. They are also used to date volcanic ash layers within or overlying paleoanthropologic sites. The younger limit of the argon–argon method is a few thousand years.
- Electron spin resonance (ESR) dating

=== Cosmogenic nuclide geochronology ===
A series of related techniques for determining the age at which a geomorphic surface was created (exposure dating), or at which formerly surficial materials were buried (burial dating). Exposure dating uses the concentration of exotic nuclides (e.g. ^{10}Be, ^{26}Al, ^{36}Cl) produced by cosmic rays interacting with Earth materials as a proxy for the age at which a surface, such as an alluvial fan, was created. Burial dating uses the differential radioactive decay of 2 cosmogenic elements as a proxy for the age at which a sediment was screened by burial from further cosmic rays exposure.

=== Luminescence dating ===
Luminescence dating techniques observe 'light' emitted from materials such as quartz, diamond, feldspar, and calcite. Many types of luminescence techniques are utilized in geology, including optically stimulated luminescence (OSL), cathodoluminescence (CL), and thermoluminescence (TL). Thermoluminescence and optically stimulated luminescence are used in archaeology to date 'fired' objects such as pottery or cooking stones and can be used to observe sand migration.

=== Amino acid dating ===
Amino acid dating is a dating technique that measures ratios of amino acid isomers in fossils to determine their age. Amino acid dating cannot produce numerical age estimates on its own, requiring site-specific calibration from other dating methods, but it is relatively cheap. The preserved protein needed to perform this analysis is most easily found in shell-bearing organisms, and so this technique is often used in the investigation of ocean sediments.

=== Incremental dating ===
Incremental dating techniques allow the construction of year-by-year annual chronologies, which can be fixed (i.e. linked to the present day and thus calendar or sidereal time) or floating.

- Dendrochronology
- Ice cores
- Lichenometry
- Varves

=== Paleomagnetic dating ===
A sequence of paleomagnetic poles (usually called virtual geomagnetic poles), which are already well defined in age, constitutes an apparent polar wander path (APWP). Such a path is constructed for a large continental block. APWPs for different continents can be used as a reference for newly obtained poles for the rocks with unknown age. For paleomagnetic dating, it is suggested to use the APWP in order to date a pole obtained from rocks or sediments of unknown age by linking the paleopole to the nearest point on the APWP. Two methods of paleomagnetic dating have been suggested: (1) the angular method and (2) the rotation method. The first method is used for paleomagnetic dating of rocks inside of the same continental block. The second method is used for the folded areas where tectonic rotations are possible.

=== Magnetostratigraphy ===
Magnetostratigraphy determines age from the pattern of magnetic polarity zones in a series of bedded sedimentary and/or volcanic rocks by comparison to the magnetic polarity timescale. The polarity timescale has been previously determined by dating of seafloor magnetic anomalies, radiometrically dating volcanic rocks within magnetostratigraphic sections, and astronomically dating magnetostratigraphic sections.

=== Chemostratigraphy ===
Global trends in isotope compositions, particularly carbon-13 and strontium isotopes, can be used to correlate strata.

=== Correlation of marker horizons ===
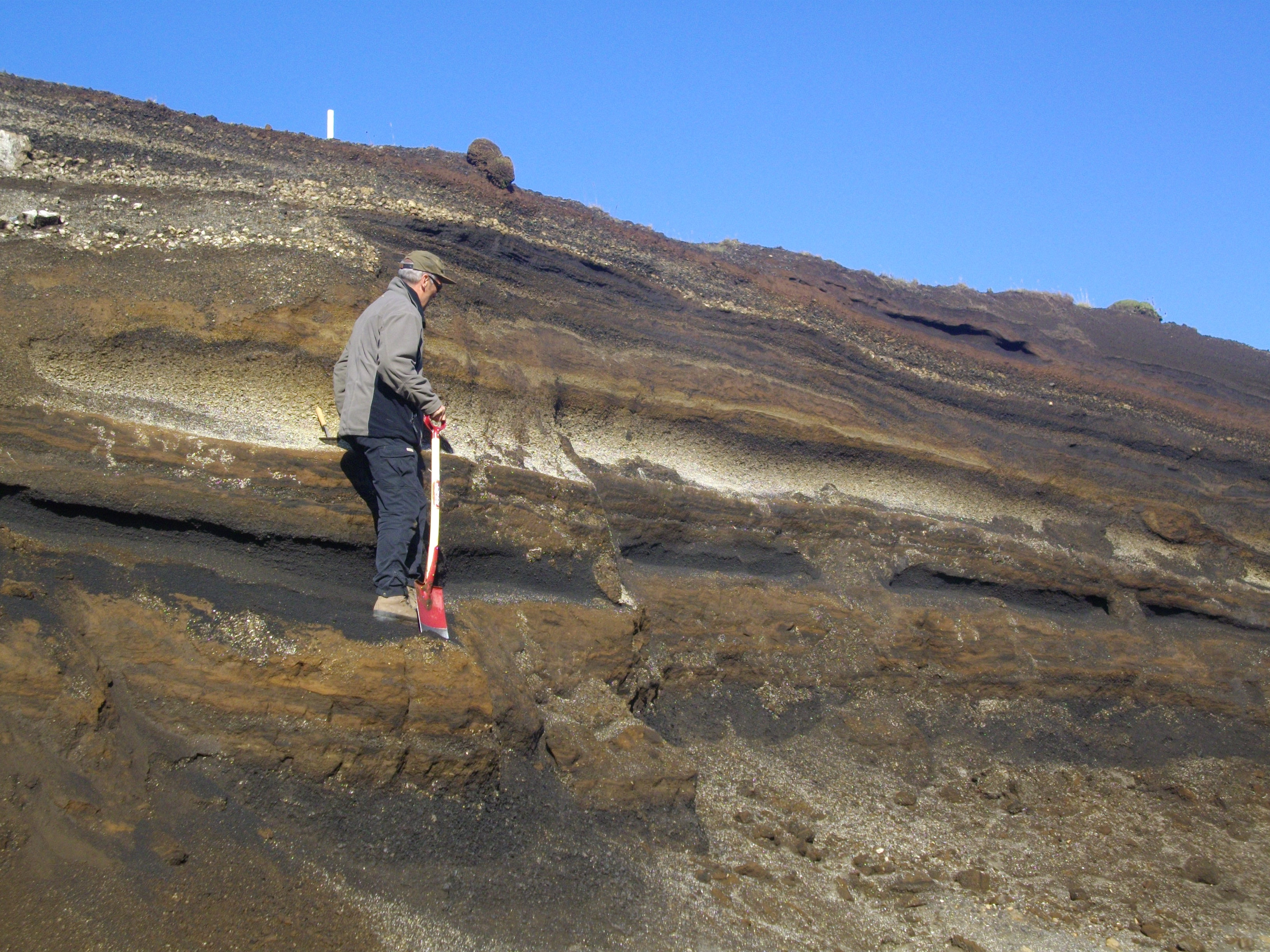
Tephra horizons in south-central Iceland. The thick and light-to-dark coloured layer at the height of the volcanologist's hands is a marker horizon of rhyolitic-to-basaltic tephra from Hekla.

Marker horizons are stratigraphic units of the same age and of such distinctive composition and appearance that, despite their presence in different geographic sites, there is certainty about their age-equivalence. Fossil faunal and floral assemblages, both marine and terrestrial, make for distinctive marker horizons. Tephrochronology is a method for geochemical correlation of unknown volcanic ash (tephra) to geochemically fingerprinted, dated tephra. Tephra is also often used as a dating tool in archaeology, since the dates of some eruptions are well-established.

== Interval hierarchy ==
Geochronological divisions from largest to smallest:

- Eon
- Era
- Period
- Epoch
- Age
- Chron

== Differences from chronostratigraphy ==
It is important not to confuse geochronologic and chronostratigraphic units. Geochronological units are periods of time, thus it is correct to say that Tyrannosaurus rex lived during the Late Cretaceous Epoch. Chronostratigraphic units are geological material, so it is also correct to say that fossils of the genus Tyrannosaurus have been found in the Upper Cretaceous Series. In the same way, it is entirely possible to visit an Upper Cretaceous Series deposit – such as the Hell Creek deposit where the Tyrannosaurus fossils were found – but it is naturally impossible to visit the Late Cretaceous Epoch as that is a period of time.

== See also ==
- Astronomical chronology
  - Age of Earth
  - Age of the universe
- Chronological dating, archaeological chronology
  - Absolute dating
  - Relative dating
  - Phase (archaeology)
  - Archaeological association
- Geochronology
  - Closure temperature
  - Geologic time scale
  - Geological history of Earth
  - Thermochronology
  - List of geochronologic names
- General
  - Consilience, evidence from independent, unrelated sources can "converge" on strong conclusions
