= Closure temperature =

Temperature of a system, such as a mineral, at the time given by its radiometric date

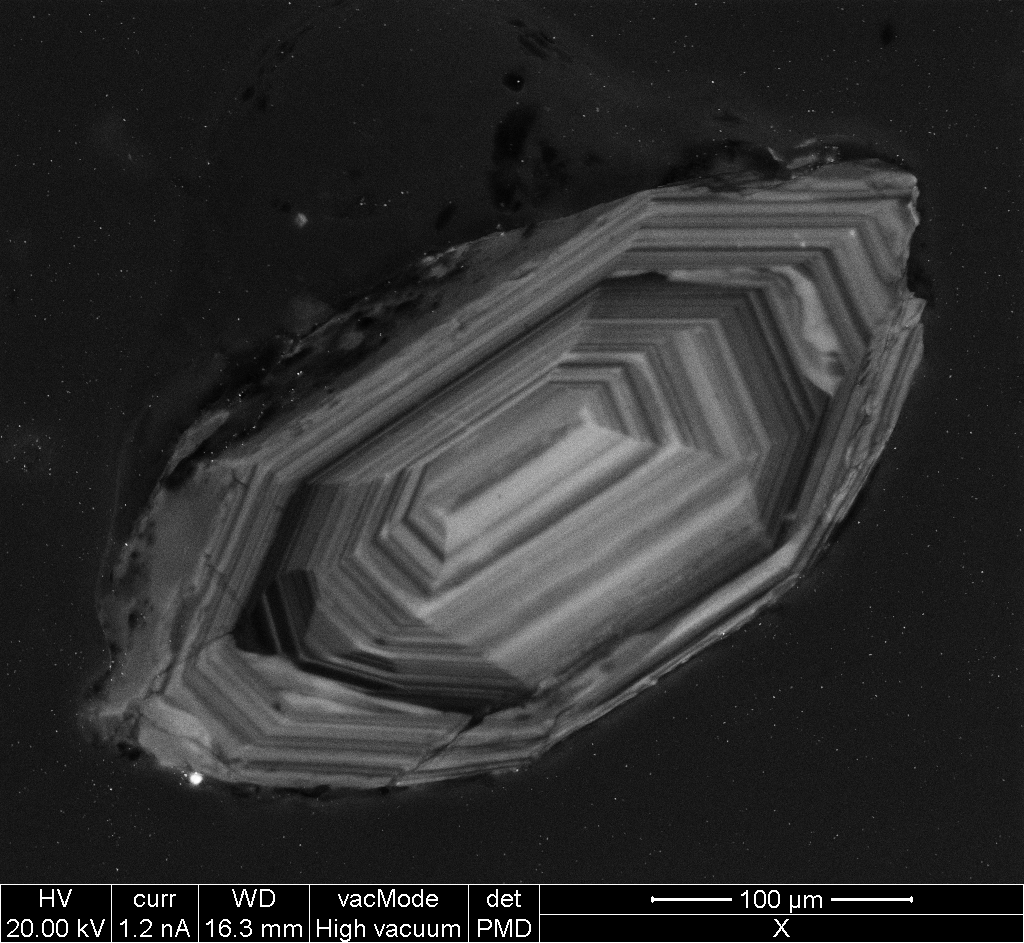
CL-SEM imaging of a zircon grain from a detrital sandstone from the Bouzergoun formation (Morocco)

In radiometric dating, closure temperature or blocking temperature refers to the temperature of a system, such as a mineral, at the time given by its radiometric date. In physical terms, the closure temperature is the temperature at which a system has cooled so that there is no longer any significant diffusion of the parent or daughter isotopes out of the system and into the external environment. The concept's initial mathematical formulation was presented in a seminal paper by Martin H. Dodson, "Closure temperature in cooling geochronological and petrological systems" in the journal Contributions to Mineralogy and Petrology, 1973, with refinements to a usable experimental formulation by other scientists in later years. This temperature varies broadly among different minerals and also differs depending on the parent and daughter atoms being considered. It is specific to a particular material and isotopic system.

The closure temperature of a system can be experimentally determined in the lab by artificially resetting sample minerals using a high-temperature furnace. As the mineral cools, the crystal structure begins to form and diffusion of isotopes slows. At a certain temperature, the crystal structure has formed sufficiently to prevent diffusion of isotopes. This temperature is what is known as blocking temperature and represents the temperature below which the mineral is a closed system to measurable diffusion of isotopes. The age that can be calculated by radiometric dating is thus the time at which the rock or mineral cooled to blocking temperature.

These temperatures can also be determined in the field by comparing them to the dates of other minerals with well-known closure temperatures.

Closure temperatures are used in geochronology and thermochronology to date events and determine rates of processes in the geologic past.

== Table of values ==
The following table represents the closure temperatures of some materials. These values are the approximate values of the closure temperatures of certain minerals listed by the isotopic system being used. These values are approximations; better values of the closure temperature require more precise calculations and characterizations of the diffusion characteristics of the mineral grain being studied.

=== Potassium-argon method ===
Mineral	Closure temperature (°C)
Hornblende	530±40
Muscovite	~350
Biotite	280±40

=== Uranium-lead method ===
Mineral	Closure temperature (°C)
Titanite	600–650
Rutile	400–450
Apatite	450–500
Zircon	>1000
Monazite	>1000

=== Electron spin resonance dating ===
Mineral	Closure temperature (°C)
Quartz (of granite)	~30-90
Baryte	190-340
