= Astronomical chronology =

Method of determining the age of events or artifacts

Astronomical chronology, or astronomical dating, is a technical method of dating events or artifacts that are associated with astronomical phenomena. Written records of historical events that include descriptions of astronomical phenomena have done much to clarify the chronology of the Ancient Near East; works of art which depict the configuration of the stars and planets and buildings which are oriented to the rising and setting of celestial bodies at a particular time have all been dated through astronomical calculations.

== Dating historical events ==
Astronomical dating can be a powerful tool for establishing absolute chronologies, but...
it can easily produce precise and impressive looking results based on invalid assumptions –
results so precise and impressive they may not be questioned by scholars in other fields.

— John Steele, "The Use and Abuse of Astronomy in Establishing Absolute Chronologies."

The use of descriptions of astronomical phenomena to date historical events began in the 16th century, a time of a renewed humanistic interest in history and of increasingly precise astronomical tables. Eclipses in particular are relatively infrequent events and can be dated precisely. When the circumstances are not exact and descriptions leave ambiguities, one can often use other details such as the month of the eclipse or the position of other stars and planets to identify the specific eclipse.

Astronomical dating, like other forms of historical interpretation, requires care in interpreting the surviving written records. John Steele has proposed three questions that must be asked when dating an event: Does the record refer to an actual astronomical event, or is this merely a modern assumption? If it does refer to an actual astronomical event, is the source reliable? Can the record provide an unambiguous date without making unwarranted assumptions about ancient astronomical observational methods?

Babylonian astronomical diaries provide detailed and unambiguous accounts of the positions of all the visible planets, often in relation to specific stars, that have been used to provide precise dates of events like the defeat of Darius III by Alexander the Great at the Battle of Gaugamela on 1 October 331 BCE and of Alexander's subsequent death on 11 June 323.

Since the success of this method depends on the reliability of the written sources and the precision of their accounts of astronomical phenomena, attempts to date literary texts which may describe astronomical events loosely or even as metaphors have led researchers to conclusions that appear precise, but rely on invalid assumptions and are consequently less widely accepted. Thus the attempts to date Vedic texts describing the Pleiades as rising "due East" to about 2300 BCE, which is the time when the Pleiades rose "exactly" due East, is complicated by the fact that poetic descriptions need not be taken as reflecting precise astronomical observations, while precession is a very slow process which makes only small changes in the azimuth of a star rising in the East.

== Dating artifacts ==
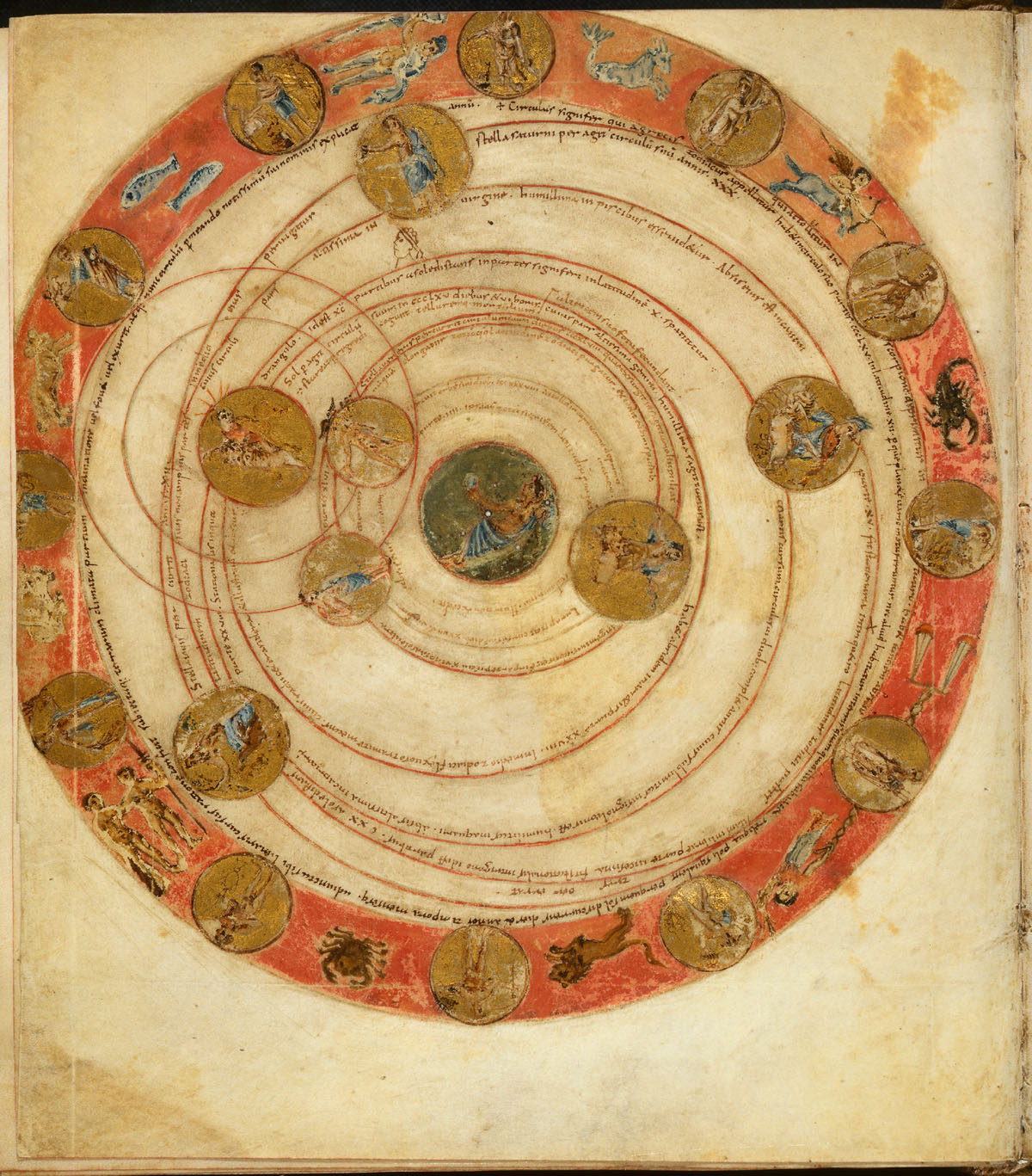
Ninth century diagram of the positions of the seven planets on 18 March 816.

Among the artifacts that can most readily be dated by astronomical techniques are depictions of the positions of the celestial bodies at a particular time. Since the motions of the celestial bodies are all at different periods, it takes many centuries for all the planets plus the Sun and the Moon, to reach the same positions in the signs of the Zodiac. For a configuration accurate to ±15° (that is, within a single sign) the positions of these seven bodies will only return to the same configuration once in about 3700 years. A particular case involved a medieval illuminated manuscript which portrayed the position of these seven celestial bodies on 18 March 816; corresponding to the period when the manuscript was written. This calculation demonstrated that this illustration was not a copy of an earlier classical depiction of the position of the stars. The rapidly moving Moon is the most sensitive indicator for the exact time; if one can estimate the indicated position of the Moon to within a degree, the time of the diagram can be computed to within an hour.

A striking example of this method was an astrological portrait of Sir Christopher Hatton (1540–1591), which depicted the positions of the seven classical planets in the zodiac and noted the computed positions of the planets to the nearest minute of arc. Here the largest source of error in the date was the uncertainty of 16th-century astronomical calculations. The resulting time was about noon of 12 December 1581.

== Dating structures by their orientation ==
A more controversial archaeoastronomical approach has been used to date structures that are believed to have been oriented on astronomical principles by measuring their orientation and computing the date in the past when a single specified celestial body, whether the Sun or a selected star, rises or sets at the measured azimuth. The astronomer Norman Lockyer applied this method to Stonehenge by measuring the orientation of the Stonehenge avenue and comparing it to the position of solstitial sunrise, which changes slowly due to the changing obliquity of the ecliptic. The archaeologist F. C. Penrose applied a similar method to ancient Greek Temples, attempting to establish their dates by relating their orientation to the appearance of stars on the horizon, the position of which changes slowly due to the precession of the equinoxes.

The wide variance of these dates from historically accepted ones led the architect and archaeologist William Bell Dinsmoor to mistrust dates established by the slowly changing obliquity of the ecliptic or by stellar alignments, which involve an arbitrary selection of a star that rises on the proper azimuth. Instead he proposed a method employing what was already known from historical records concerning the dates of construction of Greek temples, the festivals associated with specific temples, and the nature of the Greek Lunisolar calendar. Since the date of a festival in the Greek lunisolar calendar only recurs on the same date in the solar calendar every eight or nineteen years, Dinsmoor identified a festival connected with a specific temple and was able to determine the exact year near the historically recorded construction date when the Sun rose in alignment with the temple on the date of the festival.

== See also ==
- Astronomical chronology
  - Age of the Earth
  - Age of the universe
- Chronological dating, archaeological chronology
  - Absolute dating
  - Relative dating
  - Phase (archaeology)
  - Archaeological association
- Geochronology
  - Geologic time scale
  - Geological history of Earth

== Bibliography ==
- Fraser, Gordon Fraser. Star Territory: Printing the Universe in Nineteenth-Century America. Material Texts. Philadelphia: University of Pennsylvania Press, 2021.
- Giovannetti-Singh, Gianamar. "Astronomical Chronology, the Jesuit China Mission, and Enlightenment History". Journal of the History of Ideas, 83(3) (2023): 487-510. https://doi.org/10.1353/jhi.2023.a901491
- Gingerich, Owen and Barbara Welther. Planetary, Lunar, and Solar Positions, A. D. 1650 to 1805, Memoirs of the American Philosophical Society, 59S. Philadelphia, 1983.
- Neugebauer, Paul V. Astronomische Chronologie (2 vols). Berlin: De Gruyter, 1929.
- Steele, John M. "The Use and Abuse of Astronomy in Establishing Absolute Chronologies", Physics in Canada/La Physique au Canada, 59 (2003): 243-248.
- Tuckerman, Bryant. Planetary, Lunar, and Solar Positions, 601 B.C. to A, D. 1, Memoirs of the American Philosophical Society, 56. Philadelphia, 1962.
- Tuckerman, Bryant. Planetary, Lunar, and Solar Positions, A. D. 2 to 1649, Memoirs of the American Philosophical Society, 59. Philadelphia, 1964.
