= Etching (disambiguation) =

Etching is a printmaking technique in art.

Etching may also refer to:

- Etching (microfabrication), a process in producing microelectronics
- Glass etching, a glass decoration technique
- Chemical milling, or industrial etching
- Photochemical machining, or photo etching

== See also ==
- Eching (disambiguation)
- Etch (disambiguation)
- Chemical weathering of rocks
- Etcher (software), a utility used for writing image files
- Ion track, or "track etching"
