= Oxidizable carbon ratio dating =

Method of dating soil and sediment

Oxidizable carbon ratio dating is a method of dating in archaeology and earth science that can be used to derive or estimate the age of soil and sediment samples up to 35,000 years old. The method is experimental, and it is not as widely used in archaeology as other chronometric methods such as radiocarbon dating.

The methodology was introduced by Archaeology Consulting Team from Essex Junction in 1992.

== Process ==
This dating method works by measuring the ratio of oxidizable carbon to organic carbon. If the sample is freshly burned there will be no oxidizable carbon because it would have all been removed by the combustion process. Over time this will change and the amount of organic carbon will decrease to be replaced by oxidizable carbon. By measuring the ratio of oxidized carbon to organic carbon (the OCR) and applying it to the following equation the age of the sample can be determined with a very low standard error.

$$\text{OCR}_\text{DATE} = \frac{\text{OCR} \times \text{Depth} \times \text{Mean temperature} \times \text{Mean rainfall}}{\text{Mean texture} \times \sqrt\text{pH}\times\sqrt{\%C}\times 14.4888}$$

== Evaluations and applications of the method ==
The OCR dating method is, like any scientific procedure, subject to testing, evaluation, and refinement.

The Oxidizable Carbon Ratio method was the subject of a Point–CounterPoint feature of the Society for American Archaeology Bulletin in 1999. In that article, Killick, Jull, and Burr suggest that the OCR method has (1) never been described in a peer-reviewed journal article, (2) that no "scientifically acceptable" demonstration of the accuracy and precision of OCR dating has been published, and (3) that the equation underlying the OCR method is questionable because of site-specific environmental factors. Frink's rejoinder to these comments points out that (1) the OCR method has indeed been described in a peer-reviewed journal article, (2) that the accuracy and precision of the method have been reported in multiple venues and that the concept of "scientifically acceptable" is context- and person-specific (and therefore a red herring), and that (3) the equation underlying the OCR method takes into account the seven factors of soil formation, and that these factors are routinely used in soil science applications without question. In the end, Frink concludes that the OCR method—like any scientific advance—warrants further study, and he points out that even the now venerable "scientifically acceptable" method of radiocarbon dating was much maligned when it was first introduced.

Frink and others have published multiple studies demonstrating that OCR dates can correlate well with radiocarbon dates (see list of published references provided below). Fullen's study of the Sarah Peralta site in Louisiana found that the OCR method served as an effective means of inferring time at the site in the absence of radiometrically dateable charcoal. He concludes that whereas debate remains concerning the OCR procedure, "the well-corroborated dates that the LSU Museum of Natural Science has had returned on material processed with OCR and conventional radiocarbon dating...the dates returned on material from Zone 3 will be considered accurate until such time that OCR dating is proven invalid." (ibid. p. 65)

The OCR method has been used in a large number of archaeological and geomorphological studies, and an incomplete list of published references is provided below. It has been used to evaluate soil development in a range of temperature regimes including arid, semi-arid, thermic, mesic, and frigic. It has also been applied to a variety of landforms including stratified fluvial deposits, desert pavements and vesicular soils, and glacial deposits. Analyses also include monumental earthworks and geoglyphs.

== Published references ==
Abbott, James T., Raymond Mauldin, Patience E. Patterson, W. Nicholas Trierweiler, Robert J. Hard, Christopher R. Lintz, and Cynthia L. Tennis 1997 Significance Standards for Prehistoric Archeological Sites at Fort Bliss: A Design for Further Research and the Management of Cultural Resources. TRC Mariah Associates Inc. Austin, Texas. pp 70–71.

Bradbury, Andrew P. 1995 A National Register Evaluation of Twelve Sites in Adair, Cumberland and Metcalfe Counties, Kentucky. Contract Publication Series 95–69. Cultural Resource Analysts, Inc., Lexington, Kentucky.

Burkett, Kenneth 1999 Prehistoric Occupations at Fishbasket. Pennsylvania Archaeologist 69(1):1-100.

Cable, John S., Kenneth F. Styer, and Charles E. Cantley n.d. Data Recovery Excavations at the Maple Swamp (38HR309) and Big Jones (38HR315) Sites on the Conway Bypass. Horry County, South Carolina: Prehistoric Sequence and Settlement on the North Coastal Plain of South Carolina. New South Associates, Inc., Stone Mountain, Georgia. Submitted to the South Carolina Department of Transportation, Columbia, South Carolina.

Cantley, Charles E., Leslie E. Raymer, Johannes H. N. Loubser, and Mary Beth Reed 1997 Phase III Data Recovery at Four Prehistoric Sites in the Horton Creek Reservoir Project Area, Fayette County, Georgia. New South Associates, Inc., Stone Mountain, Georgia. Submitted to Mallett & Associates, Inc., Smyrna, Georgia.

Cantley, Charles E., Lotta Danielsson-Murphy, Thad Murphy, Undine McEvoy, Leslie E. Raymer, John S. Cable, Robert Yallop, Cindy Rhodes, Mary Beth Reed, and Lawerence A. Abbott 1997 Fort Polk, Louisiana: A Phase I Archaeological Survey of 14,622 Acres in Vernon Parish. New South Associates, Inc., Stone Mountain, Georgia. Submitted to the National Park Service, Atlanta, Georgia.

Childress, Mitchell R. and Guy G. Weaver In Prep. (1998) National Register Eligibility Assessment of Four Sites on Upper Roubidoux Creek (23PU483, 23PU458, 23PU354, 23PU264), Fort Leonard Wood, Missouri. Brockington and Associates, Inc., Memphis. Submitted to the United States Army Construction engineering Research Laboratories (USACERL), Champaign, Illinois.

Dorn, Ronald I., Edward Stasack, Diane Stasack, and Persis Clarkson 2001 Analyzing Petroglyphs and Geoglyphs with Four New Perspectives: Evaluating What's There and What's Not. American Indian Rock Art 27: 77–96.

Elliott, Rita F., Johannes H. N. Loubser, Leslie E. Raymer, Mary Beth Reed, and Charles E. Cantley 1995 Archaeological Testing of Three Sites Along the SR 21, Effingham and Screven Counties, Georgia. New South Associates, Inc., Stone Mountain, Georgia. Submitted to the Georgia Department of Transportation, Atlanta, Georgia.

Frink, Douglas S. and Ronald I. Dorn 2001 Beyond Taphonomy: Pedogenic Transformations of the Archaeological Record in Monumental Earthworks. Journal of the Arizona-Nevada Academy of Science 33(3): 182–202.

Frink, Douglas S. and Timothy K. Perttula 2001 Analysis of the 39 Oxidizable Carbon Ratio Dates from Mound A, Mound B, and the Village Area at the Calvin Davis or Morse Mounds Site (41SY27). North American Archaeologist 22(2): 143–160.

Fullen, Steven R. 2005 Temporal Trends in Tchula Period Pottery in Louisiana. Unpublished MA thesis, Department of Geography and Anthropology, Louisiana State University and Agricultural and Mechanical College.

Gunn, Joel D, Thomas G. Lilly, Cheryl Claassen, John Byrd, and Andrea Brewer Shea 1995 Archaeological Data Recovery Investigations at Sites 38BU905 and 38BU921 Along the Hilton Head Cross Island Expressway, Beaufort County, South Carolina. Garrow & Associates, Inc., Raleigh, North Carolina.

Harrison, Rodney, and Frink, Douglas S. 2000 The OCR Carbon Dating Procedure in Australia: New Dates from Wilinyjibari Rockshelter, Southeast Kimberley, Western Australia. Australian Archaeology 51:6-15.

Hoffman, Curtiss, Maryanne MacLeod, and Alan Smith 1999 Symbols in Stone: Chiastolites in New England Archaeology. Bulletin of the Massachusetts Archaeological Society 60(1).

Johnson, Jay K., Gena M. Aleo, Rodney T. Stuart, and John Sullivan 1998 The 1996 Excavations at the Batesville Mounds: A Woodland Period Platform Mound Complex in Northwest Mississippi. Submitted to the Panola County Industrial Authority.

Keith, Scot 1998 OCR Dating of Prehistoric Features at the Sandhill Site (22-WA-676), Southeast Mississippi. Mississippi Archaeology. 33(2): 77–114

Killick, D.J., A.J.T. Jull, and G.S. Burr 1999 Point/Counterpoint: Failure to Discriminate: Querying Oxidizable Carbon Ratio (OCR) Dating. SAA Bulletin 17(5):32-36. Response: Frink, Douglas S.

Kindall, Sheldon 1997 The Oxidizable Carbon Ratio (OCR) Technique: A New, Low-Cost Dating Method. The Steward: Collected Papers on Texas Archeology 4:91-94.

Messick, Denise P., Johannes Loubser, Theresa M. Hamby, Joe W. Joseph, Mary Beth Reed, and Leslie Raymer n.d. Prehistoric and Historic Excavations at Site 9Gw347, Annistown Road Improvement Project, Gwinnett County, Georgia. New South Associates, Inc., Stone Mountain Georgia. Submitted to the Gwinnett County Department of Transportation, Lawrenceville, Georgia and Moreland Altobelli Associates, Atlanta, Georgia.

Nami, Hugo, and Frink, Douglas S. 1999 Cronologia Obtenida por la Tasa del Carbono Organico Oxidable (OCR) en Markatch Aike 1 (Cuenca del Rio Chico, Santa Cruz). Anales del Instituo de la Patagonia 27:231-237

Patterson, Leland W. 1998 Oxidizable Carbon Ration Dating. La Tierra: Journal of the Southern Texas Archaeological Association 25(1):46-48.

n.d. Dates for Formation of Huntington Mound, Fort Bend Co., Texas. Submitted to Houston Archeological Society Journal

Patterson, L.W., J.D. Hudgins, S.M. Kindall, W.L. McClure, and S.D. Pollan 1995 Excavations at Site 41WH24, Wharton Co., Texas. Journal of the Houston Archeological Society 113:11-21.

Patterson, L.W., J.D. Hudgins, W.L. McClure 1996 Additional Excavations at Marik Site, Wharton Co., Texas. Journal of the Houston Archeological Society 115:9-15.

Patterson, L.W., S.D. Hemming, and W.L. McClure 1997 Investigations at Site 41FB245, Fort Bend County, Texas. Fort Bend Archeological Society 5.

Perttula, Timothy K., Douglas S. Frink 2001 Results of Recent Oxidizable Carbon Ratio Dating at Lake Naconiche Sites. East Texas Archaeological Society Newsletter 8(6):3-5

Perttula, Timothy K., Mike Turner, and Bo Nelson 1997 Radiocarbon and Oxidizable Carbon Ratio Dates from the Camp Joy Mound (41UR144) in Northeast Texas. Caddoan Archeology 7(4):10-16.

Perttula, Timothy K. 1997 A Compendium of Radiocarbon and Oxidizable Carbon Ratio Dates from Archaeological Sites in East Texas, with a Discussion of the Age and Dating of Select Components and Phases. Radiocarbon 39(3): 305–342.

Saunders, Joe W., Rolfe D. Mandel, Roger T. Saucier, E. Thurman Allen, C.T. Hallmark, Jay K. Johnson, Edwin H. Jackson, Charles M. Allen, Gary L. Stringer, Douglas S. Frink, James K. Feathers, Stephen Williams, Kristen J. Gremillion, Malcolm F. Vidrine, and Reca Jones 1997 A Mound Complex in Louisiana at 5400-5000 Years Before Present. Science 277:1796-1799

Steen, Carl, Chrostopher Judge, and James Legg. 1995 An Archaeological Survey of the Nature Conservancy's Peachtree Rock Preserve. Diachronic Research Foundation, Columbia, S.C.

Tennis, Cynthia L. (Ed.), I. Waynne Cox, Jeffrey J. Durst, Donna D. Edmondson, Barbara A. Meissner, Steve A. Tomka, Douglas S. Frink, John G. Jones, and Rick C. Robinson 2001 Archaeological Investigations at Four San Antonio Missions: Mission Trails Underground Conversion Project. Center for Archaeological Research, The University of Texas at San Antonio, Archaeological Survey Report 297.

Webb, Paul A., and David S. Leigh 1995 Geomorphological and Archaeological Investigations of a Buried Site on the Yadkin River Floodplain. Southern Indian Studies 44:1-36.

Wesler, Kit 1997 The Wickliffe Mounds Project: Implications for Late Mississippi Period Chronology, Settlement and Mortuary Patterns in Western Kentucky. Proceedings of the Prehistoric Society 63:261-283.

2001 Excavations at Wickliffe Mounds. The University of Alabama Press, Tuscaloosa.

Worth, J.E. 1996 Upland Lamar, Vining, and Cartersville: An Interim Report from Raccoon Ridge. Early Georgia 24(1): 34–83.
