= Law of included fragments =

Clasts in a rock are older than the rock formation

The law of included fragments is a method of relative dating in geology. Essentially, this law states that clasts in a rock are older than the rock itself. One example of this is a xenolith, which is a fragment of country rock that fell into passing magma as a result of stoping. Another example is a derived fossil, which is a fossil that has been eroded from an older bed and redeposited into a younger one.

This is a restatement of Charles Lyell's original principle of inclusions and components from his 1830 to 1833 multi-volume Principles of Geology, which states that, with sedimentary rocks, if inclusions (or clasts) are found in a formation, then the inclusions must be older than the formation that contains them. For example, in sedimentary rocks, it is common for gravel from an older formation to be ripped up and included in a newer layer. A similar situation with igneous rocks occurs when xenoliths are found. These foreign bodies are picked up as magma or lava flows, and are incorporated, later to cool in the matrix. As a result, xenoliths are older than the rock which contains them.
