= Electron spin resonance dating =

Dating by measuring unpaired electrons

Electron spin resonance dating, or ESR dating, is a technique used to date materials, for which radiocarbon dating does not work well, such as minerals (e.g. carbonates, silicates, sulphates), inorganic biological materials (e.g., tooth enamel), inorganic archaeological materials (e.g., ceramics) and certain foods. Electron spin resonance dating was first introduced to the science community in 1975, when Japanese nuclear physicist Motoji Ikeya dated a speleothem in Akiyoshi Cave, Japan. ESR dating measures the amount of unpaired electrons in crystalline structures that were previously exposed to natural radiation. The age of a substance can be determined by measuring the dosage of radiation since the time of its formation.

== Applications ==
Electron spin resonance dating is being used in fields like radiation chemistry, biochemistry, and as well as geology, archaeology, and anthropology. ESR dating is used instead of radiocarbon dating or radiometric dating because ESR dating can be applied on materials different from other methods, as well as covering different age ranges. ESR dating has been used to date fossilised teeth. The dating of buried human teeth has served as the basis for the dating of human remains. Studies have been used to date burnt flint and quartz found in certain ancient ceramics. ESR dating has been widely applied to date hydrothermal vents and sometimes to mine minerals. Newer ESR dating applications include dating previous earthquakes from fault gouge, past volcanic eruptions, tectonic activity along coastlines, fluid flow in accretionary prisms, and cold seeps.

ESR dating can be applied to newly formed materials or previously heated samples, as long the heating is below the closure temperature or the heating time is much shorter than the characteristic decay time. The closure temperature of quartz in granite is about 30–90 °C and of barite is about 190–340 °C for ESR dating.

== Dating process ==
Electron spin resonance dating can be described as trapped charge dating. Radioactivity causes negatively charged electrons to move from a ground state, the valence band, to a higher energy level at the conduction band. After a short time, electrons eventually recombine with the positively charged holes left in the valence band. The trapped electrons form para-magnetic centers and give rise to certain signals that can be detected by ESR spectrometry. The amount of trapped electrons corresponds to the magnitude of the ESR signal. This ESR signal is directly proportional to the number of trapped electrons in the mineral, the dosage of radioactive substances, and the age.

== Calculating the ESR age ==
The electron spin resonance age of a substance is found from the following equation:

$D_E = \int_{0}^{T} D(t).dt$

where D_{E} is the equivalent dose, or paleodose (in Gray or Gy), i.e. the amount of radiation a sample has received during the time elapsed between the zeroing of the ESR clock (t = 0) and the sampling (t = T). D(t) is the dose rate (usually in Gy/ka or microGy/a), which is the average dose absorbed by the sample in 1000 or 1 years. If D(t) is considered constant over time, then, the equation may be expressed as follows:

$T = D_E/D$

In this scenario, T is the age of the sample, i.e. the time during which the sample has been exposed to natural radioactivity since the ESR signal has been last reset. This happens by releasing the trapped charge, i.e. usually by either dissolution/recrystallization, heat, optical bleaching, or mechanical stress.

=== Determining the accumulated dose ===
The accumulated dose is found by the additive dose method and by an electron spin resonance (ESR) spectrometry. This when a sample is put into an external magnetic field and irradiated with certain dosages of microwaves that changes the energy level of the magnetic centers (changes the spin rotation) either to the same or opposite of the surrounding magnetic field. The change in magnetic properties only happens at specific energy levels and, for certain microwave frequencies, there are specific magnetic strengths that cause these changes to occur (resonance). Positioning an ESR line in a spectrum corresponds to the proportion (g-value) of the microwave frequency to magnetic field strength used in the spectrometry. As the extrapolation toward zero of the ESR intensity occurs, the accumulated dose can then be determined.

=== Determining the annual dose rate ===
The dose rate is found from the summation of the concentrations of radioactive materials in the sample (internal dose rate) and its surrounding environment (external dose rate). The dosages of internal and external radioactivity must be calculated separately because of the varying differences between the two.

Factors to include in calculating the radioactivity:

- Uranium, thorium and potassium concentration
- Energies for alpha, beta, and gamma rays of uranium-238 and thorium-232
- Correction factors related to the water content, the geometry of the sample, its thickness and density
- Cosmic ray dose rates – dependent on geographical position and thickness of covering sediments (300 pGy/a at sea level)

== Reliability ==
Trapped electrons only have a limited time frame when they are within the intermediate energy level stages. After a certain time range, or temperature fluctuations, trapped electrons will return to their energy states and recombine with holes. The recombination of electrons with their holes is only negligible if the average life is ten times higher than the age of the sample being dated. New heating events may erase previous ESR ages so in environments with multiple episodes of heating, such as in hydrothermal vents, maybe only newly formed minerals can be dated with ESR dating but not older minerals. This explains why samples from the same hydrothermal vent may give different ESR ages. In environments with multiple phases of mineral formation, generally, ESR dating gives the average age of the bulk mineral while radiometric dates are biased to the ages of younger phases because of the decay of parent nuclei.

== See also ==
- Electron paramagnetic resonance
