= Cementochronology =

Cementochronology is a method for assessing age at death and determining season at death. This technique is employed as accurate indicator of age among wildlife biologists on present and archaeological populations but is increasingly used in forensic anthropology and physical anthropology.

Cementochronology is a subdiscipline of the field of study called skeletochronology which is a subdiscipline of the broader field called sclerochronology.

== Principle ==
Cementochronology is based on the assumption that dental cementum deposits reflect an annual rhythm and involves the counting of incremental lines in histological preparations.

This incremental structure has been reported in the dental cementum of marine and terrestrial mammals. When viewed under light microscopy, a specific type of cementum (Acellular Extrinsic Fibers Cementum - AEFC) surrounding the root appears as layers of alternating dark and light bands.

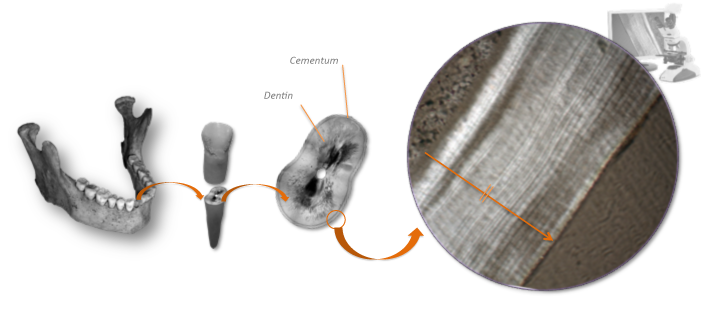

One pair composed of a single light and a single dark line is considered to represent one calendar year and age estimation is calculated by adding the average age of tooth eruption to the line count determined. The age-at-death of an individual is estimated by adding this count to the average age of tooth eruption.

== History ==
Cementochronology was first used in zoology for estimating both age-at-death and season of death. Then, cementochronology has been successfully implemented in bioarchaeology. In an investigation yet based on nonhuman mammalian, Mina and Klevezal established in human teeth the considerable interest for archaeologists, anthropologists, and forensic pathologists. It took 12 years to reproduce the experiment on other human teeth. Since, this technique has a particular interest for physical and forensic anthropologists because counting cementum deposits would give a direct access to chronological age and some studies performed on cementum have shown a correlation reaching 0.98 between incremental lines in the cementum and known age at death.

== Technique ==
Different protocols are used depending on the field and the period. On present teeth, classical histological methods are often used and require decalcification of the dental tissue and staining protocol for collagen. In archaeology where collagen can be poorly preserved, tooth root is embedded in an epoxy resin and dried in a vacuum chamber. On human teeth, the crown and the upper third of the root are removed. 100-μm, non-decalcified cross sections are prepared from the middle third of the root using a Low Speed Saw fitted with a diamond-coated blade. The polishing of both faces can be performed to remove cutting marks. Each slice is washed and sections are mounted on slides. Observations are conducted using an optical microscope at ×400 magnification. Segments that showed readable cementum layers are captured with a digital camera and readings are performed on selected segments.

== Critical evaluation ==
The destruction of the tooth is the first inconvenient of this technique especially in the fields of archaeology and paleontology where non-invasive techniques are preferred. This technic also suffers from the fact that the physiological and structural biological background of cementum is not well elucidated. The alternating deposits could be regulated under genetic factors but could be influenced by biomechanical and physiological factors in link with nutrition and/or environment.

Nonetheless, studies performed on cementum annulation have shown a strong correlation between the deposits the known age-at-death and allow to estimate adult age-at-death with a better precision than classical dental and osseous methods. Cementochronology narrow down the age at death estimations in zoology, bioarchaeology and forensic sciences.
