= Relative dating =

Determining the relative order of past events

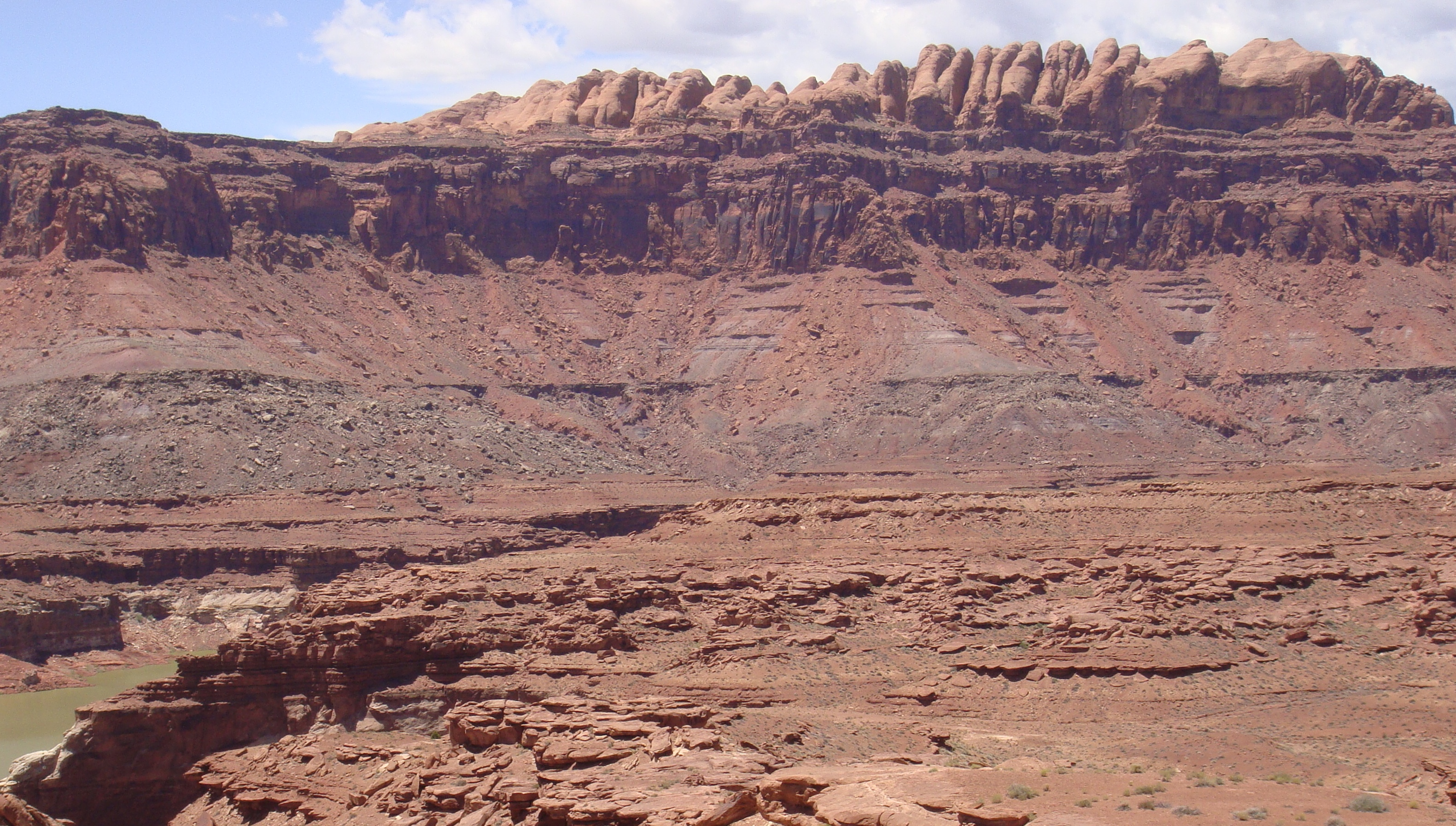
The Permian through Jurassic stratigraphy of the Colorado Plateau area of southeastern Utah is a great example of Original Horizontality and the Law of Superposition, two important ideas used in relative dating. These strata make up much of the famous prominent rock formations in widely spaced protected areas such as Capitol Reef National Park and Canyonlands National Park. From top to bottom: Rounded tan domes of the Navajo Sandstone, layered red Kayenta Formation, cliff-forming, vertically jointed, red Wingate Sandstone, slope-forming, purplish Chinle Formation, layered, lighter-red Moenkopi Formation, and white, layered Cutler Formation sandstone. Photo from Glen Canyon National Recreation Area, in Utah.

Relative dating is the science of determining the relative order of past events (i.e., the age of an object in comparison to another), without necessarily determining their absolute age (i.e., estimated age). In geology, rock or superficial deposits, fossils and lithologies can be used to correlate one stratigraphic column with another. Prior to the discovery of radiometric dating in the early 20th century, which provided a means of absolute dating, archaeologists and geologists used relative dating to determine ages of materials. Though relative dating can only determine the sequential order in which a series of events occurred, not when they occurred, it remains a useful technique. Relative dating by biostratigraphy is the preferred method in paleontology and is, in some respects, more accurate. The Law of Superposition, which states that older layers will be deeper in a site than more recent layers, was the summary outcome of "relative dating" as observed in geology from the 17th century to the early 20th century.

== Geology ==
The common order of the occurrence of fossils in rock layers was discovered around 1800 by William Smith. While digging the Somerset Coal Canal in Southwest England, he found that fossils were always in the same order in the rock layers. As he continued his job as a surveyor, he found the same patterns across England. He also found that certain animals were in only certain layers, and that they were in the same layers all across England. Due to that discovery, Smith was able to recognize the order that the rocks were formed. Sixteen years after his discovery, he published a geological map of England showing the rocks of different geologic time eras.

=== Principles of relative dating ===
Methods for relative dating were developed when geology first emerged as a natural science in the 18th century. Geologists still use the following principles today as a means to provide information about geologic history and the timing of geologic events.

==== Uniformitarianism ====
The principle of Uniformitarianism states that the geologic processes observed in operation that modify the Earth's crust at present have worked in much the same way over geologic time. A fundamental principle of geology advanced by the 18th century Scottish physician and geologist James Hutton, is that "the present is the key to the past." In Hutton's words: "the past history of our globe must be explained by what can be seen to be happening now."

==== Intrusive relationships ====
The principle of intrusive relationships concerns crosscutting intrusions. In geology, when an igneous intrusion cuts across a formation of sedimentary rock, it can be determined that the igneous intrusion is younger than the sedimentary rock. There are a number of different types of intrusions, including stocks, laccoliths, batholiths, sills and dikes.

==== Cross-cutting relationships ====
Cross-cutting relations can be used to determine the relative ages of rock strata and other geological structures. Explanations: A – folded rock strata cut by a thrust fault; B – large intrusion (cutting through A); C – erosional angular unconformity (cutting off A & B) on which rock strata were deposited; D – volcanic dyke (cutting through A, B & C); E – even younger rock strata (overlying C & D); F – normal fault (cutting through A, B, C & E).

The principle of cross-cutting relationships pertains to the formation of faults and the age of the sequences through which they cut. Faults are younger than the rocks they cut; accordingly, if a fault is found that penetrates some formations but not those on top of it, then the formations that were cut are older than the fault, and the ones that are not cut must be younger than the fault. Finding the key bed in these situations may help determine whether the fault is a normal fault or a thrust fault.

==== Inclusions and components ====
The principle of inclusions and components explains that, with sedimentary rocks, if inclusions (or clasts) are found in a formation, then the inclusions must be older than the formation that contains them. For example, in sedimentary rocks, it is common for gravel from an older formation to be ripped up and included in a newer layer. A similar situation with igneous rocks occurs when xenoliths are found. These foreign bodies are picked up as magma or lava flows, and are incorporated, later to cool in the matrix. As a result, xenoliths are older than the rock which contains them.

==== Original horizontality ====
The principle of original horizontality states that the deposition of sediments occurs as essentially horizontal beds. Observation of modern marine and non-marine sediments in a wide variety of environments supports this generalization (although cross-bedding is inclined, the overall orientation of cross-bedded units is horizontal).

==== Superposition ====
The law of superposition states that a sedimentary rock layer in a tectonically undisturbed sequence is younger than the one beneath it and older than the one above it. This is because it is not possible for a younger layer to slip beneath a layer previously deposited. The only disturbance that the layers experience is bioturbation, in which animals and/or plants move things in the layers. however, this process is not enough to allow the layers to change their positions. This principle allows sedimentary layers to be viewed as a form of vertical time line, a partial or complete record of the time elapsed from deposition of the lowest layer to deposition of the highest bed.

==== Faunal succession ====
The principle of faunal succession is based on the appearance of fossils in sedimentary rocks. As organisms exist at the same time period throughout the world, their presence or (sometimes) absence may be used to provide a relative age of the formations in which they are found. Based on principles laid out by William Smith almost a hundred years before the publication of Charles Darwin's theory of evolution, the principles of succession were developed independently of evolutionary thought. The principle becomes quite complex, however, given the uncertainties of fossilization, the localization of fossil types due to lateral changes in habitat (facies change in sedimentary strata), and that not all fossils may be found globally at the same time.

==== Lateral continuity ====
Schematic representation of the principle of lateral continuity

The principle of lateral continuity states that layers of sediment initially extend laterally in all directions; in other words, they are laterally continuous. As a result, rocks that are otherwise similar, but are now separated by a valley or other erosional feature, can be assumed to be originally continuous.

Layers of sediment do not extend indefinitely; rather, the limits can be recognized and are controlled by the amount and type of sediment available and the size and shape of the sedimentary basin. Sediment will continue to be transported to an area and it will eventually be deposited. However, the layer of that material will become thinner as the amount of material lessens away from the source.

Often, coarser-grained material can no longer be transported to an area because the transporting medium has insufficient energy to carry it to that location. In its place, the particles that settle from the transporting medium will be finer-grained, and there will be a lateral transition from coarser- to finer-grained material. The lateral variation in sediment within a stratum is known as sedimentary facies.

If sufficient sedimentary material is available, it will be deposited up to the limits of the sedimentary basin. Often, the sedimentary basin is within rocks that are very different from the sediments that are being deposited, in which the lateral limits of the sedimentary layer will be marked by an abrupt change in rock type.

==== Inclusions of igneous rocks ====
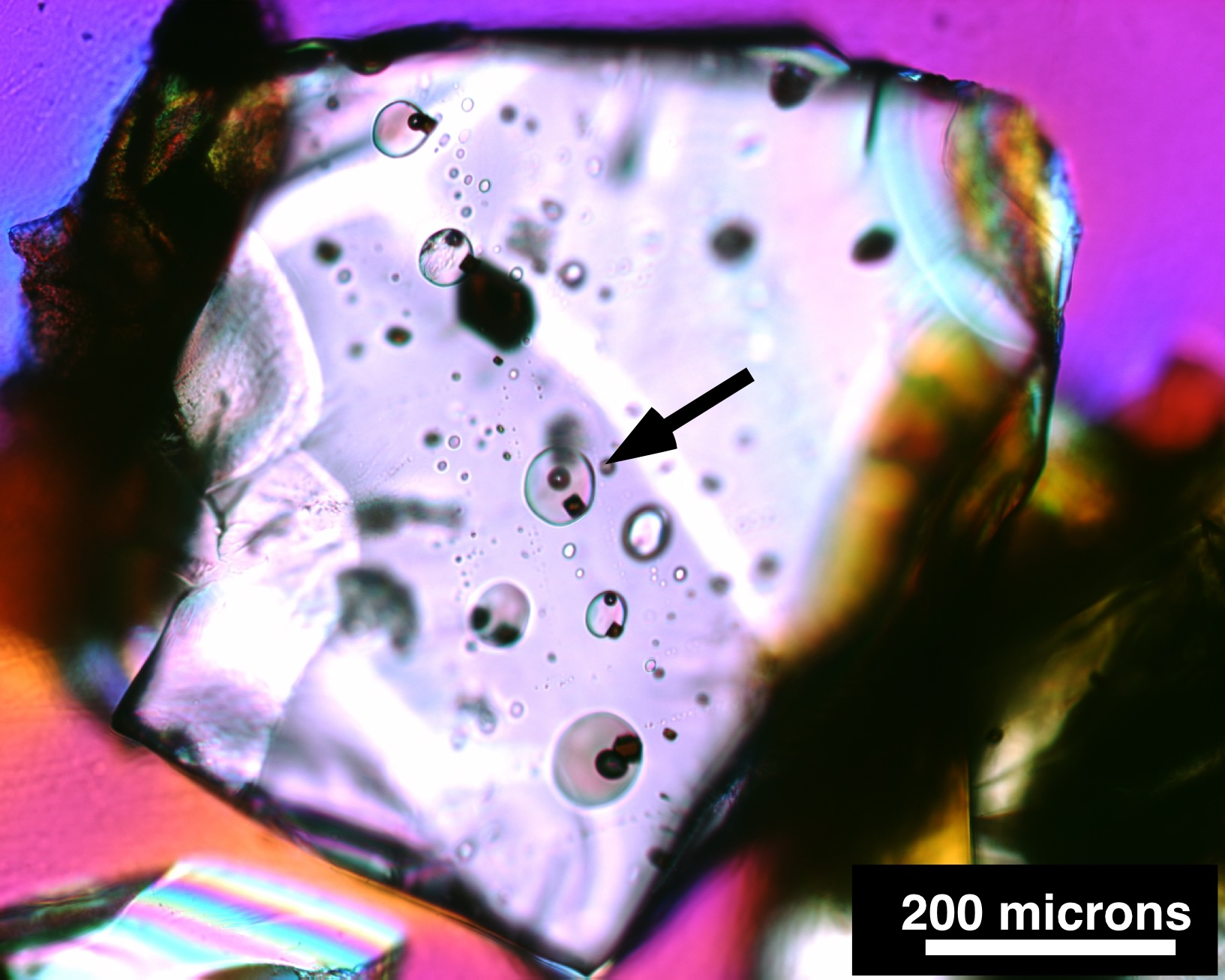
Multiple melt inclusions in an olivine crystal. Individual inclusions are oval or round in shape and consist of clear glass, together with a small round vapor bubble and in some cases a small square spinel crystal. The black arrow points to one good example, but there are several others. The occurrence of multiple inclusions within a single crystal is relatively common

Melt inclusions are small parcels or "blobs" of molten rock that are trapped within crystals that grow in the magmas that form igneous rocks. In many respects they are analogous to fluid inclusions. Melt inclusions are generally small – most are less than 100 micrometres across (a micrometre is one thousandth of a millimeter, or about 0.00004 inches). Nevertheless, they can provide an abundance of useful information. Using microscopic observations and a range of chemical microanalysis techniques geochemists and igneous petrologists can obtain a range of useful information from melt inclusions. Two of the most common uses of melt inclusions are to study the compositions of magmas present early in the history of specific magma systems. This is because inclusions can act like "fossils" – trapping and preserving these early melts before they are modified by later igneous processes. In addition, because they are trapped at high pressures many melt inclusions also provide important information about the contents of volatile elements (such as H_{2}O, CO_{2}, S and Cl) that drive explosive volcanic eruptions.

Sorby (1858) was the first to document microscopic melt inclusions in crystals. The study of melt inclusions has been driven more recently by the development of sophisticated chemical analysis techniques. Scientists from the former Soviet Union lead the study of melt inclusions in the decades after World War II (Sobolev and Kostyuk, 1975), and developed methods for heating melt inclusions under a microscope, so changes could be directly observed.

Although they are small, melt inclusions may contain a number of different constituents, including glass (which represents magma that has been quenched by rapid cooling), small crystals and a separate vapour-rich bubble. They occur in most of the crystals found in igneous rocks and are common in the minerals quartz, feldspar, olivine and pyroxene. The formation of melt inclusions appears to be a normal part of the crystallization of minerals within magmas, and they can be found in both volcanic and plutonic rocks.

==== Included fragments ====
The law of included fragments is a method of relative dating in geology. Essentially, this law states that clasts in a rock are older than the rock itself. One example of this is a xenolith, which is a fragment of country rock that fell into passing magma as a result of stoping. Another example is a derived fossil, which is a fossil that has been eroded from an older bed and redeposited into a younger one.

This is a restatement of Charles Lyell's original principle of inclusions and components from his 1830 to 1833 multi-volume Principles of Geology, which states that, with sedimentary rocks, if inclusions (or clasts) are found in a formation, then the inclusions must be older than the formation that contains them. For example, in sedimentary rocks, it is common for gravel from an older formation to be ripped up and included in a newer layer. A similar situation with igneous rocks occurs when xenoliths are found. These foreign bodies are picked up as magma or lava flows and are incorporated later to cool in the matrix. As a result, xenoliths are older than the rock which contains them.

=== Planetology ===
Relative dating is used to determine the order of events on Solar System objects other than Earth; for decades, planetary scientists have used it to decipher the development of bodies in the Solar System, particularly in the vast majority of cases for which we have no surface samples. Many of the same principles are applied. For example, if a valley is formed inside an impact crater, the valley must be younger than the crater.

Craters are very useful in relative dating; as a general rule, the younger a planetary surface is, the fewer craters it has. If long-term cratering rates are known to enough precision, crude absolute dates can be applied based on craters alone; however, cratering rates outside the Earth-Moon system are poorly known.

== Ecology ==
Dating the layers of bird nests made from plastic pollution can be done by checking the expiration date on food packaging. By doing so, a stratigraphy emerges, documenting the history of the breeding site and reflecting all earlier breeding attempts. A nest found in Amsterdam found in 2021 could be traced back all the way to the early 90s. The oldest nest item was a Mars bar advertising the 1994 FIFA World Cup. Single-use packages of perishable products like 'fresh milk' or a 'ripe avocado' proved to be very precise marker in time referring not only to the year but also to the near exact date it was most likely consumed. Non-food or nonperishable, shelf-stable products, could result in less precise dating.

== Archaeology ==
Relative dating methods in archaeology are similar to some of those applied in geology. The principles of typology can be compared to the biostratigraphic approach in geology.

== See also ==
- Astronomical chronology
  - Age of the Earth
  - Age of the universe
- Chronological dating, archaeological chronology
  - Absolute dating
  - Relative dating, this article
  - Phase (archaeology)
  - Archaeological association
  - Archaeological context
  - Archaeological culture – Group of artifact types and structure layouts that often occur together
  - Relationship (archaeology)
  - Sequence
  - Seriation (archaeology) – Archaeological method of relative dating
- Geochronology
  - Chronostratigraphy
    - Marker horizon
    - Thermochronology
    - Stratigraphy
    - Structural geology
    - Unconformity
  - Geologic time scale
    - Geological history of Earth
    - Future of the Earth
  - Plate tectonics
    - Plate reconstruction
  - Timeline of natural history
  - List of geochronologic names
- General
  - Consilience, evidence from independent, unrelated sources can "converge" on strong conclusions

== Citations ==
- "Biostratigraphy: William Smith". Understanding Evolution. 2009. University of California Museum of Paleontology. 23 January 2009 <http://evolution.berkeley.edu/evolibrary/article/0_0_0/history_11>
- Monroe, James S., and Reed Wicander. The Changing Earth: Exploring Geology and Evolution, 2nd ed. Belmont: West Publishing Company, 1997. ISBN 0-314-09577-2
