= Varnish microlamination =

Geological phenomenon

Rock varnish microlamination is a geological phenomenon in which a "varnish" or dark coating builds up on rock surfaces that are exposed to the atmosphere. It is the world's slowest-accumulating sedimentary deposit at around ~1 μm per 1000 years. It can be used for dating the host rock; it is particularly well preserved and therefore useful in arid and semi-arid regions.

The microlaminations can be observed when varnish is shaved thin enough (5-10 μm) to see through with a light microscope. Dark layers in the varnish are rich in manganese and barium, but poor in silicon and aluminium. Orange and yellow layers are poor in Mn and Ba, but rich in Si and Al.

There is also a growing body of evidence that indicates varnish microstratigraphy carries a climate record: manganese-poor yellow layers formed during dry periods, while mangangese-rich black layers deposited during wet periods.
