= Absolute dating =

Process of determining an age on a specified chronology in archaeology and geology

Absolute dating is the process of determining an age on a specified chronology in archaeology and geology. Absolute dating provides a numerical age or range, in contrast with relative dating, which places events in order without any measure of the age between events. Some scientists prefer the terms chronometric dating or calendar dating, as the use of the word "absolute" may imply an unwarranted certainty of accuracy.

In archaeology, absolute dating is usually based on the physical, chemical, and life properties of the materials of artifacts, buildings, or other items that have been modified by humans and by historical associations with materials with known dates (such as coins and historical records). For example, coins found in excavations may have their production date written on them, or there may be written records describing the coin and when it was used, allowing the site to be associated with a particular calendar year. Absolute dating techniques include radiocarbon dating of wood or bones, potassium-argon dating, and trapped-charge dating methods such as thermoluminescence dating of glazed ceramics.

In historical geology, the primary methods of absolute dating involve using the radioactive decay of elements trapped in rocks or minerals, including isotope systems from younger organic remains (radiocarbon dating with ^{14}C) to systems such as uranium–lead dating that allow determination of absolute ages for some of the oldest rocks on Earth.

== Dendrochronology ==
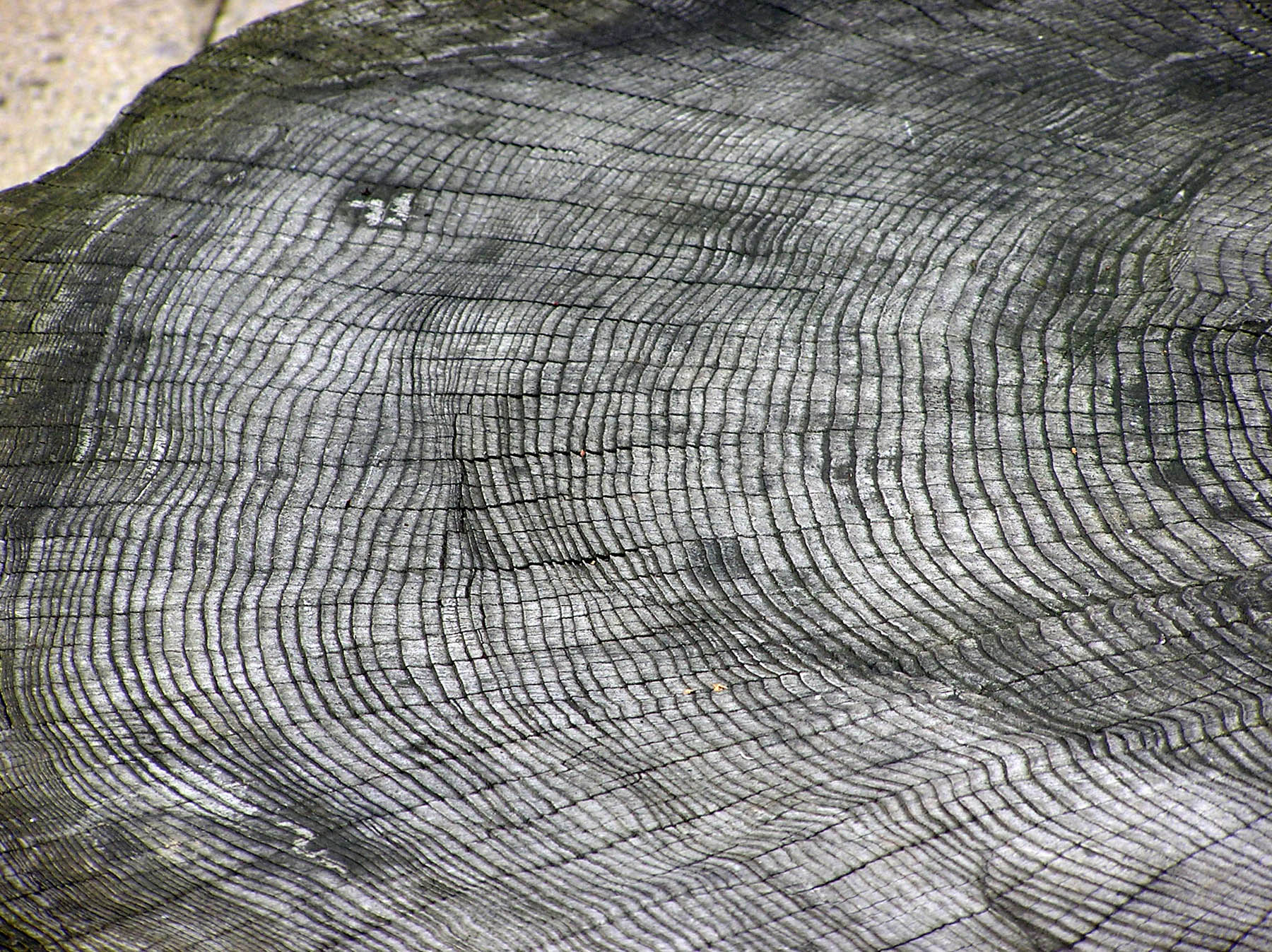
The growth rings of a tree at Bristol Zoo, England. Each ring represents one year; the outside rings, near the bark, are the youngest.

Dendrochronology, or tree-ring dating, is the scientific method of dating based on the analysis of patterns of tree rings, also known as growth rings. Dendrochronology can date the time at which tree rings were formed, in many types of wood, to the exact calendar year.

Dendrochronology has three main areas of application: paleoecology, where it is used to determine certain aspects of past ecologies (most prominently climate); archaeology, where it is used to date old buildings, etc.; and radiocarbon dating, where it is used to calibrate radiocarbon ages (see below).

In some areas of the world, it is possible to date wood back a few thousand years, or even many thousands. Currently, the maximum for fully anchored chronologies is a little over 11,000 years from present.

== See also ==
- Astronomical chronology
  - Age of the Earth
  - Age of the universe
- Chronological dating, archaeological chronology
  - Absolute dating, this article
  - Relative dating
  - Phase (archaeology)
  - Archaeological association
- Geochronology
  - Chronostratigraphy
  - Future of the Earth
  - Geologic time scale
  - Geological history of Earth
  - Plate reconstruction
  - Plate tectonics
  - Thermochronology
  - Timeline of natural history
  - List of geochronologic names
- General
  - Consilience, evidence from independent, unrelated sources can "converge" on strong conclusions
