= K–Ar dating =

Radiometric dating method

Potassium–argon dating, abbreviated K–Ar dating, is a radiometric dating method used in geochronology and archaeology. It is based on the measurement of the product of the radioactive decay of potassium-40 (^{40}K) into argon (Ar). Potassium is a common element in many materials, such as feldspars, micas, clay minerals, tephra, and evaporites. In these materials, the decay product ^{40}Ar can escape the liquid (molten) rock but starts to accumulate when the rock solidifies (recrystallizes). The amount of argon sublimation that occurs is a function of the sample's purity, the composition of the mother material, and several other factors. These factors introduce error limits on the upper and lower bounds of dating so that the final determination of age is reliant on the environmental factors during formation, melting, and exposure to decreased pressure or open air. Time since recrystallization is calculated by measuring the ratio of the amount of ^{40}Ar accumulated to the amount of ^{40}K remaining. The long half-life of ^{40}K allows the method to be used to calculate the absolute age of samples older than a few thousand years.

The quickly cooled lavas that make nearly ideal samples for K–Ar dating also preserve a record of the direction and intensity of the local magnetic field as the sample cooled past the Curie temperature of iron. The geomagnetic polarity time scale was calibrated largely using K–Ar dating.

== History ==
Radioactivity was discovered at the end of the 19th century, and by the early years of the 20th century it was known that some minerals were radioactive and that radioactive decay caused some elements to transmute into other elements. In 1905 Ernest Rutherford suggested that since helium was a byproduct of the decay of uranium, it might be possible to determine the age of rocks that contained uranium by measuring how much helium had been produced. In the same year, Bertram Boltwood suggested that radioactive uranium transmuted into lead, and proposed a geological dating mechanism on that basis. Over the next few years it became understood that an element might exist as different isotopes, and during the 1920s two isotopes of potassium were discovered: ^{39}K and ^{41}K. By the late 1930s a third isotope, ^{40}K, had been identified; it was known to be radioactive, decaying to ^{40}Ca, an isotope of calcium.

In 1937 C. F. Von Weizsäcker proposed that ^{40}K might also decay into ^{40}Ar (argon), and that this would explain the abundance of ^{40}Ar in the earth's atmosphere. Attempts were made to prove the theory by looking for excess argon in minerals, but early experiments did not measure the isotopic ratio of the argon that was found, which meant the excess could not be detected. In 1948, L. T. Aldrich and A. O. Nier tested four old minerals and found the ratio of ^{40}Ar to ^{36}Ar to be higher than the atmospheric ratio in each case.

This made it clear that argon isotope ratios could be used to determine the age of rocks: since argon is a noble gas, it does not form compounds, so any argon found in rock comes from the decay of potassium or from atmospheric contamination. Argon atoms, which have a radius of 1.9 Å, are too large to pass through most crystal lattices, so when a rock crystallizes argon stops being able to pass through it. This means that the amount of trapped argon in a rock sample is a measurement of how long it has been since the rock last crystallized.

== Physical details and calculations ==
Potassium naturally occurs in three isotopes: ^{39}K and ^{41}K are stable, and ^{40}K is radioactive, with a half-life of 1.266×10^{9} years. ^{40}K is the least abundant of the three, constituting only 0.0117% of present-day potassium. Because ^{40}K is radioactive, its abundance will decrease over time: in 16 million years it will be one percent less abundant than it is today, and it was correspondingly more abundant in the past. There are four different decay paths for ^{40}K. The most common path is via electron emission to ^{40}Ca, which accounts for 89.59% of decay events. The other three paths all produce ^{40}Ar, mainly through electron capture.

The equation governing the decay of a radioactive isotope is

$$N = N_0 \, e^{-\lambda t}\,$$

where N_{0} is the number of atoms of the isotope in the original sample and N is the number of atoms of that isotope left after time t. λ is a constant that depends on the particular isotope; for a given isotope it is equal to the reciprocal of the mean-life—i.e. the average or expected time a given atom will survive before undergoing radioactive decay. If an isotope decays into two different isotopes, as ^{40}K does, the number of atoms of the original isotope is equal to the remaining original atoms of the isotope, plus the number of atoms of the decay products. For ^{40}K this means that

$N_0 = K + A + C$

where K, A and C represent the number of atoms in the present day sample of ^{40}K, ^{40}Ar and ^{40}Ca. Then the decay equation can be rearranged as
$$A + C = K\left[e^{(\lambda_A + \lambda_C)t} - 1\right]$$
where λ_{A} and λ_{C} are the decay constants associated with the argon and calcium decay paths. (Note: Although there are four decay paths for ^{40}K, only two decay constants are needed in the equation, because when there are multiple decay paths each of which produces the same final isotope, as is the case with the decay of ^{40}K to ^{40}Ar, then the individual decay constants are added to produce a total decay constant.) For the purposes of calculating geological age, the amount of radiogenic calcium (that is, calcium created by radioactive decay) can be ignored, so the equation becomes

$A = K\frac{\lambda_A}{\lambda_A + \lambda_C}\left[e^{(\lambda_A + \lambda_C)t} - 1\right]$

If the values of A and K—the amount of radiogenic ^{40}Ar, and the remaining amount of ^{40}K—are measured for a rock sample, then this equation allows t, the age of the rock, to be calculated.

Substituting in the values for the decay constants, we get

$A = K \frac{0.5757 \times 10^{-10}}{0.5757 \times 10^{-10} + 4.9548 \times 10^{-10}} \left[ e^{(0.5757 \times 10^{-10} + 4.9548 \times 10^{-10})t} - 1 \right]$

which simplifies to

$A = 0.1041\,K \left[ e^{(5.5305 \times 10^{-10})t} - 1 \right]$

Solving for t:

$t = 1.808 \times 10^{9} \ln \left[ 9.607 \frac{A}{K} + 1 \right]$

For small x, ln(1 + x) is close to the value of x, so for young rocks, it is possible to simplify this further. The simplified equation becomes

$t \approx 1.737 \times 10^{10} \frac{A}{K}$

The error this introduces increases with age and is less than about 1% for rocks younger than about 40 million years.

== Dating considerations ==
The K-Ar method measures the ratio of ^{40}K in a sample to the ^{40}Ar produced by radioactive decay from the ^{40}K originally in that sample. This method can be rendered inaccurate, either by the presence in the sample of extraneous argon, defined as ^{40}Ar that was not produced by decay of the ^{40}K originally in the rock, or by the loss from the rock of the ^{40}Ar produced by the decay of the ^{40}K.

=== Excess and inherited argon ===
Extraneous argon can be divided into two kinds: excess argon, meaning argon that has penetrated the sample but did not originate there; and inherited argon, which was present before the event being dated. Excess argon can only reliably be detected if there is an independent way to measure the age of the rock, which can be done with other radiometric methods. Although argon can diffuse into some minerals, this form of error is quite rare, and can be ignored if there is other supporting evidence for the age determination. For example, deep sea basalts formed by lavas on the ocean floor are known from other evidence to be geologically recent, but ages up to 43 million years have been found from K-Ar dating these rocks. The amount of excess argon trapped in these basalts has been shown to be correlated with the ocean depth. With increasing depth comes greater pressure, and since more argon can remain dissolved in lava at higher pressure, when the lava is cooled rapidly by the ocean water, more argon is trapped in the basalt. Although it is possible for argon to diffuse into some rocks, it is thought that most excess argon is trapped at the time the mineral crystallizes.

Inherited argon can come from the sample itself or from contamination in the laboratory. Volcanic rocks often contain inclusions of older material which can contribute argon, but plutonic and metamorphic rocks are much less likely to have foreign inclusions. Contamination in the laboratory can be minimized procedurally, by cleaning the equipment thoroughly and keeping samples and equipment sealed and covered.

=== Lost argon ===
Some minerals, such as some feldspars, do not trap fully trap argon, so dating these materials will give too young an age. Argon will also be lost if a rock is melted by geological processes such as metamorphosis; after it has cooled again it wil start to trap argon once more, and K-Ar dating will then measure the recrystallization event, not the time of the rock's original formation. If the melting is partial or of short duration some of the original argon will be retained. Weathered rocks may lose some of their trapped argon, and soluble minerals will lose argon if ground water dissolves them. As with recrystallization from heating, this will cause too young an age to be determined by K-Ar dating. It is also possible that physical damage such as shock waves or radiation damage could cause rocks to lose trapped argon, but this is unlikely to cause an issue in practice as undamaged specimens are preferred for testing. Grinding a sample in the laboratory as part of the preparation for testing can also release argon from the lattice.

=== Dateable minerals ===
Extraneous argon in minerals with a high potassium content will have little impact on the accuracy of K-Ar dating, and is hard to detect. Extraneous argon in a mineral such as pyroxene, with low potassium content, has a much greater effect, and some pyroxene K-Ar testing has found dates of about 4.5 billion years, on the same order as the age of the earth.

== Measurements ==
=== Argon isotope dilution ===
The argon to be measured is extracted from the rock sample by fusing the rock in a vacuum, and separating the reactive gases. The usual method of measuring the quantity of argon in the resulting gases is isotope dilution. For an element with a single natural isotope, this method works by adding a known quantity (called a tracer) of an artificial isotope, and measuring the isotope ratio of the resulting mixture with a mass spectrometer. If there are x atoms of the natural isotope, and y atoms of the artificial isotope, and the measured ratio is R, then

$x = yR$

However, argon has three stable isotopes of argon, ^{36}Ar, ^{38}Ar, and ^{40}Ar, which means this form of the equation cannot be used. An additional complication is that the ^{40}Ar in the sample to be measured comes from two sources: the radiogenic ^{40}Ar from the decay of potassium, and some ^{40}Ar from atmospheric contamination, either from the measurement process or the inclusion of some atmospheric argon in the rock at the time it crystallized.

The tracer used for K-Ar dating is nearly pure ^{38}Ar. The calculations for isotope dilution also require a knowledge of the isotopic composition of atmospheric argon, which is 99.6% ^{40}Ar, 0.063% ^{38}Ar, and 0.337% ^{36}Ar. The following three equations are needed. In these equations, the left side, with the subscript "M", represents the quantity of that isotope measured by mass spectrometer.The subscripts "T" and "A" indicate the quantity of argon in the tracer and the atmospheric contamination, respectively. In each case—mass spectrometer measurements, tracer, and atmospheric contamination—the quantity of each isotope is the sum of the amount from atmospheric contamination and from the tracer and, for ^{40}Ar, the amount produced by the decay of ^{40}K, indicated by the subscript "rad".

${}^{40}\mathrm{Ar}_{M} = {}^{40}\mathrm{Ar}_{rad} + {}^{40}\mathrm{Ar}_{T} + {}^{40}\mathrm{Ar}_{A}$	1

${}^{38}\mathrm{Ar}_{M} = {}^{38}\mathrm{Ar}_{T} + {}^{38}\mathrm{Ar}_{A}$	2

${}^{36}\mathrm{Ar}_{M} = {}^{36}\mathrm{Ar}_{T} + {}^{36}\mathrm{Ar}_{A}$	3

The isotopic compositions of the tracer and of atmospheric argon are known, so the tracer and atmospheric terms in equations 1 and 3 can be written as multiples of the corresponding amounts of ^{38}Ar:

${}^{40}\mathrm{Ar}_{M} = {}^{40}\mathrm{Ar}_{rad} + ({}^{40}\mathrm{Ar}/{}^{38}\mathrm{Ar})_{T}\,{}^{38}\mathrm{Ar}_{T} + ({}^{40}\mathrm{Ar}/{}^{38}\mathrm{Ar})_{A}\,{}^{38}\mathrm{Ar}_{A}$	4

${}^{36}\mathrm{Ar}_{M} = ({}^{36}\mathrm{Ar}/{}^{38}\mathrm{Ar})_{T}\,{}^{38}\mathrm{Ar}_{T} + ({}^{36}\mathrm{Ar}/{}^{38}\mathrm{Ar})_{A}\,{}^{38}\mathrm{Ar}_{A}$	5

Dividing equation 2 by equation 5 gives an expression for the measured ^{38}Ar/^{36}Ar ratio, which can be solved for the amount of atmospheric ^{38}Ar:

${}^{38}\mathrm{Ar}_{A} = {}^{38}\mathrm{Ar}_{T} \left[ \frac{1 - ({}^{38}\mathrm{Ar}/{}^{36}\mathrm{Ar})_{M}\,({}^{36}\mathrm{Ar}/{}^{38}\mathrm{Ar})_{T}}{({}^{38}\mathrm{Ar}/{}^{36}\mathrm{Ar})_{M}\,({}^{36}\mathrm{Ar}/{}^{38}\mathrm{Ar})_{A} - 1} \right]$	6

Similarly, dividing equation 4 by equation 2 gives an expression for the measured ^{40}Ar/^{38}Ar ratio, which can be solved for the amount of radiogenic ^{40}Ar:

${}^{40}\mathrm{Ar}_{rad} = {}^{38}\mathrm{Ar}_{T}\,({}^{40}\mathrm{Ar}/{}^{38}\mathrm{Ar})_{M} - {}^{38}\mathrm{Ar}_{T}\,({}^{40}\mathrm{Ar}/{}^{38}\mathrm{Ar})_{T} - {}^{38}\mathrm{Ar}_{A} \left[ ({}^{40}\mathrm{Ar}/{}^{38}\mathrm{Ar})_{A} - ({}^{40}\mathrm{Ar}/{}^{38}\mathrm{Ar})_{M} \right]$	7

Substituting equation 6 into equation 7 gives the radiogenic ^{40}Ar in terms of the measured isotope ratios, the known isotope ratios of the tracer and of atmospheric argon, and the known amount of ^{38}Ar in the tracer:

$$\begin{align} {}^{40}\mathrm{Ar}_{rad} = {}^{38}\mathrm{Ar}_{T} \Bigg\{ & ({}^{40}\mathrm{Ar}/{}^{38}\mathrm{Ar})_{M} - ({}^{40}\mathrm{Ar}/{}^{38}\mathrm{Ar})_{T} \\ & - \left[ \frac{1 - ({}^{38}\mathrm{Ar}/{}^{36}\mathrm{Ar})_{M}\,({}^{36}\mathrm{Ar}/{}^{38}\mathrm{Ar})_{T}}{({}^{38}\mathrm{Ar}/{}^{36}\mathrm{Ar})_{M}\,({}^{36}\mathrm{Ar}/{}^{38}\mathrm{Ar})_{A} - 1} \right] \left[ ({}^{40}\mathrm{Ar}/{}^{38}\mathrm{Ar})_{A} - ({}^{40}\mathrm{Ar}/{}^{38}\mathrm{Ar})_{M} \right] \Bigg\} \end{align}$$	8

=== Other argon measurement methods ===
An alternative isotope dilution approach, named the Cassignol-Gillot method, does not use a tracer. For young rocks there is very little radiogenic argon, so adding a tracer makes detection of the increase in radiogenic argon harder. The additional sensitivity of the Cassignol-Gillot method alllows determination of the age of much younger rocks. For example, in 2006 Gillot and others reported the age of sanidines from southern Italy as 3840 ± 180 years, in agreement with radiocarbon dates for associated charcoal.

In 2013 an isotope dilution method was developed using a tracer enriched in both ^{39}Ar and ^{41}K. After adding the tracer, argon is extracted at a temperature below 1000 °C, and the isotope ratios measured by mass spectrometry; then the sample is heated again to produce potassium vapor, and mass spectrometry is used again to obtain the potassium isotope ratio. Together these measurements allow the calculation of the mineral age. The method was developed as a way to simplify age determination of rocks by planetary probes.

Argon measurements can also be made by volumetric or neutron activation methods, but these approaches have drawbacks and are rarely used. The volumetric methods requires the removal of other noble gases from the sample, which is a difficult operation to perform accurately. Neutron activation of argon extracted from a sample produces ^{37}Ar and ^{41}Ar, which are then be measured by mass spectrometer, but since irradiating calcium also produces these isotopes, the argon must be extracted from the rock sample first. It is difficult to reliably extract all of the argon, so the method has low accuracy compared to the isotope dilution method.

=== Potassium ===
To measure the amount of ^{40}K remaining in the sample, the total amount of potassium is measured and multiplied by the ratio of ^{40}K to total potassium. This ratio, 0.000117, is considered to be constant in all terrestrial potassium.

Measurement of the potassium in the sample is usually done by one of the following methods.

- Flame photometry. The potassium is chemically prepared by one of several methods, and atomized into a flame photometer, which measures the intensity of the characteristic radiation of potassium. In some versions of this method the radiation from lithium is also measured. These values are compared to a reference value in order to determine the concentration of potassium in the sample.
- Atomic absorption spectrometry. The potassium is prepared by methods similar to those used for flame photometry, and the absorption lines characteristic of potassium are measured.
- Isotope dilution. The principles for measuring ^{40}K by isotope dilution are the same as for argon, but the calculations are simpler because there is no need to correct for atmospheric contamination. The initial preparation of the rock sample for potassium isotope dilution is similar to the methods used for flame photometry. A tracer of potassium containing a known ratio of potassium isotopes is added to the prepared sample, and after further preparation steps a mass spectrometer is used to measure the isotope ratio of the powdered sample. The resulting ratio, along with the known isotope ratio of the tracer, allows the calculation of the ratio of isotopes in the original sample, and hence the quantity of ^{40}K in the original sample.

Less common methods of measuring potassium include

- Gravimetric analysis. There are several methods of preparation that can be used; they are slow and difficult and hence are not frequently used. The resulting precipitate may include rubidium from the original sample, so when the precipitate is weighed, another method such as flame photometry is needed to determine the quantity of rubidium so that it can be subtracted from the results.
- X-ray fluorescence. This method only provides results for material within 0.05 mm of the surface of the sample, so if the rock to be analysed is inhomogeneous it must first be converted into a uniform material. The sample is irradiated with X-rays, which excite the electrons in the sample. This produces radiation which, as with flame photometry and atomic absorption spectrometry, is characteristic of the elements in the sample. Comparison with a standard allows the quantity of potassium to be determined.
- Neutron activation. In this method, a powdered sample is irradiated with neutrons. This converts some of the ^{41}K to ^{42}K, which then decays with a half-life of about 12.4 hours to ^{42}Ca, emitting gamma rays with a characteristic energy. Measurement of this radiation, along with either the same measurement for an irradiated standard potassium sample, or a value for the neutron flux used, allows the quantity of ^{41}K in the original sample to be calculated. The relative abundance of ^{41}K is known, so from this the total quantity of potassium in the original sample can be determined.

== Accuracy ==
For a rock such as lava, cooling rapidly, the time of crystallization may be only a few hours; for other rocks, such as an intrusive igneous rock, the crystallization may take much longer, up to millions of years. Not all rocks can have their ages determined by K-Ar dating: sedimentary rocks, for example, include grains of older rocks, and a measurement taken on those grains will give the age of the original rock from which the grain was eroded, rather than the age of formation of the sedimentary rock.

=== Assumptions ===
The K-Ar dating method assumes that the decay rate of ^{40}K is constant, and is unaffected by temperature and pressure. This is an assumption common to all dating methods that depend on radioactivity. There are other assumptions that are specific to K-Ar dating:

- The method assumes that the potassium isotope ratio is constant in the rock samples being tested. Measurements of the potassium isotope ratio, including measurements of rocks of extraterrestrial origin, have shown a variation of no more than 3%. A 2021 study found a small amount of fractionation in some rocks, but the maximum effect on the accuracy of K-Ar dating was determined to be only 0.08%.
- K-Ar dating requires that the measurements of potassium and argon are done on separate samples of the rock being tested. If the rock is not homogenous, the two separate resulting measurement may lead to an inaccurate date.

=== Measurement errors ===
If an error is made in the measurement of the Ar/K ratio, the resulting error in the calculated age of the sample depends on the age of the sample (see graph).

Percent error in K–Ar age for errors in the ^{40}Ar*/^{40}K ratio

Similarly, the effect of an error in the decay constants for the argon and calcium decay paths for ^{40}K depends on the age of the sample. Here λ_{A} is the decay constant for the decay to ^{40}Ar, and λ_{C} is the decay constant for the decay to ^{40}Ca.

Percent error in K–Ar age for errors in λ_{A}

Percent error in K–Ar age for errors in λ_{C}

== Applications ==
K–Ar dating was instrumental in developing the geomagnetic polarity time scale. Although it finds the most utility in geological applications, it plays an important role in archaeology. One archeological application has been bracketing the age of archeological deposits at Olduvai Gorge by dating lava flows above and below the deposits. It has also been indispensable in other early East African sites with a history of volcanic activity such as Hadar, Ethiopia. The K–Ar method continues to have utility in dating clay mineral diagenesis. In 2017, the successful dating of illite formed by weathering was reported. This finding indirectly led to the dating of the strandflat of Western Norway from where the illite was sampled. Clay minerals are less than 2 μm thick and cannot easily be irradiated for Ar–Ar analysis because Ar recoils from the crystal lattice.

In 2013, the K–Ar method was used by the Curiosity Mars rover to date a rock on the Martian surface, the first time a rock has been dated from its mineral ingredients while situated on another planet.

== Sources ==
- Aronson, J. L.; Lee, M. (1986). "K/Ar systematics of bentonite and shale in a contact metamorphic zone". Clays and Clay Minerals. 34 (4): 483–487. Bibcode:1986CCM....34..483A. doi:10.1346/CCMN.1986.0340415.
- Bowman, Sheridan (1995) [1990]. Radiocarbon Dating. London: British Museum Press. ISBN 978-0-7141-2047-8.
- Chang, Su-Chin; Shi, Wenbei; Wang, Yinzhi; Wang, Fei (8 August 2025). "Argon-based geochronology: advances, limitations and perspectives". National Science Review. 12 (9). doi:10.1093/nsr/nwaf277. ISSN 2095-5138. PMC 12395950. PMID 40893428.
- Clauer, Norbert (2013). "The K-Ar and 40Ar/39Ar methods revisited for dating fine-grained K-bearing clay minerals". Chemical Geology. 354: 163–185. doi:10.1016/j.chemgeo.2013.05.030.
- Dalrymple, G. Brent; Lanphere, Marvin A. (1969). Potassium-Argon Dating: Principles, Techniques and Applications to Geochronology. San Francisco: W. G. Freeman & Co. ISBN 0-7167-0241-X.
- Farley, K. A.; Hurowitz, J. A.; Asimow, P. D.; Jacobson, N. S.; Cartwright, J. A. (2013). "A double-spike method for K–Ar measurement: A technique for high precision in situ dating on Mars and other planetary surfaces". Geochimica et Cosmochimica Acta. 110: 1–12. doi:10.1016/j.gca.2013.02.010.
- Gillot, Pierre-Yves; Cornette, Yves (1986). "The Cassignol technique for potassium—Argon dating, precision and accuracy: Examples from the Late Pleistocene to Recent volcanics from southern Italy". Chemical Geology: Isotope Geoscience section. 59: 205–222. doi:10.1016/0168-9622(86)90072-2.
- Gillot, Pierre-Yves; Hildebrand, Antony; Lefèvre, Jean-Claude; Albore-Livadie, Claude (2006). "The K/Ar Dating Method : Principle, Analytical Techniques, and Application to Holocene Volcanic Eruptions in Southern Italy". Acta Vulcanologica : journal of the national volcanic group of Italy (1/2). IT: Istituti Editoriali e Poligrafici Internazionali. doi:10.1400/93820.
- Glen, William (1982). The Road to Jaramillo: Critical Years of the Revolution in Earth Science. Stanford, California: Stanford University Press. ISBN 0-8047-1119-4.
- Hariasz, L.; Stukel, M.; Di Stefano, P. C. F.; Rasco, B. C.; Rykaczewski, K. P.; Brewer, N. T.; Stracener, D. W.; Liu, Y.; Gai, Z.; Rouleau, C.; Carter, J.; Kostensalo, J.; Suhonen, J.; Davis, H.; Lukosi, E. D. (31 July 2023). "Evidence for ground-state electron capture of K 40". Physical Review C. 108 (1). doi:10.1103/PhysRevC.108.014327. ISSN 2469-9985.
- Kelley, S. (1 January 2002). "K-Ar and Ar-Ar Dating". Reviews in Mineralogy and Geochemistry. 47 (1): 785–818. doi:10.2138/rmg.2002.47.17. ISSN 1529-6466.
- Kuhnel, W. Wilson; Jacobsen, Stein B.; Li, Yonghui; Ku, Yaray; Petaev, Michail I.; Huang, Shichun; Wu, Zhongqing; Wang, Kun (21 October 2021). "High-Temperature Inter-Mineral Potassium Isotope Fractionation: Implications for K–Ca–Ar Chronology". ACS Earth and Space Chemistry. 5 (10): 2740–2754. doi:10.1021/acsearthspacechem.1c00147. ISSN 2472-3452. PMC 8740525. PMID 35005332.
- McDougall, Ian; Harrison, T. Mark (1999). Geochronology and thermochronology by the ^{40}Ar/^{39}Ar method. Oxford University Press. ISBN 978-0-19-510920-7.
- Renne, Paul R.; Balco, Greg; Ludwig, Kenneth R.; Mundil, Roland; Min, Kyoungwon (2011). "Response to the comment by W.H. Schwarz et al. on "Joint determination of 40K decay constants and 40Ar∗/40K for the Fish Canyon sanidine standard, and improved accuracy for 40Ar/39Ar geochronology" by P.R. Renne et al. (2010)". Geochimica et Cosmochimica Acta. 75 (17): 5097–5100. doi:10.1016/j.gca.2011.06.021.
- Schaen, Allen J.; Jicha, Brian R.; Hodges, Kip V.; Vermeesch, Pieter; Stelten, Mark E.; Mercer, Cameron M.; Phillips, David; Rivera, Tiffany A.; Jourdan, Fred; Matchan, Erin L.; Hemming, Sidney R.; Morgan, Leah E.; Kelley, Simon P.; Cassata, William S.; Heizler, Matt T. (1 March 2021). "Interpreting and reporting 40Ar/39Ar geochronologic data". GSA Bulletin. 133 (3–4): 461–487. doi:10.1130/B35560.1. ISSN 0016-7606.
- Tattersall, I. (1995). The Fossil Trail: How We Know What We Think We Know About Human Evolution. Oxford University Press. ISBN 978-0-19-506101-7.
