= Science and the Catholic Church =

The relationship between science and the Catholic Church has included both extensive institutional patronage and support as well as periods of censorship and sharp conflict. The influential Latin Church theologian, philosopher and bishop St. Augustine (354-430) taught that God revealed Himself through the created world, which is like a "book" that is accessible to every human being regardless of literacy. In the Early Middle Ages, Catholic clergy had a near monopoly on literacy in Western Europe and were the leading scholars of natural philosophy in the Latin West. During the High Middle Ages, the Church founded Europe's first universities. During the Renaissance, a high-ranking Church official - Nicolaus Copernicus (1473-1543) - proposed that the earth circled the sun. Historians of science have documented important continuities between pre-modern Christian ideas and the birth of modern science.

During the Scientific Revolution, the Papacy and the Jesuits initially promoted the observations and studies of Galileo Galilei (1564-1642) but the Roman Inquisition later forced him to recant his views and then sentenced him to house arrest. Critics point to episodes like this, where the Church has opposed scientific findings that challenged its teachings, as evidence for a conflict thesis — the idea that there is an intrinsic and inevitable intellectual conflict between religion and science. The Catholic Church has adopted the distinction between science and salvation that Galileo himself insisted on, maintaining that there can never be real disagreement between science and theology because the "things of the world and the things of faith derive from the same God" while Pope John Paul II (r. 1978-2005) wrote that Galileo was "more perceptive" about interpreting Scripture "than the theologians who opposed him."

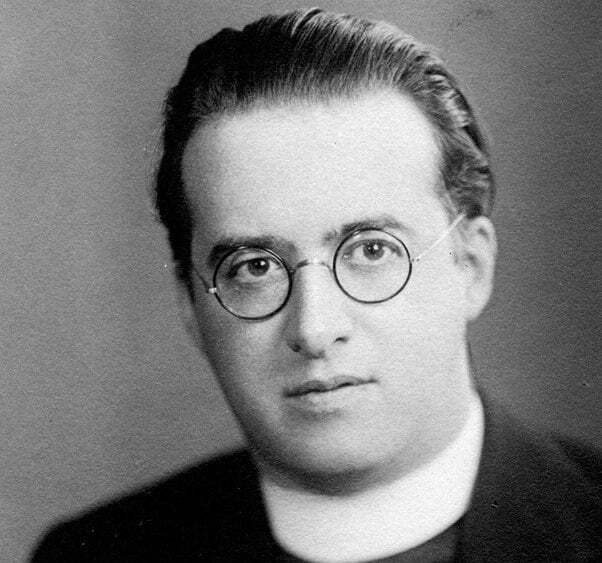
The Reverend Monsignor Georges Lemaître (1894-1966)

Catholic clergy have been credited as fathers of a diverse range of scientific fields: Bl. Nicolas Steno (1638-1686) was a founder of geology, Fr. Angelo Secchi (1818-1878) helped launch astrophysics, Fr. Gregor Mendel (1822-1884) pioneered genetics, and Msgr. Georges Lemaître (1894-1966) proposed the Big Bang cosmological model. Church patronage of the sciences continues through institutions like the Pontifical Academy of Sciences and Vatican Observatory.

== Faith and reason ==
=== Belief seeking understanding ===
The early Church's interest in astronomy stemmed from issues surrounding the determination of the date for Easter, which was originally tied to the Hebrew lunisolar calendar. In the 4th century, due to perceived problems with the Hebrew calendar's leap month system, the Council of Nicaea prescribed that Easter would fall on the first Sunday following the first full moon after the vernal equinox.

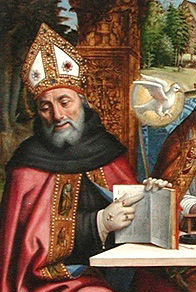
St. Augustine, by Pier Francesco Sacchi, 1516

To a significant extent, the Church's approach to the study of the natural world was part of the intellectual legacy of St. Augustine of Hippo (354–430). In his "Two Books" doctrine, Augustine maintained that God revealed truth through both the Book of Scripture and the Book of Nature:

It is the divine page that you must listen to; it is the book of the universe that you must observe. The pages of Scripture can only be read by those who know how to read and write, while everyone, even the illiterate, can read the book of the universe.

Some people, in order to discover God, read a book. But there is a great book: the very appearance of created things. Look above and below, note, read. God whom you want to discover, did not make the letters with ink; he put in front of your eyes the very things that he made. Can you ask for a louder voice than that?

In De Genesi ad litteram Augustine identified a space for the study of nature by Christians:

In matters that are obscure and far beyond our vision, even in such as we may find treated in Holy Scripture, different Interpretations are sometimes possible without prejudice to the faith we have received. In such a case, we should not rush in headlong and so firmly take our stand on one side that, if further progress in the search of truth justly undermines this position, we too fall with it...Usually, even a non-Christian knows something about the earth, the heavens, and the other elements of this world, about the motion and orbit of the stars [...] and so forth, and this knowledge he holds to as being certain from reason and experience. Now, it is a disgraceful and dangerous thing for an infidel to hear a Christian, presumably giving the meaning of Holy Scripture, talking non-sense on these topics; and we should take all means to prevent such an embarrassing situation, in which people show up vast ignorance in a Christian and laugh it to scorn. The shame is not so much that an ignorant individual is derided, but that people outside the household of the faith think our sacred writers held such opinions, and, to the great loss of those for whose salvation we toil...

By acknowledging that there is "obscure" knowledge to be discovered about the world "even in such as we may find treated in Holy Scripture" and also framing the study of astronomy, specifically, as a way to prevent infidels from scorning Christians in a way that could interfere with their salvation, Augustine helped to keep the study of the heavens a religiously-respectable activity during the Middle Ages when the cultural influence of the Church was at its zenith.

=== Sanctuary of letters ===
Because papyrus perishes easily and does not last well in the wetter European climate, any existing papyrus books that people wanted to preserve were eventually moved from papyrus to parchment. After the Arab conquest of Egypt in 642, the import of papyrus to Europe appears to have ceased altogether. Since parchment was far more expensive than papyrus, books became accessible only to the Church and the very wealthy. The leading scholars of the Early Middle Ages were all clergymen, for whom the study of nature was but a small part of their scholarly interest but who had both opportunity and motive for the study of aspects of nature. Modern readers may find it disconcerting that sometimes the same works discuss both the technical details of natural phenomena and their symbolic significance but this mixing reflects the core conviction of the era's clergy scholars that reason should serve religious belief, sometimes also referred to as the idea that natural philosophy should be the "handmaiden" to theology.

On the fringes of western Europe, where the Roman tradition had not made a strong imprint, monks engaged in the study of Latin as a foreign language, and actively investigated the traditions of Roman learning. Ireland's most learned monks even retained knowledge of Greek. Irish missionaries like Colombanus (543-615) later founded monasteries in continental Europe, which went on to create libraries and become centers of scholarship. The need for monks to determine the proper time to pray led them to study the motion of the stars; the need to compute the date of Easter led them to study and teach rudimentary mathematics and the motions of the Sun and Moon.

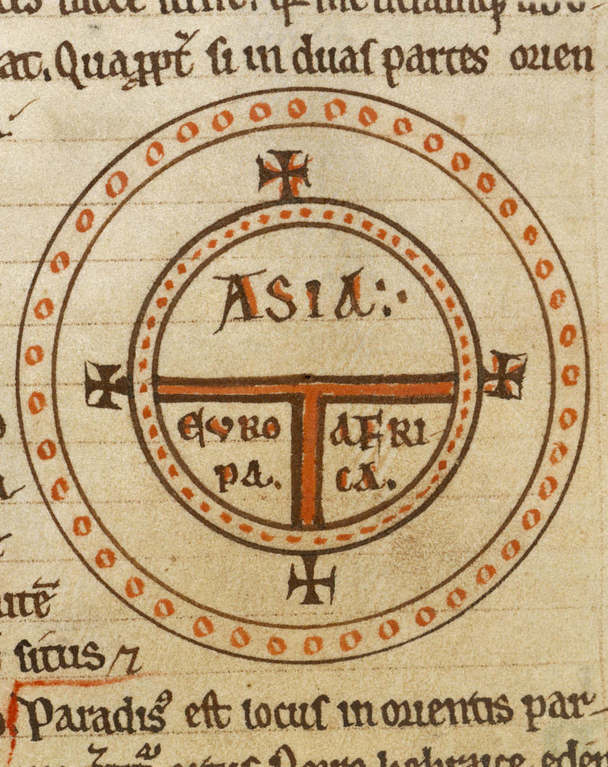
This "T and O map", from a 12th century copy of Isidore's Etymologiae, identifies the world's continents (Asia, Europe and Africa).

The period between the 4th and the 8th centuries was the era of the "Latin Encyclopedists". The most popular and notable of their works was Etymologiae, a vast compendium of human knowledge at the time, including mathematics, geometry, astronomy, medicine, animals, the physical world, geography, metals and rocks compiled by Bishop Isidore of Seville (c. 560-636). In On the Reckoning of Time, the monk Bede of Jarrow (c. 673-735) provided churchmen with the practical astronomical knowledge needed to compute the proper date of Easter using a procedure called the computus. (This text remained an important element of the education of clergy from the 8th century until well after the rise of the universities in the 12th century.) Bede described two comets over England in AD 729 as "fiery torches" that struck terror in all who saw them – for comets were heralds of bad news. Rabanus Maurus (c. 780-856), Archbishop of Mainz was one of the most prominent teachers of the Carolingian Age who, like Bede, wrote treatises on computus and On the Nature of Things. Abbot Ælfric of Eynsham (c. 955–c. 1010), who is known mostly for his Old English homilies, wrote a book on astronomical time reckoning in Old English based on the writings of Bede. Abbo of Fleury (c. 945-1004), the abbot of Fleury Abbey, wrote astronomical discussions of timekeeping and of the celestial spheres for his students, teaching for a while in England where he influenced the work of Byrhtferth of Ramsey (c. 970-c. 1020), who wrote a Manual in Old English to discuss timekeeping and the natural and mystical significance of numbers.

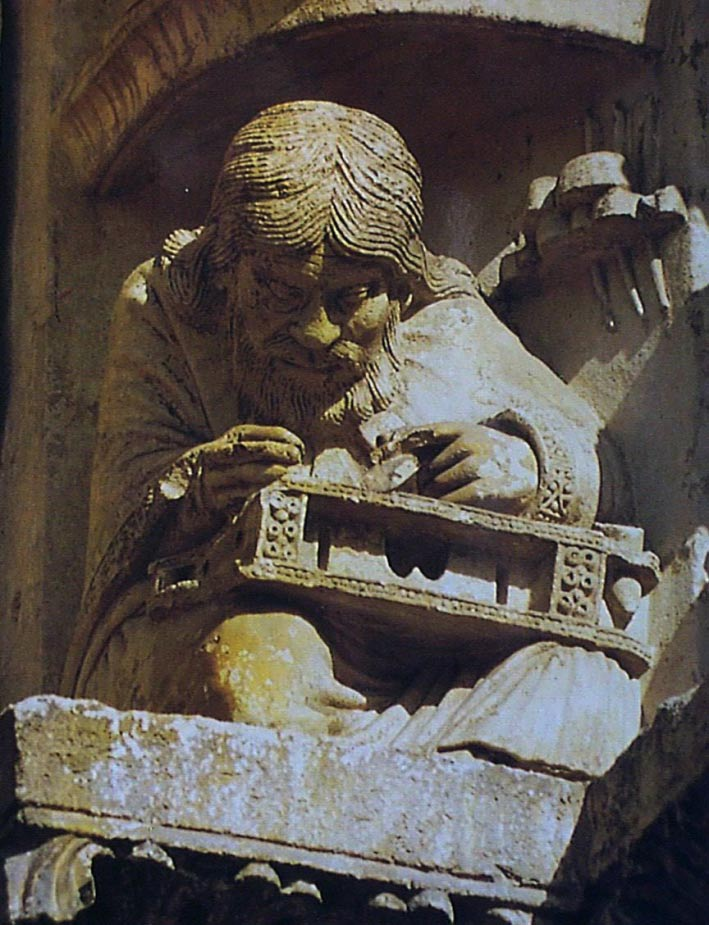
Pythagoras on one of the archivolts at Chartres Cathedral. From Medieval Europe's Cathedral Schools grew many of Europe's modern universities.

=== Foundation of universities ===
In the High Middle Ages, Cathedral schools developed as centers of education. The School of Chartres, established by the Chartres Cathedral, became an important center of French scholarship. One of the most prominent members of the School, William of Conches (c. 1090-c. 1154), wrote that "in those matters that pertain to the Catholic faith or moral instruction, it is not allowed to contradict Bede or any other holy fathers. If, however, they err in those matters that pertain to physics, it is permitted to state an opposite view."

Cathedral schools evolved into, or were superseded by, medieval universities which were the springboard of many of Western Europe's later scientific achievements. The oldest university currently in continuous operation in the world appeared in the 11th century in Italy (the University of Bologna). Paris University (c. 1150), Oxford University (1167), Salerno University (1173), the University of Vicenza (1204), Cambridge University (1209), Salamanca University (1218–1219), Padua University (1222), Naples University (1224), and Vercelli University (1228) followed over the next century and a half. Closely associated with the Church, these medieval universities used church Latin as a lingua franca.

In the 12th century, the Church helped re-popularize and disseminate ancient Greek ideas and mathematical techniques across Europe by sponsoring the translation of newly available Arabic-language versions of Greek texts into Latin. This was done in large part to aid in astronomical study. J.L. Heilbron in his book The Sun in the Church: Cathedrals as Solar Observatories writes that "the Roman Catholic Church gave more financial aid and support to the study of astronomy for over six centuries, from the recovery of ancient learning during the late Middle Ages into the Enlightenment, than any other, and, probably, all other, institutions."

=== Scholasticism ===
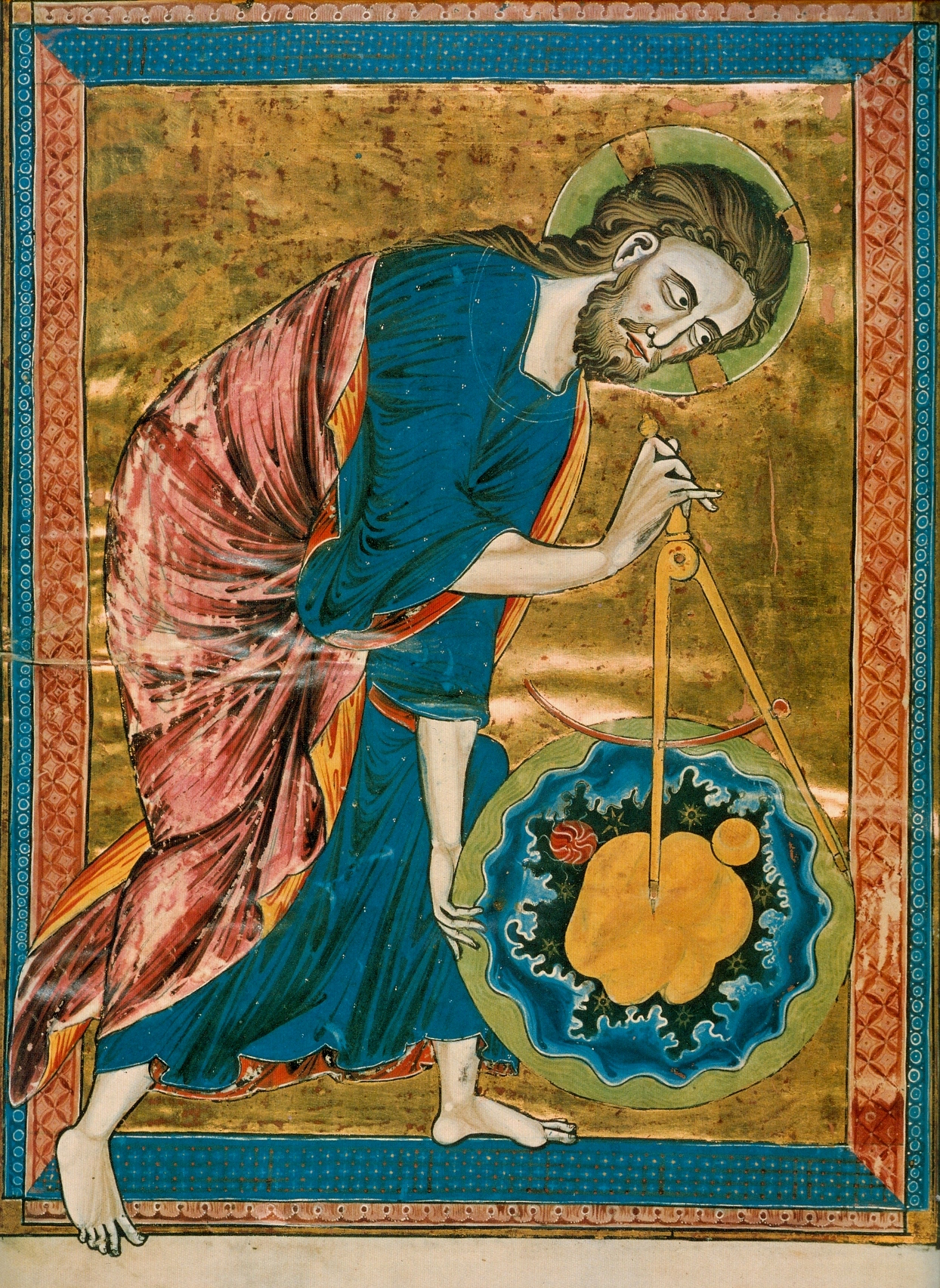
God as Architect/Geometer, from the frontispiece of French Codex Vindobonensis 2554, c. 1250

Theology was regarded as the first among the faculties and the "queen of the sciences" but within this religious framework medieval universities produced a great variety of scholars and natural philosophers - later known collectively as the "scholastics" - including Robert Grosseteste (1170-1253), who taught at the University of Oxford, was the founder of the Oxford Franciscan school, became the Bishop of Lincoln, and was an early expositor of a systematic method of scientific experimentation; Saint Albert the Great (1200-1280), who wrote in De Mineralibus (Book II, Tractate ii, Ch. 1) that "it is [the task] of natural science not simply to accept what we are told but to inquire into the causes of natural things"; and Roger Bacon (c. 1214–1292), who wrote in Opus Majus that "there are two modes of acquiring knowledge, namely, by reasoning and by experience. Reasoning draws a conclusion, but does not make the conclusion certain, nor does it remove doubt so that the mind may rest in the intuition of truth, unless the mind discovers it by the path of experience."

Before studying in the higher faculties of law, medicine or theology, medieval universities required that students earn a "Master of Arts" degree. The science historian Edward Grant notes that, starting in the mid-13th century, the curriculum for the degree consisted of courses in logic, physics, cosmology, astronomy and mathematics. "Higher education in the Middle Ages," Grant writes, "was essentially a program in logic and science. Never before, and not since, have logic and science formed the basis of higher education for all arts students."

In Science and the Modern World, Alfred North Whitehead argued that modern science inherited a "faith" in the power of human reason from medieval scholastics. Grant makes a similar argument:

Over some four centuries, medieval natural philosophers transmitted a legacy to their non-Aristotelian, and largely anti-Aristotelian, successors in the early modern period, a legacy that was unacknowledged. That legacy was a pervasive and deep-seated spirit of inquiry that was a natural consequence of the widespread and intensive emphasis on reason that began in the Middle Ages. With the exception of revealed truths, reason was the ultimate arbiter for most intellectual arguments and controversies in medieval universities.

By 1500, prior to the Reformation, Catholic Europe had approximately 64 universities. Copernicus, Brahe, Galileo, Kepler, and Newton all studied at universities founded during the Middle Ages.

=== Copernicus ===
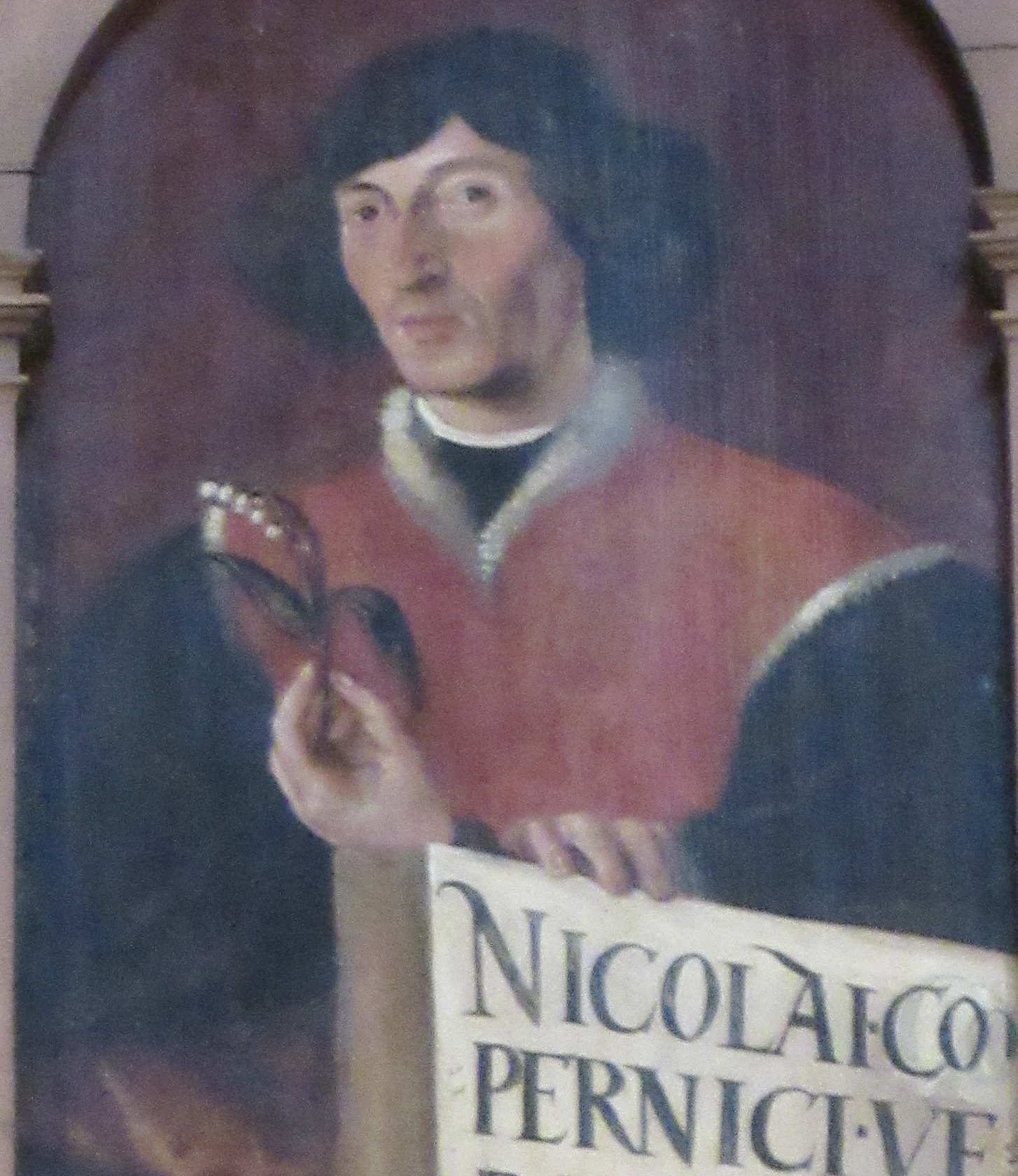
Portrait of Nikolas Copernicus on the Strasbourg astronomical clock, made by Tobias Stimmer c. 1571–74.

Nicolaus Copernicus (Note: /koʊˈpɜːrnɪkəs, kəˈ-/ koh-PUR-nik-əs, kə-; Polish: Mikołaj Kopernik [miˈkɔwaj kɔˈpɛrɲik]; Middle Low German: Niklas Koppernigk; German: Nikolaus Kopernikus.) (19 February 1473 – 24 May 1543) was a Renaissance polymath and Catholic canon who formulated a model of the universe that placed the Sun rather than Earth at its center. As a young man he studied, for over a decade, at three different Catholic universities (the University of Kraków (1491–1495), the University of Bologna (1496–1500) and the University of Padua (1501–1503)).

In 1533 - when Copernicus was sixty - Johann Albrecht Widmannstetter delivered a series of lectures in Rome outlining Copernicus' theory. Pope Clement VII and several Catholic cardinals heard the lectures and were interested in the theory. On 1 November 1536, Nikolaus von Schönberg, Archbishop of Capua and since the previous year a cardinal, wrote to Copernicus from Rome:

Some years ago word reached me concerning your proficiency, of which everybody constantly spoke. At that time I began to have a very high regard for you. ...For I had learned that you had not merely mastered the discoveries of the ancient astronomers uncommonly well but had also formulated a new cosmology. In it you maintain that the earth moves; that the sun occupies the lowest, and thus the central, place in the universe. ...Therefore with the utmost earnestness I entreat you, most learned sir, unless I inconvenience you, to communicate this discovery of yours to scholars, and at the earliest possible moment to send me your writings on the sphere of the universe together with the tables and whatever else you have that is relevant to this subject.

Despite urgings from many quarters, Copernicus delayed publication of his book, De revolutionibus orbium coelestium. Scholars disagree on whether Copernicus' publication delay was limited to concern about possible astronomical and philosophical objections or whether he was also concerned about religious objections. (Note: Koyré and Rosen take the view that Copernicus was indeed concerned about possible objections from theologians, while Lindberg and Numbers argue against it. Koestler also denies it. Indirect evidence that Copernicus was concerned about objections from theologians comes from a letter written to him by Andreas Osiander in 1541, in which Osiander advises Copernicus to adopt a proposal by which he says "you will be able to appease the Peripatetics and theologians whose opposition you fear". Perhaps as an attempt to preempt criticism, Copernicus dedicated De revolutionibus to Pope Paul III.)

The majority of sixteenth-century astronomers who read De revolutionibus thought that eliminating the equant was Copernicus' big achievement, because it satisfied the ancient aesthetic principle that eternal celestial motions should be uniform and circular or compounded of uniform and circular parts. In the sixty years following his death in 1543, Copernicus’s proposal that the earth was a planet was primarily attacked by Protestant leaders like Martin Luther and Philip Melanchthon, who used literalist interpretations of Scripture to denounce the idea as "absurd" and urged secular governments to repress it. In contrast, De revolutionibus initially caused only mild controversy among Catholics. The Catholic establishment - which Copernicus was himself a part of for nearly a half century as a canon - did not shun De revolutionibus. The Church itself remained officially silent on the theory’s merits and even utilized some Copernican mathematics for the 1582 Gregorian calendar reform. While a Dominican named Giovanni Maria Tolosani did denounce the theory as a contradiction of Holy Scripture in 1546, his critique remained an isolated incident rather than an official stance of the Church before 1610.

=== Jesuits ===
Founded in 1540 at the end of the Renaissance and the beginning of the Counter-Reformation to meet the threat of Protestantism, the Society of Jesus (the Jesuits) acquired a durable reputation as teachers and scholars. Beginning in the late 16th century, the Jesuits - led by Father Matteo Ricci, Father Johann Adam Schall von Bell and Father Ferdinand Verbiest - also sent missionaries to China where they were welcomed for their expert knowledge of astronomy, calendar-making, mathematics, hydraulics, and geography.

=== Gregorian calendar ===
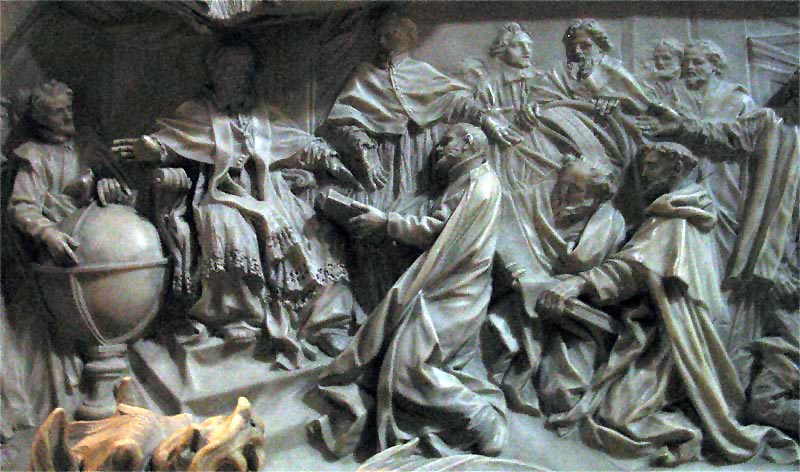
Detail of the tomb of Pope Gregory XIII (sculptor: Camillo Rusconi) celebrating the introduction of the Gregorian calendar

By the 16th century, the date of the vernal equinox on the Julian calendar had receded from March 25 to March 11. The Council of Trent authorized the pope to deal with calendar reform in order to stop the slow process in which the Church's holidays were drifting relative to the seasons. Using the Prussian Tables of Erasmus Reinhold and building on the work of Aloysius Lilius, Christopher Clavius - a Jesuit astronomer and head of mathematicians at the Collegio Romano - proposed a significant reform. The resulting Gregorian calendar is the internationally accepted civil calendar used throughout the world today. (Note: The international standard for the representation of dates and times ISO 8601 uses the Gregorian calendar.) It was introduced by Pope Gregory XIII, after whom the calendar was named, by a decree signed on 24 February 1582.

=== Christianity and modern science ===
"When natural philosophers referred to laws of nature, they were not glibly choosing that metaphor. Laws were the result of legislation by an intelligent deity."

— John Hedley Brooke, Science and Religion: Some Historical Perspectives (1991)

Scholars have noted a direct tie between "particular aspects of traditional Christianity" and the emergence of modern science. For example, historian Peter Harrison argues that Christianity contributed to the Scientific Revolution because many of its key figures had deeply held religious convictions and believed "themselves to be champions of a science that was more compatible with Christianity than the medieval ideas about the natural world that they replaced." In The Origins of Modern Science, Herbert Butterfield observed that "the Christians helped the cause of modern rationalism by their jealous determination to sweep out of the world all miracles and magic except their own."

"Galileo and Kepler said that even though no person is perfect, the "book of nature" was written not by man but by God, and God is perfect. Therefore nature must be perfect, and if we find the smallest mistake in our theories, we should make a great effort to correct it, to improve our theories so that they fit the facts perfectly."

— Joseph Agassi, The Continuing Revolution: A History of Physics From The Greeks to Einstein (1968)

According to science historian John Hedley Brooke, the medieval "search for signs of God in nature had often been based on the assumption that the two books [of Scripture and Nature] had been written in essentially the same language." Kepler and Galileo, however, both believed that because the Book of Nature was created by God, it must therefore be absolutely perfect but that its hidden perfection could only be understood with mathematics:

Philosophy [i.e. natural philosophy] is written in this grand book - I mean the Universe - which stands continually open to our gaze, but it cannot be understood unless one first learns to comprehend the language and interpret the characters in which it is written. It is written in the language of mathematics...without which it is humanly impossible to understand a single word of it...

While St. Augustine had written, more than a millennium earlier, that “everyone, even the illiterate, can read the book of the universe,” Galileo asserted that numeracy, not just literacy, was required to read the Book of Nature so that even fewer people were able to truly "read" it than the literate able to read the Book of Scripture. Galileo also argued that not only should certainties of science never be "called in question (much less condemned) upon the testimony of biblical passages which may have some different meaning beneath their words" but also that those same scientific certainties should be used, where appropriate, to help interpret Scripture.

== Faith versus reason ==
=== Condemnations of the 13th century ===
The Church played a pivotal role in both establishing the University of Paris around 1150 and then facilitating the acquisition and translation of lost Greek texts, including physical treatises of Aristotle, into Latin but within just a few decades (1210) a provincial synod declared that "[n]either the books of Aristotle on natural philosophy or their commentaries are to be read at Paris in public or secret, and this we forbid under penalty of excommunication." In 1215, acting under the authority of Pope Innocent III, papal legate Robert of Courçon incorporated these restrictions into the University's governing documents, effectively curtailing the teaching of certain Aristotelian texts and marking the opening phase of the "Condemnations". Two additional rounds of "Condemnations" were undertaken in 1270 and 1277. Approximately sixteen lists of censured theses were issued by the University of Paris during the 13th and 14th centuries. Most of these lists of propositions were put together into systematic collections of prohibited articles.

Some scholars have argued that the 13th-century Condemnations were beneficial for medieval natural philosophy because they loosened the hold of Aristotelian dogma on natural philosophers in the following century. By condemning any proposition of natural philosophy that subordinated divine omnipotence - "God's absolute power" - to Aristotelian impossibilities, the Condemnations inadvertently freed scholars to explore "what-if" scenarios that Aristotle had declared impossible, such as the existence of a vacuum, the plurality of worlds, or the rotation of the Earth. This encouraged a shift in natural philosophy from an Aristotelian-style search for logical necessity toward the possibility of contingency (e.g. the idea that the actual order of Nature is one of many God could have chosen). The Condemnations - expressions of religious authority - may have helped to open a door for natural philosophers to move beyond pure logical deduction towards a later project of "reading" the Book of Nature as God, in fact, wrote it.

=== Roman Inquisition ===
Following the emergence of the Protestant churches and nations of Northern Europe, the Catholic Church struggled to defend its authority in Europe. The mathematician and philosopher Jacob Bronowski wrote that "Catholics and Protestants were embattled in what we should now call a Cold War. The Church was a great temporal power, and in that bitter time it was fighting a political crusade in which all means were justified by the end." In 1542, Pope Paul III established the Congregation of the Roman Inquisition (known later as the Holy Office) to stop the spread of "heretical depravity" throughout the Christian world. The Inquisition was empowered by the Church to use aggressive tactics, including house arrest and even torture, to stop heresy and enforce religious conformity. From 1571, the Inquisition had jurisdiction over books and created the Index of Forbidden Books.

The Inquisition's system of tribunals lasted until the mid 18th century, when pre-unification Italian states began to suppress the local inquisitions, effectively eliminating the power of the church to prosecute heretical crimes but the Inquisition continued to exist into the 19th century. The Index was active from 1560 to 1966. While active, it banned thousands of books.

=== Conrad Gessner ===
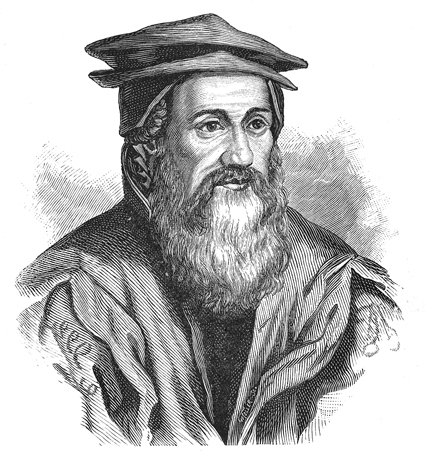
Conrad Gessner (1516–1565). His Historiae animalium is considered the beginning of modern zoology.

Conrad Gessner's zoological work, Historiae animalium, which appeared in four volumes and was published between 1551 and 1588. Under Pope Paul IV, it was added to the Church's list of prohibited books as Gessner was a Protestant. He still maintained friendship with Catholics regardless of the religious animosities between Catholics and Protestants at that time. Gaining support for his work, Catholic booksellers in Venice protested the ban on Gessner's books but it was later on allowed for selling once it was revised and "freed" from doctrines contrary to the Catholic faith.

=== Galileo Galilei: The ban of 1616 ===
"...in discussions of physical problems we ought to begin not from the authority of scriptural passages, but from sense-experiences and necessary demonstrations; for the holy Bible and the phenomena of nature proceed alike from the divine Word, the former as the dictate of the Holy Ghost and the latter as the observant executrix of God's commands. It is necessary for the Bible, in order to be accommodated to the understanding of every man, to speak many things which appear to differ from the absolute truth so far as the bare meaning of the words is concerned. But Nature, on the other hand, is inexorable and immutable; she never transgresses the laws imposed upon her, or cares a whit whether her abstruse reasons and methods of operation are understandable to men. For that reason it appears that nothing physical which sense-experience sets before our eyes, or which necessary demonstrations prove to us, ought to be called in question (much less condemned) upon the testimony of biblical passages which may have some different meaning beneath their words. For the Bible is not chained in every expression to conditions as strict as those which govern all physical effects; nor is God any less excellently revealed in Nature's actions than in the sacred statements of the Bible. Perhaps this is what Tertullian meant by these words: 'We conclude that God is known first through Nature, and then again, more particularly, by doctrine; by Nature in His works, and by doctrine in His revealed word.'"

— Galileo Galilei, Letter to the Grand Duchess Christina (1615)

Galileo Galilei was a Catholic scientist during the Scientific Revolution. Initially a beneficiary of Church patronage of astronomy, Galileo rose to prominence with the publication of Starry Messenger in 1610, which included astronomical observations made possible by the 1608 invention of the telescope. He was feted in Rome, honoured by the Jesuits of the Roman College, and received by Pope Paul V and Church dignitaries. In 1613, his Letters on Sunspots was published, which reported his 1610 telescopic observations of the full set of phases of Venus, strong evidence that geocentrism was false. A "publicist and a partisan" in addition to being a scholar, Galileo argued in the Letter to the Grand Duchess Christina (1615) that the language of the Bible had been accommodated to be understandable to uneducated people and should therefore not be interpreted as literal scientific descriptions and the Church risked reputational damage in the long run if it officially condemned heliocentrism. He invited the Church to follow established practice and reinterpret Scripture in light of the new scientific discoveries, quoting Cardinal Baronius that "the intention of the Holy Ghost is to teach us how one goes to heaven, not how heaven goes.” (Note: "Spiritui Sancto mentem fuisse nos docere quomodo ad coelum eatu r, non quomodo coelum gradiatur.") The leading Jesuit theologian, Cardinal Robert Bellarmine, agreed this would be an appropriate response to a true demonstration that the Sun was at the center of the universe ("heliocentrism"), but cautioned that the existing materials upon which Galileo relied did not yet constitute an established truth. Cardinal Carlo Conti privately told Galileo that Scripture could potentially accommodate a moving Earth but also cautioned Galileo against publicly adopting such views "without great necessity."

Galileo received staunch support from a Carmelite friar, Paolo Antonio Foscarini, who published a book defending Galileo's heliocentrism and presenting it as compatible with the Bible, but also bitter opposition from some philosophers and clerics, two of whom denounced him to the Roman Inquisition early in 1615, warning "that Galileo should not go outside mathematics and physics and should avoid provoking theologians by teaching them how to read the Bible". One of the philosophers who issued a complaint to the inquisition was Tommaso Caccini, who disregarded Galileo as a "mathematician" and strongly attacked him in his sermons, ordering him to withdraw from philosophy and citing Acts 1:11 "Ye men of Galilee, why stand ye gazing up into heaven?".

The report of the Inquisition's consultants declared heliocentrism as "false and contrary to Scripture" in February 1616, although Maurice Finocchiaro notes that Copernicanism was never formally declared to be heresy as the Congregation of the Holy Office did not endorse the consultant's report and refused to follow through with an official declaration. On 26 February, Cardinal Bellarmine visited Galileo and informed him of the inquisition's decision, explaining that although Copernicanism could be a viable theory, it was not proven true. As such, the church could not abandon the common interpretation of scripture for a hypothesis. Bellarmine argued that should a decisive proof of Earth's motion be found, the church would "admit that we do not understand them rather than say that something that has been proved is false." He then demanded Galileo to stop teaching and defending Copernican theory, to which Galileo agreed. Bellarmine met with the Pope on 3 March, and informed him of Galileo's compliance. That month, the Church's Congregation of the Index issued a decree suspending De revolutionibus because the idea that the Earth moves and the Sun does not was "false and altogether opposed to Holy Scripture." The edits to De revolutionibus, which omitted or altered nine sentences, were issued four years later, in 1620.

=== Galileo Galilei: The trial of 1633 ===
In 1623, Galileo's friend Maffeo Barberini was elected as Pope Urban VIII. Urban VIII was an intellectual and patron of the arts and architecture, who had written poetry as a young man in praise of Galileo's astronomical writings. Galileo met with the new Pope, hoping to persuade him to lift the 1616 ban. Urban VIII had been an ally of Galileo ever since he became a cardinal, and provided funding for Galileo's work. The Pope's correspondence also reveals that he was privately sympathetic to Copernacnism, but did not wish to publicly admit so. On the condition that it remain an objective analysis of competing cosmologies, the Pope permitted Galileo to publish a book on the Copernican hypothesis. However, the resulting Dialogue Concerning the Two Chief World Systems explicitly endorsed the Copernican model. Because the book appeared with the Pope's endorsement on its title page, it appeared that the Church officially supported heliocentrism, compromising Urban VIII’s position as well as personally offending him as his own arguments were put into the mouth of the buffoon-like "Simplicio" in the dialogue.

According to Finocchiaro, although Urban VIII himself sympathised with Galileo and wanted him to merely revise the "Dialogue", Galileo's attacks on influential clerical figures and massive backlash forced him to act. The position of the Pope was also greatly endangered by the ongoing Thirty Years' War, which pressured him to reaffirm his authority. William René Shea argues that Galileo attracted the interest of the Inquisition by getting involved in theological matters. Galileo insisted that heliocentrism was of "undoubted certainty" and said the Scriptural interpretations that seemed to suggest otherwise should be re-evaluated.

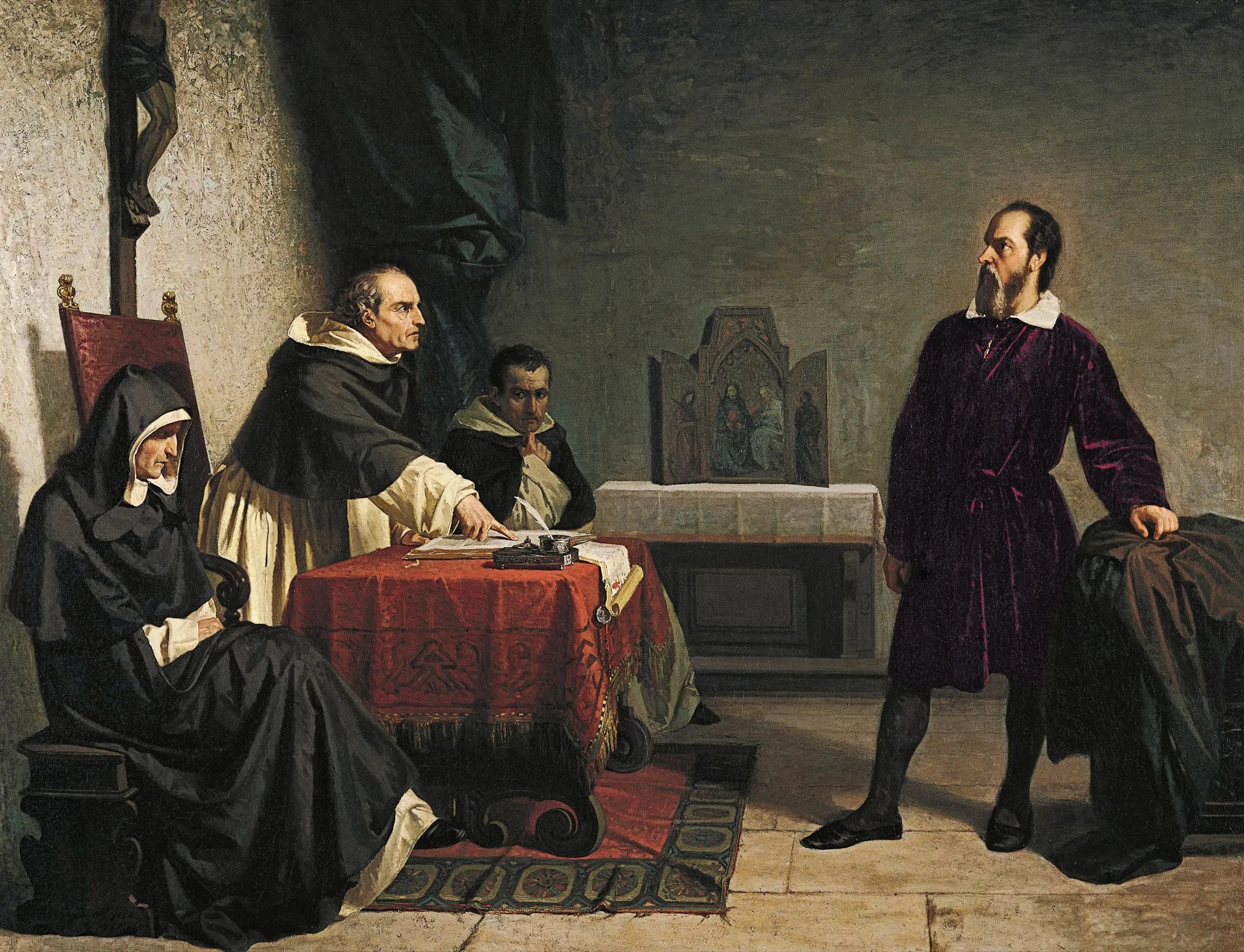
Cristiano Banti's 1857 painting Galileo facing the Roman Inquisition

Galileo was summoned to Rome to be tried by the Inquisition in 1633. He was accused of violating the 1616 ban that forbade him from teaching or defending his theory and breaking his agreement with the Pope, as instead of following through the compromise of Urban VIII to present his theory as a hypothesis and an "instrument of prediction and calculation", Galileo presented his beliefs as "factual and unconditional". Dialogue received backlash for its "rhetorical excesses and biting sarcasm", including attacking several clerical figures. Finocchiaro notes that the trial was focused on philosophy, and Galileo claimed to "have spent more years studying philosophy than months studying pure mathematics". Galileo was supported by several Catholic figures such as Monsignor Piero Dini, Carmelite Paolo Antonio Foscarini, and a Dominican Tommaso Campanella; his trial in 1633 made him gain sympathy from more clergy like Ascanio II Piccolomini and Fulgenzio Micanzio.

Galileo was found "vehemently suspect of heresy" for "following the position of Copernicus, which is contrary to the true sense and authority of Holy Scripture." Galileo was forced to recant, and was sentenced to house arrest, with the sentence being commuted on 23 June 1633. While under house arrest, Galileo wrote his most influential work, Two New Sciences. Despite discussing the motion of Earth and endorsing Copernican theory, Galileo did not suffer any harm from the Inquisition for publishing this book, even though it reached Rome's bookstores in January 1639, and all available copies were quickly sold. Finocchario argues that since the Inquisition allowed Galileo's Two New Sciences to later be published - despite endorsing the Copernican theory - Galileo's trial was not a condemnation of heliocentrism but rather a condemnation of Galileo's attempt to reinterpret the Bible, which was seen as especially dangerous amid the Counter-Reformation.

== After the Revolution ==
The Scientific Revolution of the 17th century was a fundamental restructuring of human civilization that included a decoupling of knowledge production from either religious sponsorship or authority. Historians of science continue to debate the magnitude of this shift: Did the Revolution merely "outshine... everything since the rise of Christianity" or is the better comparison actually to the Neolithic Revolution?

=== Profane universe ===
Galileo’s early 17th-century telescopic observations began the transformation of what had been a narrowly technical revision of classical astronomy by Copernicus - the pious Church official - into an increasingly disorienting challenge to traditional cosmology. This shift began by reimagining the Earth as an unremarkable planet in motion; it would eventually culminate in a vision of a world circulating purposelessly around an ordinary star, no different from an uncountable number of others. This transformation posed a threat not only to the long-standing synthesis of Aristotelian physics and Christian theology (Note: In Aristotle's cosmology, Earth was the realm of imperfection, inconstancy, irregularity, and change while the heavens (Moon, Sun, planets, stars) were perfect, permanent, unchangeable and, in religious thought, the realm of heavenly beings.) but also to a view of the universe whose spiritual significance had once been transparent to the faithful. In its place, modern astronomy offered a view of the universe in which the "celestial" realm had vanished and the physical location of human beings appeared to lack any religious meaning or significance.

The end of the human-centered cosmos was eventually part of a complete replacement of a finite and qualitative world by an infinite and quantitative one. That replacement appeared to leave human beings alone in a silent, infinite universe where existence was no longer a reflection of divine values but merely a neutral fact of mathematics. The science historian Alexandre Koyré memorably described this unintended outcome of the Scientific Revolution - the stripping of hierarchical order, purpose and meaning from the universe — as the "utter devalorization of being." In his Pensees published in 1670 after his death (but which the author had intended to be titled Apologie de la religion Chrétienne ("Defence of the Christian Religion") before he died), the mathematician, philosopher and Catholic writer Blaise Pascal wrote that the "eternal silence of these infinite spaces frightens me."

=== Understanding without belief ===
The upheaval of the Scientific Revolution extended beyond a specific problem of cosmology to a broader epistemological challenge that decisively overthrew the medieval view of natural philosophy as the servant (or "handmaiden") of theology. Galileo, Kepler and others argued that the Book of Nature was separate from the Book of Scripture and that only the latter was designed to tell humans "how to go to heaven." Francis Bacon went even farther to warn his 17th-century contemporaries against the "corruption of philosophy by superstition and an admixture of theology" and the "unwholesome mixture of things human and divine" which was liable to produce not only "fantastic philosophy" but also "heretical religion" too. Bacon urged natural philosophers to "give to faith that only which is faith's." While the era’s "scientists" were almost always highly devout as individuals, their day-to-day practices as scientists increasingly followed a mechanistic logic that left no room for any mixing of the measurable with the miraculous.

As natural philosophy continued to grow in power, self-confidence and independence during the 17th century, the intellectual attitude of educated people shifted from fides quaerens intellectum toward a mode of understanding increasingly detached from religion:

...let us take for a moment a typical well-educated European in 1600...He believes in witchcraft...He believes Circe really did turn Odysseus's crew into pigs. He believes mice are spontaneously generated in piles of straw...He believes that nature abhors a vacuum. He believes the rainbow is a sign from God and that comets portend evil...He believes, of course, that the earth stands still and the sun and stars turn around the earth once every twenty-four hours...But now let us jump far ahead [to 1733]...He does not know anyone (or at least not anyone educated and reasonably sophisticated) who believes in witches, magic, alchemy or astrology; he thinks the Odyssey is fiction, not fact....He knows that the rainbow is produced by refracted light and that comets have no significance for our lives on earth. He believes that the future cannot be predicted. He knows that the heart is a pump...He believes that science is going to transform the world and that the moderns have outstripped the ancients in every possible respect. He has trouble believing in miracles, even the ones in the Bible...Between 1600 and 1733...the intellectual world of the educated elite changed more rapidly than at any time in previous history...The only name we have for this great transformation is 'the Scientific Revolution'.

=== Observational astronomy ===
Between 1650 and 1750, four observatories run by the Catholic Church were among the best solar observatories in the world. Built largely to fix an unquestionable date for Easter, they also housed instruments that threw light on the disputed geometry of the Solar System.

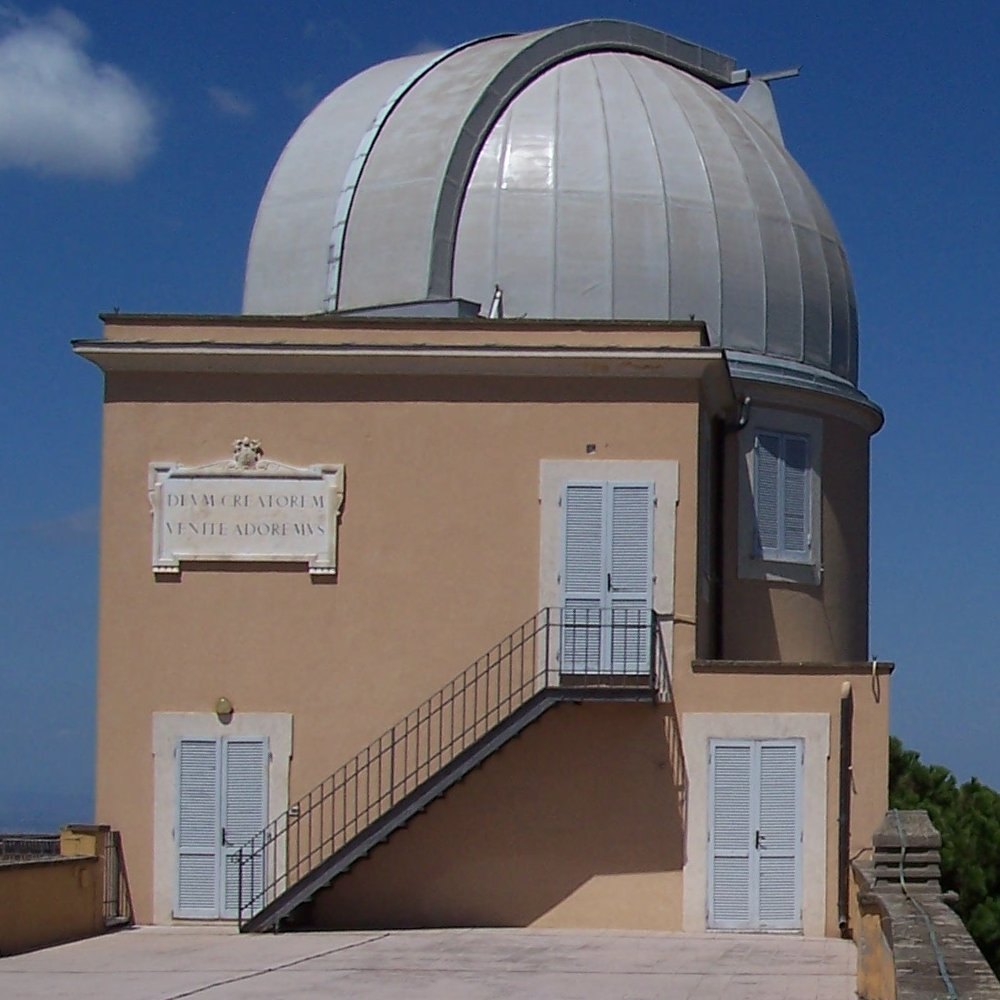
Vatican Observatory

In 1789, the Vatican Observatory (Specola Vaticana) - an astronomical research and educational institution supported by the Holy See - opened. It was moved to Castel Gandolfo, the summer residence of the Pope, in the 1930s. The Vatican Advanced Technology Telescope at the Mount Graham International Observatory began operation in Arizona, USA, in 1995.

Many distinguished scholars have worked at the Observatory. In 2008, the Templeton Prize was awarded to cosmologist Fr. Michał Heller, a Vatican Observatory Adjunct Scholar. In 2010, the George Van Biesbroeck Prize was awarded to former observatory director Fr. George Coyne, SJ. In 2014, the Director of the Observatory, Brother Guy Consolmagno, SJ, was awarded the American Astronomical Society's Carl Sagan Medal for Excellence in Public Communication in Planetary Science.

Perhaps one of the greatest contributions made by the Jesuits to science is the large network of observatories they founded across the world. Jesuits devised modern lunar nomenclature and stellar classification and some 35 craters of the moon are named after Jesuits. Historian Jonathan Wright writes that Jesuits "observed, in some cases before anyone else, the colored bands on Jupiter's surface, the Andromeda nebula, and Saturn's rings." Between 1824 and 1957, 75 observatories were founded by the Jesuits. In some countries in Asia and Africa, these observatories were the first scientific institutions they had ever had.

=== Conflict, independence, dialogue or integration ===
In the 19th century, the scientist-historian John William Draper and diplomat, politician and historian Andrew Dickson White were the most influential exponents of the conflict thesis between the Catholic Church and science. In the early 1870s, Draper was invited to write a History of the Conflict between Religion and Science (1874), a book replying to contemporary papal edicts such as the doctrine of infallibility, and mostly criticizing the anti-intellectualism of Roman Catholicism, yet he assessed that Islam and Protestantism had little conflict with science. Draper's preface summarises the conflict thesis: "The history of Science is not a mere record of isolated discoveries; it is a narrative of the conflict of two contending powers, the expansive force of the human intellect on one side, and the compression arising from traditionary faith and human interests on the other." In 1896, White published A History of the Warfare of Science with Theology in Christendom, the culmination of thirty years of research and publication on the subject. In the introduction, White emphasized he arrived at his position after the difficulties of assisting Ezra Cornell in establishing a university without any official religious affiliation.

The conflict thesis has little support among contemporary science historians. Later uses of the term may instead refer to more subtle and/or episodic conflicts, including disagreements over the demarcations between science and religion, struggles for influence over government policy, confrontations over new technologies or clashes over particular scientific discoveries that appear to challenge the authority and power of religious institutions. The historian and philosopher of science Thomas Kuhn, for example, observes that modern science's claim to authority over cosmology creates a built-in friction with all religious cosmologies. An example of this sort of criticism is that the Church opposes particular scientific discoveries that it feels challenges its authority and power. These "softer" versions of conflict theory shift the emphasis away from a crude assertion of a fundamental incompatibility of religion per se and science-in-general to a critique of the structural reasons for the resistance of the Church as a political organization.

In Religion in an Age of Science, the physicist and philosopher Ian Barbour writes that while the "conflict" model can be a reasonable lens to describe the most visible and obvious clashes involving extremist positions of scientific materialism and biblical literalism, there are other kinds of interactions between science and religion that are better described in terms of dialogue or integration. Barbour also describes a fourth "independence" mode. In Science and Religion: Some Historical Perspectives, the science historian John Hedley Brooke notes that a strategy that successfully harmonized religion and science in one era (at least for some) broke down in a later era:

The diversification of the sciences and the theoretical changes within them make it extremely difficult to locate a unique set of principles by which harmony [with religion] could be guaranteed. Among the physical scientists of the seventeenth century it was achieved by stressing the harmony of the universe itself - a divinely conceived harmony, expressible in mathematical terms, and which, Copernicus had declared, it was the duty of the astronomer to display. By the nineteenth century, however, and especially in the life sciences, the metaphysics that had underpinned the work of Copernicus, Kepler and Newton had become obstructive...A metaphysics stressing the invariance of divine ideas created dissonance where it had once created harmony.

== Catholic architects of modern geology, astrophysics, genetics and cosmology ==
While the Scientific Revolution effectively untethered natural philosophy from religion, the Church did not adopt a reflexively hostile attitude toward the accelerating research, invention, and discoveries of an increasingly self-confident "science." The careers of four clergy scientists, each of whom made foundational contributions to modern science, illustrate the Church's continued interest in and engagement with modern efforts to read the Book of Nature.

=== Geology ===
Blessed Nicolas Steno
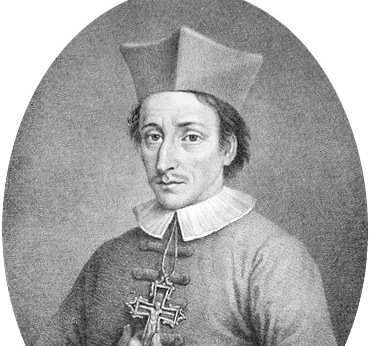
- Known for: Law of superposition Principle of original horizontality Principle of lateral continuity Principle of cross-cutting relationships Law of constancy of interfacial angles
- Scientific career
- Fields: Geology, Crystallography

Orders
- Ordination: 13 April 1675
- Consecration: 19 September 1677

Sainthood
- Beatified: 23 October 1988

In October 1666, fishermen caught a huge shark near the town of Livorno. Ferdinando II de' Medici, Grand Duke of Tuscany, ordered its head to be sent to Nicolas Steno, a Danish anatomist who had moved to Italy. Steno noted that the shark's teeth bore a striking resemblance to objects found embedded within rock formations that his contemporaries called glossopetrae or "tongue stones". Ancient authorities, such as the Roman author Pliny the Elder, in his Naturalis Historia, had suggested that these stones fell from the sky or from the Moon. Fabio Colonna, however, had already shown by burning the material that glossopetrae were actually organic matter (limestone) rather than soil minerals. Building on Colonna's work by using the contemporary corpuscular theory of matter, Steno argued that the chemical composition of fossils could be altered without changing their form.

Steno's work on shark teeth led him to the question of how any solid object could come to be found inside another solid object, such as a rock or a layer of rock. The "solid bodies within solids" that attracted Steensen's interest included not only fossils, as we would define them today, but minerals, crystals, encrustations, veins, and even entire rock layers or strata. His seminal 1669 work, De solido intra solidum naturaliter contento dissertationis prodromus, introduced the fundamental principles of stratigraphy that remain the bedrock of modern geological surveying and make Steno one of the founders of modern geology. The law of superposition, the principle of original horizontality, the principle of lateral continuity and the principle of cross-cutting relationships were all originally proposed by Steno.

Originally a Lutheran, Steno moved to Catholic Italy and, in 1667, converted. Denied office in the Protestant north, he continued his geological studies but in 1675 became a priest and soon after was appointed a bishop, writing 16 major theological works.

=== Astrophysics ===
The Reverend Father Angelo Secchi
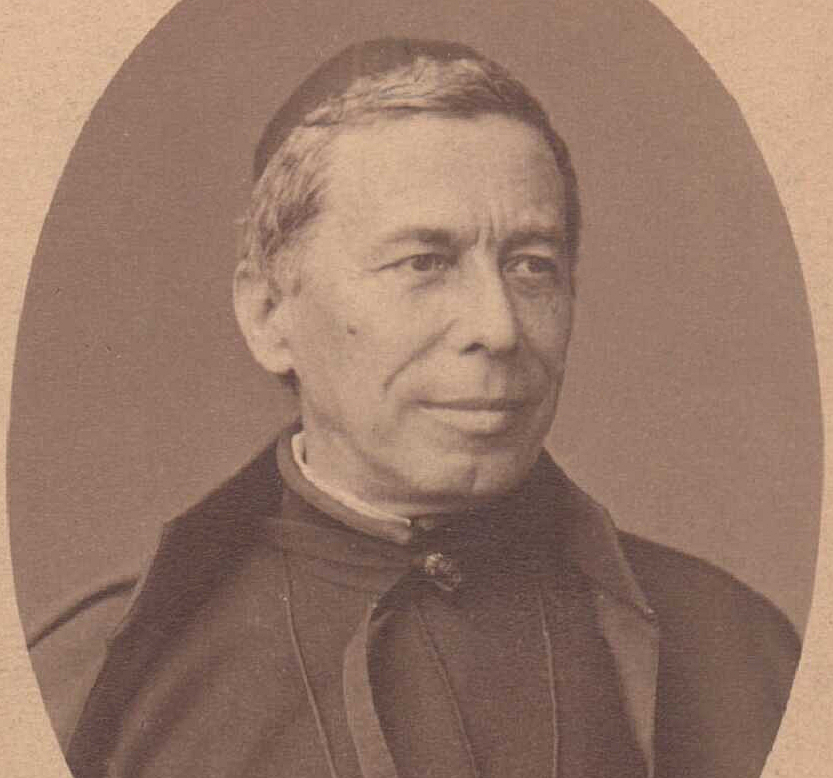
- Known for: Stellar classification Secchi classes
- Scientific career
- Fields: Astrophysics

Ecclesiastical career
- Ordained: 12 September 1847

A new astronomy, soon to be called astrophysics, began to emerge when William Hyde Wollaston and Joseph von Fraunhofer independently discovered that, when decomposing the light from the Sun, a multitude of dark lines (regions where there was less or no light) were observed in the spectrum. By 1860 the physicist, Gustav Kirchhoff, and the chemist, Robert Bunsen, had demonstrated that the dark lines in the solar spectrum corresponded to bright lines in the spectra of known gases, specific lines corresponding to unique chemical elements. Kirchhoff deduced that the dark lines in the solar spectrum are caused by absorption by chemical elements in the Solar atmosphere. In this way it was proved that the chemical elements found in the Sun and stars were also found on Earth.

Starting in 1863 and using instruments of his own invention, including the heliospectrograph, star spectrograph, and telespectroscope, Fr. Angelo Secchi, an Italian Catholic priest and director of the observatory at the Pontifical Gregorian University (then called the Roman College), began collecting the spectra of stars, accumulating some 4,000 stellar spectrograms. Through analysis of this data, he discovered that the stars come in a limited number of distinct types and subtypes, which could be distinguished by their different spectral patterns. From this concept, he developed the first system of stellar classification: the five Secchi classes. While his system was superseded by the Harvard system, he still stands as discoverer of the principle of stellar classification, which is a fundamental element of astrophysics. His recognition of molecular bands of carbon radicals in the spectra of some stars made him the discoverer of carbon stars, which made one of his spectral classes. He also demonstrated that certain absorption lines in the spectrum of the Sun were caused by absorption in the Earth's atmosphere.

=== Genetics ===
The Right Reverend Gregor Mendel
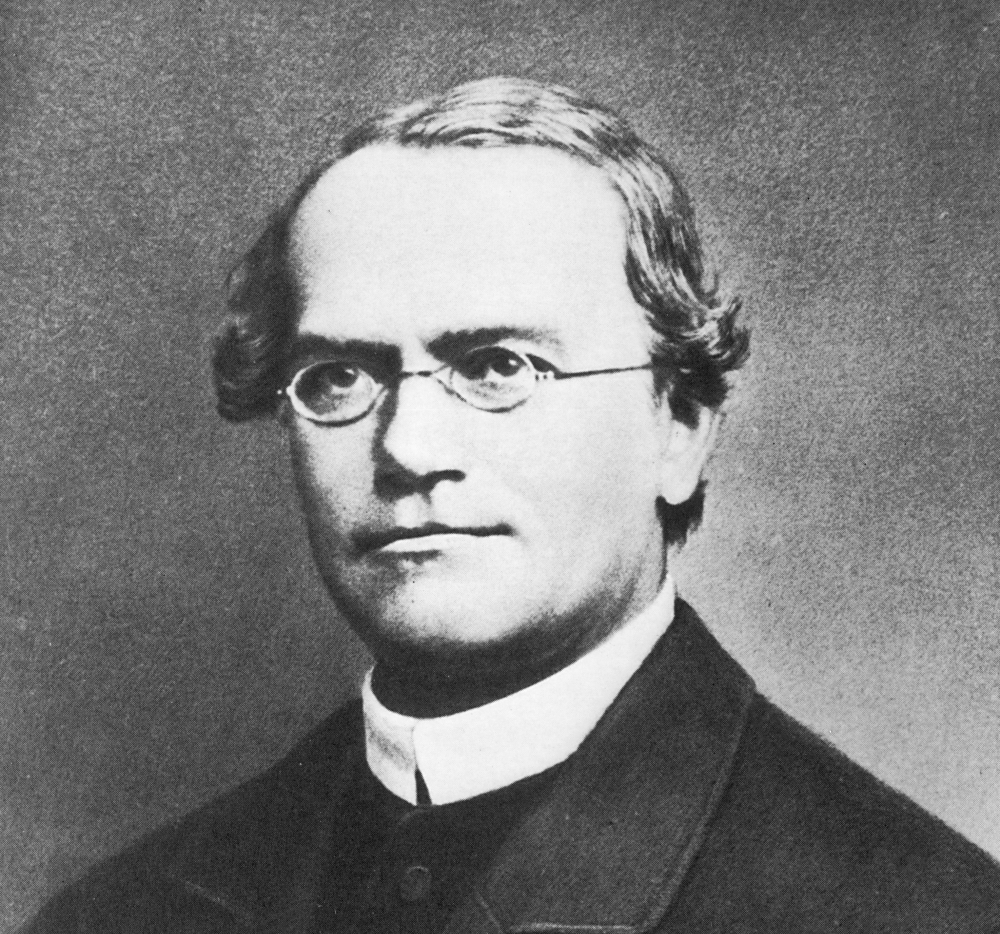
- Known for: Founder of the modern science of genetics
- Scientific career
- Fields: Genetics

Ecclesiastical career
- Ordained: 25 December 1846

Gregor Mendel was an Austrian scientist and Augustinian friar who began experimenting with peas around 1856. Observing the processes of pollination at his monastery in what is now the Czech Republic, Mendel studied and developed theories about the field of science now called genetics. Mendel published his results in 1866 in the Journal of the Brno Natural History Society. The paper was not widely read nor understood, and soon after its publication Mendel was elected abbot of his monastery. He continued experimenting with bees but his work went unrecognized until various scientists resurrected his theories around 1900, after his death. Mendel had joined the Brno Augustinian monastery in 1843, but also trained as a scientist at the Olmutz Philosophical Institute and the University of Vienna. The Brno Monastery was a center of scholarship, with an extensive library and a tradition of scientific research.

Where Charles Darwin's theories suggested a mechanism for improvement of species over generations, Mendel's observations explained how new species could emerge. Though Darwin and Mendel never collaborated, they were aware of each other's work (Darwin read a paper by Wilhelm Olbers Focke which extensively referenced Mendel). Bill Bryson wrote that "without realizing it, Darwin and Mendel laid the groundwork for all of the life sciences in the twentieth century. Darwin saw that all living things are connected, that ultimately they trace their ancestry to a single, common source; Mendel's work provided the mechanism to explain how that could happen." Biologist J. B. S. Haldane and others brought together the principles of Mendelian inheritance with Darwinian principles of evolution to form the field of genetics known as Modern evolutionary synthesis.

=== Physical cosmology ===
The Reverend Monsignor Georges Lemaître
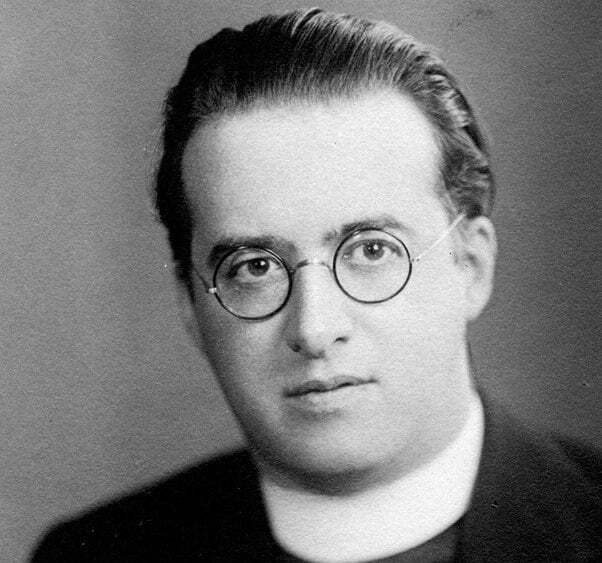
- Known for: Big Bang; Hubble–Lemaître law Friedmann–Lemaître–Robertson–Walker metric Lemaître–Tolman metric Lemaître coordinates Cosmological constant
- Scientific career
- Fields: Physical cosmology

Ecclesiastical career
- Ordained: 22 September 1923

The Big Bang model, or theory, is now the prevailing cosmological theory of the early development of the universe and was first proposed by Belgian priest Georges Lemaître, astronomer and professor of physics at the Catholic University of Leuven, with a Ph.D. from MIT. Lemaître was the first to argue that the recession of galaxies is evidence of an expanding universe and to connect the observational Hubble–Lemaître law with the solution to the Einstein field equations in the general theory of relativity for a homogenous and isotropic universe. That work led Lemaître to propose what he called the "hypothesis of the primeval atom", now regarded as the first formulation of the Big Bang theory of the origin of the universe.

Lemaître viewed his work as a scientist as neither supporting nor contradicting the truths of faith and he was strongly opposed to making any arguments that mixed science with religion (an effort sometimes referred to as concordism), although he held that the two were not in conflict. In a 1933 New York Times article, he asserted, "There is no conflict between religion and science to reconcile." He was always anxious that his work on cosmology should be judged on purely scientific criteria. Lemaître's concern that interactions between religion and science could hinder scientific acceptance as well as leave faith vulnerable to future shifts in scientific theory led historian of science Dominique Lambert to single him out as perhaps modern Catholicism's most prominent "discordist" and leading intellectual opponent of concordism.

Lemaître was reportedly horrified when, in 1951, Pope Pius XII gave an address to the Pontifical Academy of Sciences - with Lemaître in the audience - in which he drew a parallel between the new "Big Bang" cosmology and the Christian doctrine of creatio ex nihilo. Lemaître appealed directly to the Pope to avoid making any further public statements on religious or philosophical interpretations of matters concerning physical cosmology.

== Modern Book of Nature ==
Philosophy [i.e. natural philosophy] is written in this grand book - I mean the Universe - which stands continually open to our gaze...

— Galileo Galilei, The Assayer (1623)

=== Science and salvation ===
...the holy Bible and the phenomena of nature proceed alike from the divine Word, the former as the dictate of the Holy Ghost and the latter as the observant executrix of God's commands.

— Galileo Galilei (1623)

...we cannot but deplore certain habits of mind, which are sometimes found too among Christians, which do not sufficiently attend to the rightful independence of science and which, from the arguments and controversies they spark, lead many minds to conclude that faith and science are mutually opposed.

— Pope Paul VI (1965)

...the new science, with its methods and the freedom of research which they implied, obliged theologians to examine their own criteria of scriptural interpretation ... Galileo, a sincere believer, showed himself to be more perceptive in this regard than the theologians who opposed him.

— Pope John Paul II (1992)

Timeline: Galileo and the Church

- 1633: Galileo sentenced to house arrest.
- 1642: Plans for Galileo to be buried in the main body of the Basilica of Santa Croce, next to the tombs of the ruling family of Tuscany, are abandoned when Pope Urban VIII objects.
- 1718: The Inquisition lifts the ban on reprinting Galileo's works (excluding the condemned Dialogue).
- 1741: Pope Benedict XIV authorizes the publication of Galileo's complete scientific works, including a mildly censored version of the Dialogue. (Note: The uncensored version of the Dialogue remained on the Index of prohibited books, however.)
- 1758: The general prohibition against works advocating heliocentrism is removed from the Index Librorum Prohibitorum, though the specific ban on uncensored versions of the Dialogue and Copernicus's De Revolutionibus remains.
- 1835: All official opposition to heliocentrism by the Church effectively ends as these works are finally dropped from the Index. (Note: McMullin (2005, p.6); Coyne (2005, p.346). The Church's opposition had effectively ended in 1820 when a Catholic canon, Giuseppe Settele, was permitted to publish a work that treated heliocentrism as a physical fact rather than a mathematical fiction. The 1835 edition of the Index was the first to be issued after that year.)
- 1939: In his first speech to the Pontifical Academy of Sciences, Pope Pius XII describes Galileo as being among the "most audacious heroes of research."
- 1979: Pope John Paul II orders a formal re-examination of the evidence against Galileo by the Pontifical Council for Culture.
- 1992: Pope John Paul II expresses formal regret for how the Galileo affair was handled and acknowledges errors committed by the Church tribunal.
- 2008: The Vatican proposes to complete the rehabilitation of Galileo by announcing plans to erect a statue of him inside the Vatican walls.

In the early 17th century, Galileo lost two different arguments with the Church. His first argument, about natural philosophy, was whether the Earth moves. By 1835, however, Galileo had effectively won that argument when the Church removed all works related to heliocentrism from the Index Librorum Prohibitorum. Galileo's second argument, and arguably his more direct provocation to 17th century theologians and the one that more directly led to his arrest, was about the correct way of interpreting Scripture, which he discussed at length in his 1613 Letter to Benedetto Castelli and in his 1615 Letter to the Grand Duchess Christina. By 1893, however, he had won that argument as well.

In 1893, Pope Leo XIII issued the encyclical Providentissimus Deus ("On the Study of Holy Scripture"), which adopted the exact approach to interpreting Scripture that Galileo had advocated for nearly three centuries earlier. Although the encyclical was prompted by 19th-century developments in evolution and geology, its discussion of "figurative language" and the "common manner of speech" essentially reproduced Galileo’s logic and codified Galileo's argument that the Bible's authority is limited to human salvation and does not extend to nature:

...no real disagreement can exist between the theologian and the scientist provided each keeps within his own limits. ...If nevertheless there is a disagreement ... it should be remembered that the sacred writers, or more truly 'the Spirit of God who spoke through them, did not wish to teach men such truths (as the inner structure of visible objects) which do not help anyone to salvation'; and that, for this reason, rather than trying to provide a scientific exposition of nature, they sometimes describe and treat these matters either in a somewhat figurative language or as the common manner of speech those times required, and indeed still requires nowadays in everyday life, even amongst most learned people.

The Galilean principle that science and theology occupy different spheres ("The Holy Ghost intended to teach us how to go to heaven, not how the heavens go.") is now a part of Catholic doctrine. The Catechism of the Catholic Church reinforces this view of science by asserting that scientific "investigation of the secrets of nature" is not a threat to faith but instead an undertaking that - "provided it...does not override moral laws" - is led "by the hand of God": "Methodical research in all branches of knowledge, provided it is carried out in a truly scientific manner and does not override moral laws, can never conflict with the faith because the things of the world and the things of faith derive from the same God. The humble and persevering investigator of the secrets of nature is being led, as it were, by the hand of God despite himself, for it is God, the conserver of all things, who made them what they are."

In 1992, Pope John Paul II wrote that Galileo was "more perceptive" about "scriptural interpretation...than the theologians who opposed him."

=== Evolution ===
The science historian John Hedley Brooke observes that the 17th century metaphysics of devout scientists like Galileo and Kepler and their immediate successors, which saw nature's "immutability" as a reflection of a similarly perfect and changless Creator, was a poor fit for the science of evolution.

The Catholic Church holds no official position on the theory of creation or evolution, leaving the specifics of either theistic evolution or literal creationism to the individual within certain parameters established by the Church. According to the Catechism of the Catholic Church, any believer may accept either literal or special creation within the period of an actual six-day, twenty-four-hour period, or they may accept the belief that the earth evolved over time under the guidance of God. Catholicism holds that God initiated and continued the process of his creation, that Adam and Eve were real people, and that all humans, whether specially created or evolved, have and have always had specially created souls for each individual. Notwithstanding this cautious stance, however, Pope John Paul II wrote in 1996 that evolution is "more than a hypothesis":

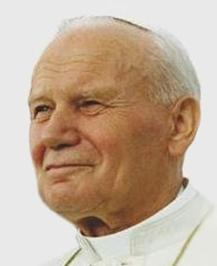
Pope John Paul II told the Pontifical Academy of Sciences in 1996 that since Pius XII's encyclical, "... new findings lead us toward the recognition of evolution as more than a hypothesis."

In his encyclical Humani generis (1950), my predecessor Pius XII has already affirmed that there is no conflict between evolution and the doctrine of the faith regarding man and his vocation, provided that we do not lose sight of certain fixed points. ... Today, more than a half-century after the appearance of that encyclical, some new findings lead us toward the recognition of evolution as more than a hypothesis. In fact it is remarkable that this theory has had progressively greater influence on the spirit of researchers, following a series of discoveries in different scholarly disciplines. The convergence in the results of these independent studies—which was neither planned nor sought—constitutes in itself a significant argument in favor of the theory.

=== Pontifical Academy of Sciences ===
Pontifical Academy of Sciences
- Pontificia accademia delle scienze
- Type: Catholic, Research institute, Pontifical University
- Established: 1936; 90 years ago
- Chancellor: Peter Turkson
- President: Joachim von Braun
- Website: pas.va

The Pontifical Academy of Sciences was founded in 1936 by Pope Pius XI. It draws on many of the world's leading scientists, including many Nobel Laureates, to act as advisors to the Popes on scientific issues. The Academy has an international membership which includes British physicist Stephen Hawking, the astronomer royal Martin Rees, and Nobel laureates such as U.S. physicist Charles Hard Townes.

Under the protection of the reigning Pope, the Academy aims to promote the progress of the mathematical, physical, and natural sciences and the study of related epistemological problems. The Academy has its origins in the Accademia Pontificia dei Nuovi Lincei ("Pontifical Academy of the New Lynxes"), founded in 1847 and intended as a more closely supervised successor to the Accademia dei Lincei ("Academy of Lynxes") established in Rome in 1603 by the learned Roman Prince Federico Cesi (1585–1630) who was a young botanist and naturalist, and which claimed Galileo Galilei as a member.

In 2012 Pope Benedict XVI addressed members of the Academy on the relationship between religion and science:

Dialogue and cooperation between faith and science are urgently needed for building a culture that respects people and the planet.... Without faith and science informing each other, the great questions of humanity leave the domain of reason and truth, and are abandoned to the irrational, to myth, or to indifference, with great damage to humanity itself, to world peace and to our ultimate destiny.... (As people strive to) unlock the mysteries of man and the universe, I am convinced of the urgent need for continued dialogue and cooperation between the worlds of science and of faith in building a culture of respect for man, for human dignity and freedom, for the future of our human family, and for the long-term sustainable development of our planet.

=== Fides et ratio (Faith and reason) ===
In the papal encyclical Fides et ratio issued in 1998, Pope John Paul II wrote of his hope that the "ever greater knowledge" produced by science would always be accompanied by wisdom:

I cannot fail to address a word to scientists, whose research offers an ever greater knowledge of the universe as a whole and of the incredibly rich array of its component parts, animate and inanimate, with their complex atomic and molecular structures. So far has science come, especially in this century, that its achievements never cease to amaze us. In expressing my admiration and in offering encouragement to these brave pioneers of scientific research, to whom humanity owes so much of its current development, I would urge them to continue their efforts without ever abandoning the sapiential horizon within which scientific and technological achievements are wedded to the philosophical and ethical values which are the distinctive and indelible mark of the human person.

== See also ==
- List of Catholic clergy scientists
- List of Catholic scientists
- Science and the Popes
- Christianity and science
- Relationship between religion and science
- Role of the Catholic Church in Western civilization
- List of Christian thinkers in science
- List of Christian Nobel laureates
