= Outline of geology =

Overview of and topical guide to geology

The following outline is provided as an overview of and topical guide to geology:

Geology is a branch of natural science concerned with the Earth and other astronomical bodies, the rocks of which they are composed, and the processes by which they change over time. The name comes from Ancient Greek γῆ (gê) 'earth' and λoγία (-logía) 'study of, discourse'. Modern geology significantly overlaps all other Earth sciences, including hydrology. It is integrated with Earth system science and planetary science.

== Branches of geology ==
Geology applies primarily to Earth, but can be applied to any planet or extraterrestrial body.

=== Geology of Earth ===
Subdisciplines of geology:

- Biogeology – Study of the interactions between the Earth's biosphere and the lithosphere
- Economic geology – Science concerned with earth materials of economic value
- Engineering geology – Application of geology to engineering practice
- Environmental geology – Application of geology to environmental problems
- Geochemistry – Science that applies chemistry to analyze geological systems
- Geologic modelling – Applied science of creating computerized representations of portions of the Earth's crust
- Geomorphology – Scientific study of landforms
- Geophysics – Physics of the Earth and its vicinity
- Historical geology – Study of the geological history of Earth
- Hydrogeology – Study of groundwater's movement and distribution
- Marine geology – Study of the history and structure of the ocean floor
- Mineralogy – Scientific study of minerals and mineralised artifacts
- Mining geology – Extraction of valuable minerals or other geological materials from the Earth
- Paleontology – Study of past life through fossils
- Petroleum geology – Field in geology
- Petrology – Study of rocks in geology
- Sedimentology – Study of natural sediments and their formation processes
- Stratigraphy – Study of rock layers and their formation
- Structural geology – Science of the description and interpretation of deformation in the Earth's crust
- Volcanology – Study of volcanoes

=== Planetary geology ===
See also: Geology of solar terrestrial planets – Geology of Mercury, Venus, Earth, Mars and Ceres

Planetary geology – Geological study of planets

- Geology of Mercury
- Geology of Venus – Geology of second planet from the Sun
- Geology of the Moon – Structure and composition of the Moon
- Geology of Mars – Geology of fourth planet from the Sun
- Geology of Jupiter – Fifth planet from the Sun
- Geology of Saturn – Sixth planet from the Sun
- Geology of Uranus – Seventh planet from the Sun
- Geology of Neptune – Eighth planet from the Sun
- Geology of Triton – Geologic structure and composition of Triton
- Geology of Pluto – Geologic structure and composition of Pluto
- Geology of Charon – Geologic structure and composition of Charon

== Principles of geology ==
- Principle of cross-cutting relationships – Principle that the geologic feature which cuts another is the younger of the two
- Law of included fragments – Clasts in a rock are older than the rock formation
- Principle of uniformitarianism – Assumption that natural laws are constant through time and space
- Principle of original horizontality – Layers of sediment are deposited approximately horizontally under the action of gravity
- Principle of superposition – Law stating that newer strata stack above older ones
- Principle of faunal succession – Concept in geology

=== Geological processes ===
- Petrogenesis – Processes that form rock

== History of geology ==
- History of geology
  - Geological history of Earth
  - Timeline of geology – Chronological list of notable events in the history of the science of geology

== Geologic provinces ==
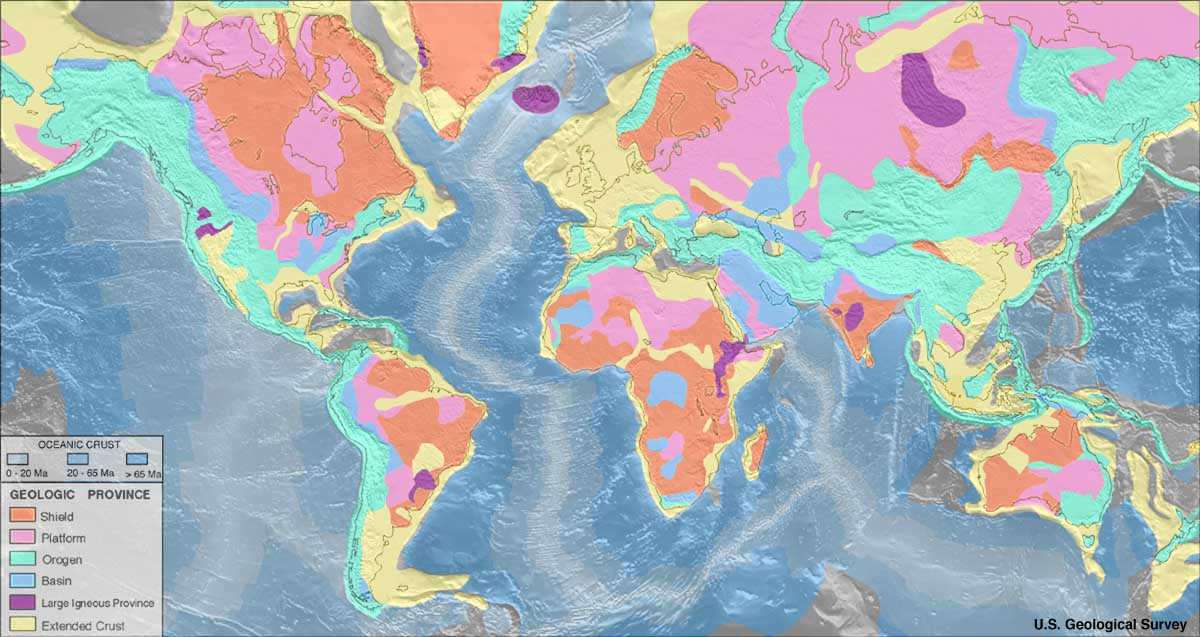
World geologic provinces Oceanic crust 0–20 Ma 20–65 Ma >65 Ma Geologic provinces Shield Platform Orogen Basin Large igneous province Extended crust

Geologic province – Spatial entity with common geologic attributes

Geologic provinces based on origin:

- Shield – Large stable area of exposed Precambrian crystalline rock
  - Platform – Continental area covered by relatively flat or gently tilted, mainly sedimentary strata
- Orogen – Zone affected by mountain formation
  - Island arc – Arc-shaped volcanic archipelago
  - Continental arc – Type of volcanic arc occurring along a continental margin
  - Forearc – Region between an oceanic trench and associated volcanic arc
- Oceanic basin – Geologic basin under the sea
  - Cratonic basin – Old and stable part of the continental lithosphere
  - Foreland basin, also known as foredeep basin – Structural basin that develops adjacent and parallel to a mountain belt
- Large igneous province – Huge regional accumulation of igneous rocks
- Extended crust – Outermost solid shell of astronomical bodies
  - Rift – Geological linear zone where the lithosphere is being pulled apart

== Plate tectonics ==
- Plate tectonics – Movement of Earth's lithosphere

== Occupations in geology ==
The Dictionary of Occupational Titles lists the following occupations in Geology, which it describes as "concerned with the investigation of the composition, structure, and physical and biological history of the earth's crust and the application of this knowledge in such fields as archeology, mining, construction, and environmental impact":

- Crystallographer – Scientific study of crystal structures
- Geodesist
- Geologist – Scientist who studies geology
- Petroleum Geologist – Earth scientist who works in geological aspects of oil discovery and production
- Geophysical Prospector – Systematic collection of geophysical data for spatial studies
- Geophysicist – Physics of the Earth and its vicinity
- Hydrologist – Science of the movement, distribution, and quality of water on Earth
- Mineralogist – Scientific study of minerals and mineralised artifacts
- Paleontologist – Study of past life through fossils
- Petrologist – Study of rocks in geology
- Seismologist – Scientific study of earthquakes and propagation of elastic waves through a planet
- Stratigrapher – Study of rock layers and their formation
- Volcanologist
- Engineer, Soils
- Geophysical-Laboratory Chief (Alternate Titles: Director, Geophysical)
- Geological Aide (Petrol. & Gas)
- Prospector – Physical search for minerals
- Paleontological Helper – Study of past life through fossils
- Laboratory Assistant (Petrol. & Gas) (Alternate Titles: Analyst, Geochemical Prospecting; Core Analyst; Laboratory Tester)

== Influential geologists ==
- List of geologists

== Geology lists ==
- Glossary of geological terms
- Lists of geological features of the Solar System
- Geologic time scale – System that relates geologic strata to time
- List of compounds – Set index article
- Lists of earthquakes
- List of chemical elements
- Geology of the English counties – List of Wikipedia articles on the geology of English counties
- List of geologists
- List of Russian geologists
- List of largest volcanic eruptions
- List of minerals
- List of oil fields – Some of the major oilfields of the past and present
- List of plate tectonics topics – Hierarchical outline list of articles related to plate tectonics
- List of rock types
- List of tectonic plates
- Lists of volcanoes

== See also ==
- Outline of geography – Hierarchical outline list of articles related to geography
- American Geophysical Union
- American Geosciences Institute
- European Geosciences Union
- Geological Society of America
- Geological Society of London
