= Principles of geology =

- For an overview of Geology see Outline of geology.
- For dating techniques based on Geology see Relative dating.
- For the 1830s book by Charles Lyell, see Principles of Geology.
