= Principle of faunal succession =

Concept in geology

The principle of faunal succession, also known as the law of faunal succession, is based on the observation that sedimentary rock strata contain fossilized flora and fauna, and that these fossils succeed each other vertically in a specific, reliable order that can be identified over wide horizontal distances. A fossilized Neanderthal bone (less than 500,000 years old) will never be found in the same stratum as a fossilized Megalosaurus (about 160 million years old), for example, because neanderthals and megalosaurs lived during different geological periods, separated by millions of years. This allows for strata to be identified and dated by the fossils found within.

This principle, which received its name from the English geologist William Smith, is of great importance in determining the relative age of rocks and strata. The fossil content of rocks together with the law of superposition helps to determine the time sequence in which sedimentary rocks were laid down.

Evolution explains the observed faunal and floral succession preserved in rocks. Faunal succession was documented by Smith in England during the first decade of the 19th century, and concurrently in France by Cuvier (with the assistance of the mineralogist Alexandre Brongniart). Archaic biological features and organisms are succeeded in the fossil record by more modern versions. For instance, paleontologists investigating the evolution of birds predicted that feathers would first be seen in primitive forms on flightless predecessor organisms such as feathered dinosaurs. This is precisely what has been discovered in the fossil record: simple feathers, incapable of supporting flight, are succeeded by increasingly large and complex feathers.

In practice, the most useful diagnostic species are those with the fastest rate of species turnover and the widest distribution; their study is termed biostratigraphy, the science of dating rocks by using the fossils contained within them. In Cenozoic strata, fossilized tests of foraminifera are often used to determine faunal succession on a refined scale, each biostratigraphic unit (biozone) being a geological stratum that is defined on the basis of its characteristic fossil taxa. An outline microfaunal zonal scheme based on both foraminifera and ostracoda was compiled by M. B. Hart (1972).

Earlier fossil life forms are simpler than more recent forms, and more recent fossil forms are more similar to living forms (principle of faunal succession).

== See also ==
- Index fossil
- Law of superposition
- Principle of cross-cutting relationships
- Principle of lateral continuity
- Principle of original horizontality
- History of paleontology
