= Science and the Popes =

Science and the Popes is a part of the broader subject of science and the Catholic Church. Science and the popes have had a long relationship throughout the history of the Catholic Church. As the church believes the pope is the vicar of Christ, Catholics respect the pope's non-infallible personal opinions on non-theological subjects such as science. While there are ancient patron saints of medical topics, such as Saint Pantaleon, who was invoked during the Black Death, it is not known which pope canonized them.

== Middle ages ==
=== 11th century ===
==== Innocent III ====
On 23 April 1198, Innocent III approved of the religious order Order of the Holy Ghost, which took care of sick laypersons. Innocent III also founded Santo Spirito Hospital in Rome.

== Renaissance ==
=== 15th century ===
==== Paul IV ====
For being a Protestant, Conrad Gessner's work, Historiae animalium, was put on the Index of Prohibited Books by Pope Paul IV.

==== Gregory XIII ====
The Gregorian calendar was introduced by Pope Gregory XIII, after whom the calendar was named, by a decree signed on 24 February 1582.

== Early modernity ==
=== 17th century ===
==== Paul V ====
Pope Paul V instructed Cardinal Bellarmine to inform Galileo that Copernican heliocentrism could not be taught as fact. He also told Galileo that he was personally safe from persecution so long as he, the Pope, was alive.

==== Urban VIII ====
Pope Urban VIII had Galileo's book put on the Index of Prohibited Books and had Galileo himself sentenced to lifelong house arrest for heresy for "following the position of Copernicus, which is contrary to the true sense and authority of Holy Scripture."

==== Alexander VII ====
Pope Alexander VII issued the 1664 papal bull Speculatores Domus Israel, which reaffirmed the Church's prohibition of all works teaching the motion of the Earth.

=== 19th century ===
==== Pius IX ====
At the First Vatican Council, convoked by Pope Pius IX, it was declared dogma that God can be known by reason alone and that faith and reason are both from God and cannot contradict each other.

==== Leo XIII ====
On 18 November 1893, Pope Leo XIII issued Providentissimus Deus. In it, he said that "no real disagreement can exist between the theologian and the scientist provided each keeps within his own limits. ...If nevertheless there is a disagreement ... it should be remembered that the sacred writers, or more truly ‘the Spirit of God who spoke through them, did not wish to teach men such truths (as the inner structure of visible objects) which do not help anyone to salvation’; and that, for this reason, rather than trying to provide a scientific exposition of nature, they sometimes describe and treat these matters either in a somewhat figurative language or as the common manner of speech those times required, and indeed still requires nowadays in everyday life, even amongst most learned people."

== Modernity ==
=== 20th century ===
==== Pius XI ====
In 1936, Pope Pius XI refounded the Pontifical Academy of Sciences with the goal of making it the Church's "scientific senate". When deciding the academy's composition, he was opposed to any racial or religious discrimination; he appointed over 80 academicians from a variety of backgrounds, countries, and research areas.

==== Pius XII ====
In 1939, Pope Pius XII described Galileo as being among the "most audacious heroes of research ... not afraid of the stumbling blocks and the risks on the way, nor fearful of the funereal monuments."

In the 1950 encyclical Humani generis, Pius XII accepted evolution as a possibility and a legitimate field of study to investigate the origins of the human body, while emphasising that "the Catholic faith obliges us to hold that souls are immediately created by God."

==== John Paul II ====
In Fides et Ratio, Pope John Paul II said, "faith and reason are like two wings on which the human spirit rises to the contemplation of truth; and God has placed in the human heart a desire to know the truth – in a word, to know himself – so that, by knowing and loving God, men and women may also come to the fullness of truth about themselves."

In Veritatis splendor, John Paul II, quoting the Second Vatican Council, said that abortion is an "intrinsically evil act."

==== Benedict XVI ====
On July 25, 2007, Pope Benedict XVI said that the clash between creation and evolution "is an absurdity because on one hand there is much scientific proof in favor of evolution, which appears as a reality that we must see and which enriches our understanding of life and being as such."

In his spiritual testament, Benedict XVI said:

It often seems that science...are able to offer irrefutable results at odds with the Catholic faith...on the contrary, apparent certainties against the faith have vanished, proving to be not science, but philosophical interpretations only apparently pertaining to science;...with the succession of different generations I have seen theses that seemed unshakable collapse, proving to be mere hypotheses: the liberal generation (Harnack, Jülicher etc.), the existentialist generation (Bultmann etc.), the Marxist generation. I saw and see how out of the tangle of assumptions the reasonableness of faith emerged and emerges again.

==== Francis ====
The papacy of Pope Francis saw a major focus on climate change. The New York Times stated that "Francis reiterated the established science that burning fossil fuels are warming the planet, said the impact threatened the world's poor, and called for government policies to cut fossil fuel use."

In a July 2, 2021 video message, Francis said that there "cannot and must not be any opposition between faith and science."
