= John Hedley Brooke =

British historian of science (born 1944)

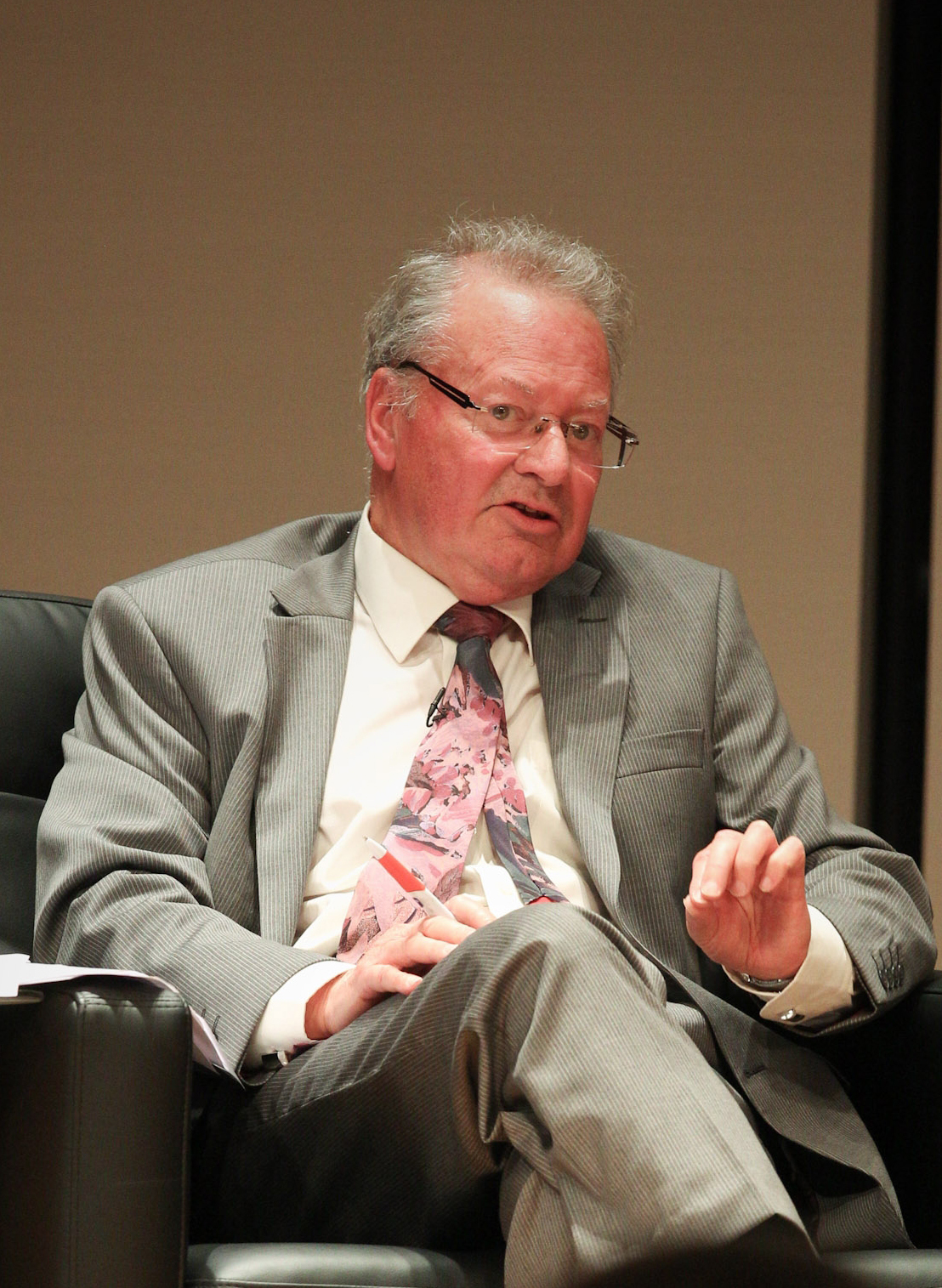
- Brooke at the Chemical Heritage Foundation in 2012
- Born: 20 May 1944 (age 82)
- Spouse: Janice Marian Heffer (m. 1972)

Academic background
- Education: Fitzwilliam College, Cambridge
- Thesis: The Role of Analogical Argument in the Development of Organic Chemistry (1969)

Academic work
- Discipline: History
- Sub-discipline: History of science
- Institutions: Lancaster University; Harris Manchester College, Oxford
- Main interests: Relationship between science and religion
- Website: johnhedleybrooke.com

John Hedley Brooke (born 20 May 1944) is a British historian of science specialising in the relationship between science and religion.

== Biography ==
Born on 20 May 1944, Brooke is the son of Hedley Joseph Brooke, and Margaret Brooke, née Brown. He was educated at King Edward VI Grammar School, Retford, then Fitzwilliam College, Cambridge. On 30 August 1972, he married Janice Marian Heffer.

=== Academic career ===
He was a Research Fellow at Fitzwilliam College from 1967 to 1968, then a Tutorial Fellow at the University of Sussex from 1968 to 1969. He was on the faculty of Lancaster University from 1969 to 1999, rising from Lecturer to Professor of History of Science. With Geoffrey Cantor he gave the Gifford Lectures at the University of Glasgow in 1995. He was appointed the first Andreas Idreos Professor of Science and Religion at The University of Oxford in 1999, where he directed the Ian Ramsey Centre and was a Fellow of Harris Manchester College, Oxford. After his retirement in 2006, he became an Emeritus Fellow of Harris Manchester College and was a Distinguished Fellow of the Institute of Advanced Study in the University of Durham in 2007.

He was the editor of the British Journal for the History of Science from 1989 to 1993. He was the president of the British Society for the History of Science from 1996 to 1998, and has been the president of Science and Religion Forum since 2006. He was also the president of the International Society for Science and Religion (ISSR) from 2008 to 2011. Brooke was subsequently made an Honorary Fellow (HonFISSR).

Evaluations of John Hedley Brooke's contribution to the historiography of "science and religion" can be found in: Science and Religion: New Historical Perspectives (ed. T Dixon, G N Cantor and S Pumfrey) 2010 and Rethinking History, Science and Religion: An Exploration of Conflict and the Complexity Principle (ed. B Lightman) 2019

== Publications ==
=== Books ===
- Science and Religion: Some Historical Perspectives (1991 and 2014)
- Thinking About Matter (1995)
- Reconstructing Nature: The Engagement of Science and Religion (with G. N. Cantor, 1998)
- Science in Theistic Contexts (ed. 2001)
- Heterodoxy in Early Modern Science and Religion (ed. 2005)
- Religious Values and the Rise of Science in Europe (ed. 2005)
- Science & Religion around the World (ed. 2011)

Other publications number more than one hundred journal articles and book chapters including contributions to:The Cambridge Companion to Darwin; The Cambridge Companion to the "Origin of Species"; The Cambridge Companion to Science and Religion

The Oxford Handbook of Religion and Science; The Oxford Handbook of Nineteenth-Century British Philosophy; The Oxford Handbook of the Reception History of the Bible; The Oxford Handbook of Natural Theology (editorial consultant)

== Quotes ==
- ...I believe we have to revisit and resist the common assumption that scientific progress has been the main cause of secularisation.

Academic offices
Preceded by	Gifford Lecturer at the University of Glasgow; 1995–1996; With: Geoffrey Cantor	Succeeded by
New office	Andreas Idreos Professor of Science and Religion; 1999–?	Succeeded by Peter Harrison
Professional and academic associations
Preceded by	President of the International; Society for Science and Religion; 2008–2011	Succeeded by
Preceded by D. M. Knight	President of the British Society for the History of Science; 1996–1998	Succeeded by Ludmilla Jordanova
