= Letter to the Grand Duchess Christina =

Essay by Galileo

The letter to the Grand Duchess Christina is an essay written in 1615 by Galileo Galilei. The intention of this letter was to accommodate Copernicanism with the doctrines of the Catholic Church. Galileo tried to use the ideas of Church Fathers and Doctors to show that any condemnation of Copernicanism would be inappropriate. The letter has been described as a hallmark in the history of the relationship between science and theology, and a founding text of the Scientific Revolution.

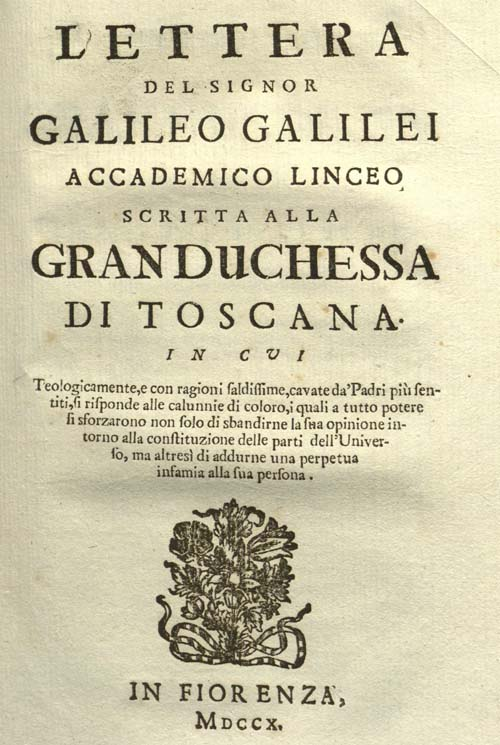
Cover of Galileo's Letter to the Grand Duchess Christina, printing of 1705

== Background ==
Christina was the daughter of Charles III of Lorraine and granddaughter of Catherine de' Medici.

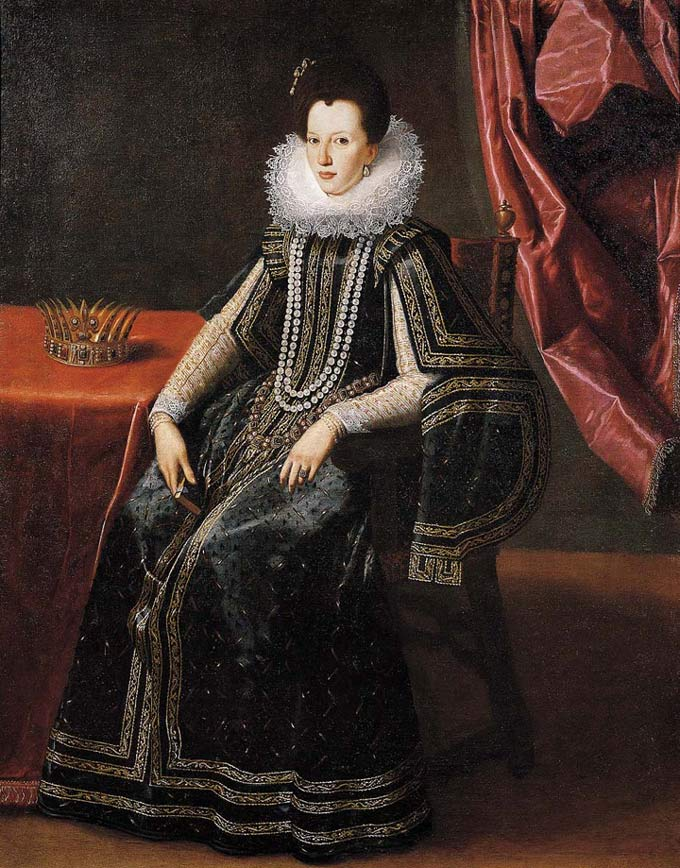
Tiberio Titi – Portrait of Christine of Lorraine Medici, 1600

In 1611 Galileo was informed by a friend, Cigoli, that "ill-disposed men envious of your virtue and merits met [to discuss]... any means by which they could damage you." The number of scholars who disagreed with his Discourse on Floating Bodies, or were simply ill-disposed toward Galileo grew, but other than one letter from Niccolò Lorini there was not much discussion about the issue for the remainder of the year.

Late in 1613, Galileo's former student Benedetto Castelli, a Benedictine monk and lecturer in mathematics at the University of Pisa, wrote to Galileo about the events at a recent breakfast in Pisa with the Grand Duke Cosimo II de' Medici. In the course of conversation at the breakfast Cosimo Boscaglia, a professor of philosophy, argued that the motion of the Earth could not be true, being contrary to the Bible, and thus a heresy. After breakfast ended, Castelli was called back to respond to scriptural arguments against the motion of the Earth from Christina. Castelli took on the role of theologian in response, and convinced everyone there except the Duchess (who he thought was arguing mainly to hear his answers) and Boscaglia (who said nothing during this dialogue). Galileo decided to address Christina because of her desire to learn more about astronomy. Christina's position of power would also give the letter more exposure to other nobles and Church leaders.

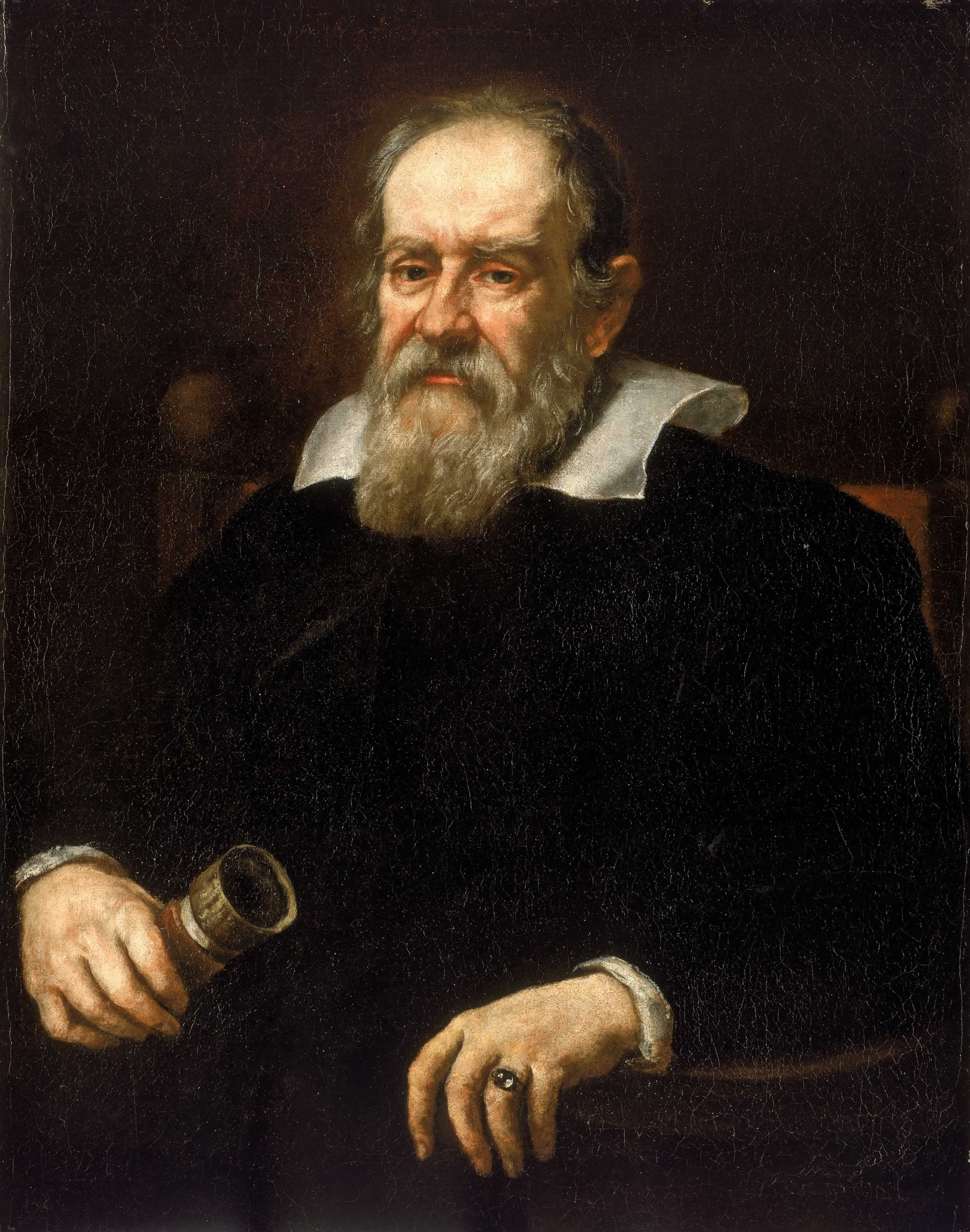
Justus Sustermans – Portrait of Galileo Galilei, 1636

Galileo replied to Castelli with a long letter laying out his position on the relation between science and Scripture. By 1615, with the controversy over the Earth's motion becoming more widespread and increasingly dangerous, Galileo revised this letter and greatly expanded it; this became the Letter to the Grand Duchess Christina. The letter circulated in manuscript but was not printed until much later, after the Inquisition had condemned Galileo. It appeared in Strasbourg in 1636 with both Italian and Latin text. It was suppressed in Catholic jurisdictions, as were all works of Galileo at that period which dealt with that subject.

== Contents of letter ==
Galileo outlined his argument as follows:

I hold the sun to be situated motionless in the center of the revolution of the celestial orbs while the earth rotates on its axis and revolves about the sun. They know also that I support this position not only by refuting the arguments of Ptolemy and Aristotle ... especially some pertaining to physical effects whose causes perhaps cannot be determined in any other way, and other astronomical discoveries; these discoveries clearly confute the Ptolemaic system, and they agree admirably with this other position and confirm it.

To further support his argument, Galileo outlines two key premises:

1. God has created Scripture and nature. They cannot contradict each other.
2. Nature is independent of accommodation, but Scripture is produced to accommodate.

Galileo argues that these premises, when taken together, mean that when sensory information contradicts a long-held understanding of Scripture, a new reading must be considered in light of that information.

Throughout the letter, Galileo includes quotes from St. Augustine. For example, he cites, "If anyone shall set the authority of Holy Writ against clear and manifest reason, he who does this knows not what he has undertaken; for he opposes to the truth not the meaning of the Bible, which is beyond his comprehension, but rather his own interpretation, not what is in the Bible, but what he has found in himself and imagines to be there."

=== Doctrine of Accommodation ===
Galileo argues that the Bible is written in a way that is accessible to even uneducated people. Therefore, every word in the Bible cannot be taken literally. He cites an example in which God is described as having hands, which St. Augustine elucidated as not being literal. Further, Galileo cites Cardinal Baronio: "[The] intention of the Holy Spirit is to teach us how one goes to heaven and not how heaven goes."

=== Queen of sciences ===
Galileo was writing this letter in the context of an ongoing debate about the relationship between theology and philosophy. From medieval times, theology was known as the queen of sciences. Galileo reinterprets this phrase to distinguish the areas of theology vs philosophy. He rejects the belief that theology is the queen because it includes knowledge of all scientific fields. Instead, he says that theology is the queen because it is a vehicle to the highest knowledge of attaining salvation.

== Methodology of the letter ==
Galileo starts the letter with a little flattery of the Grand Duchess. He tries to build her up as an authority figure and then presents his own credentials to show that he has similar authority. Since the Grand Duchess was a person of high authority but did not have much knowledge in the field of astronomy, Galileo wrote the letter in a manner understandable to a layperson. He attempts to attain the sympathy of the Duchess by mentioning the unfair attacks made against his honor. He tried to portray "himself as a man of good will who seeks only to disclose the truth." He states he was motivated to write the letter to justify himself to men of religion he holds in great esteem. The letter can also be seen as a political move for Galileo since having a highly influential and powerful figure on his side would benefit him.

== Joshua argument ==
Critics of the Copernican system used the Battle of Gibeon from the tenth chapter of the Book of Joshua as scriptural evidence against heliocentrism. In the chapter, Joshua asks God to stop the Sun in order to lengthen the day and allow the Israelites to win the battle. When taken literally, this story implies that the Sun is mobile.

Galileo adopts an Augustinian perspective, while also marginalizing it later. In the Letter to the Grand Duchess he references Augustine of Hippo's work De Genesi ad litteram, which calls for either a compromise between literal translation of scripture and astronomy or an allegorical standpoint, which could resolve future astronomical conflicts arising that could jeopardize the validity of the Bible.

Whereas his critics took the stopping of the Sun to mean that Sun halts its orbit around the Earth, Galileo interpreted it with a different astronomical viewpoint. He claimed that God stopped the rotation of the Sun rather than its supposed orbital motion. Arguing that the rotation of the Sun drives the entire planetary system, including the daily rotation of the Earth on its axis, he concluded that when God stopped the Sun from spinning, this also stopped the Earth's rotation and so lengthened the day, as Joshua wished. Galileo thus argued that his Copernican reading of the Joshua passage was in fact more literal than the traditional geocentric reading. Galileo did not, however, see this as real evidence in favor of Copernicanism, but simply as a debating point: even if we played by his opponents' rules and gave scientific weight to literal readings of scripture, Copernicanism still won out.

== Reception ==
Galileo wrote the letter to the Grand Duchess in an effort to convince her of the compatibility of Copernicanism and Scripture. This served as a treatise under the disguise of a letter, with the purpose of addressing the politically powerful, as well as his fellow mathematicians and philosophers. The goal of the secondary audience was targeted to whom he believed was condemning Copernicus. The failure of this stratagem was that he used Christina as his titular audience, instead of the shadow audience he truly sought to persuade. The result was that he was attempting to move an audience unfamiliar with his chosen topic, instead of those who were already disposed on the topic of the movement of the heavens.

"With his deprecating tone Galileo effectively marks off a group of philosophers and theologians as adversaries whose faults he proceeds to define". Within that group were progressive Aristotelians, including Bishop Dini, Cardinals Bellarmine and Barberini, as well as famous Jesuit astronomers at the Collegio Romano (Roman College). These men were open to scientific demonstration to progress Copernicus' theories, however Galileo attacks them stating that they "determine in 'hypocritical zeal' to preserve at all costs what they believe, rather than admit what is obvious to their eyes." This compounds his problems rather than aiding him. Moreover, his letter misses out on key facts that include the Church's non-attacking stance on Copernicus when the canon proposed his heliocentric model. A Dominican theologian Tolosani made an unpublished attack on the Copernican system as early as 1544.

Furthermore, the tone of the letter was combative and overly proud. "Many resented his arrogant tone, his presumption for speaking on theological matters, and for crossing over from the world of mathematical astronomy into the world of natural philosophy." "But he has ruined himself by being so much in love with his own genius and having no respect for others. One should not wonder that everyone conspires to damn him."

== Sources ==
- Stillman Drake (translator and editor) (1957). Discoveries and Opinions of Galileo. New York: Doubleday Anchor Books. ISBN 0-385-09239-3. This has the full text of the letter, with commentary, as well as other short works of Galileo.
- Maurice A. Finocchiario (1989). The Galileo Affair. University of California Press. ISBN 978-0-520-06662-5. This compilation of relevant original documents also includes a 43-page introduction by the author.
