= De Genesi ad litteram =

415 exegesis by Augustine of Hippo

De Genesi ad litteram (Ecclesiastical Latin: [de ˈdʒenezi ad ˈlitteram], Classical Latin: [deː ˈɡɛnɛsiː ad ˈlɪttɛrãː]; Literal Commentary on Genesis) is an exegetical reading of the Book of Genesis written in Latin by Augustine of Hippo. Likely completed in AD 415, this work was Augustine's second attempt to literally interpret the Genesis narrative. De Genesi ad litteram is divided into 12 books and discusses the seven days of creation (books 1–5), the second creation narrative and the Garden of Eden story (books 6–11), and the "Third Heaven" mentioned in 2 Corinthians 12:2-4 (book 12).

== Contents ==
One of the more notable assertions made by Augustine in De Genesi ad litteram is the idea that everything in the universe was created simultaneously in eternity by God and that the six-day structure presented in the book of Genesis represents how creation manifested itself in a temporal sense. This work also saw Augustine reject the transmigration of souls, Tertullian's idea that the soul is corporeal, and the idea of pre-existent souls.

While De Genesi ad litteram does not reject allegorical exegesis, it does argue that this cannot be the only approach a theologian takes. In this way, Augustine breaks from the interpretive methods favored by Philo and Origen. Augustine argues that objections brought against the literal truth of the first chapters of Genesis invariably rest upon the baseless assumption that the objector has found the true meaning of the text.

Augustine recommends prudence when multiple interpretations of a passage are possible, and warns against presenting specific readings as if they are absolute and unquestionable, in order to avoid experts in fields outside of theology seeing Christians as naive, and devaluing the Bible itself as a result.

In matters that are obscure and far beyond our vision, even in such as we may find treated in Holy Scripture, different Interpretations are sometimes possible without prejudice to the faith we have received. In such a case, we should not rush in headlong and so firmly take our stand on one side that, if further progress in the search of truth justly undermines this position, we too fall with it. That would be to battle not for the teaching of Holy Scripture but for our own, wishing its teaching to conform to ours, whereas we ought to wish ours to conform to that of Sacred Scripture. [...]

Usually, even a non-Christian knows something about the earth, the heavens, and the other elements of this world, about the motion and orbit of the stars [...] and so forth, and this knowledge he holds to as being certain from reason and experience. Now, it is a disgraceful and dangerous thing for an infidel to hear a Christian, presumably giving the meaning of Holy Scripture, talking non-sense on these topics; and we should take all means to prevent such an embarrassing situation, in which people show up vast ignorance in a Christian and laugh it to scorn. The shame is not so much that an ignorant individual is derided, but that people outside the household of the faith think our sacred writers held such opinions, and, to the great loss of those for whose salvation we toil, the writers of our Scripture are criticized and rejected as unlearned men. [...]

This passage was quoted by Galileo Galilei in his 1615 essay Letter to the Grand Duchess Christina, during the eponymous Galileo affair, in which he tried unsuccessfully to dissuade the Catholic church from supporting the geocentric model over the (now known to be correct) heliocentric model. Galileo's essay has been described as a hallmark in the history of the relationship between science and theology, and a founding text of the Scientific Revolution. De Genesi, and this passage in particular, have also been referenced in contemporary religious debates about evolution and Young Earth creationism.

== Editio princeps ==
Date	Author	Title	Printer	Location	Notes
1506	Augustinus	De Genesi ad litteram	Johannes Amerbach	Basel	Published in D. Augustini Opera, an edition in nine volumes.
