= Science and Religion: Some Historical Perspectives =

1991 book by John Hedley Brooke

- Author: John Hedley Brooke
- Publisher: Cambridge University Press
- Publication date: 1991
- ISBN: 0-521-28374-4
- OCLC: 22451451
- Dewey Decimal: 291.1/75 20
- LC Class: BL245 .B77 1991

Science and Religion: Some Historical Perspectives is a book on the relationship between science and religion by John Hedley Brooke.

The book identifies three traditional views of the relationship between science and religion found in historical analyses: conflict, complementarity, and commonality. The book portrays all three as oversimplifications. It offers up the alternative notion of complexity, which bases the relationship between science and religion on changing circumstances where it is defined upon each particular historical situation and the actual beliefs and ideas of the scientific and religious figures involved.

== Reception ==
The American Historical Review states that the book's bibliographic essay "identifies and … incorporates the results of virtually every significant and relevant article published in the past fifty years."

== List of reviews ==
- Cantor, Geoffrey (1992). "Science and Religion (Book Reviews)". The Times Literary Supplement (4639): 27.
- Howell, Kenneth J. (December 1994). "Book Review: Science and Religion: Some Historical Perspectives. John Hedley Brooke, George Basalla". The Journal of Modern History. 66 (4): 779–782. doi:10.1086/244944.
- Olson, Richard; Brooke, John Hedley (February 1994). "Reviews of Books: Science and Religion Some Historical Perspectives" (PDF). American Historical Review. 99 (1). American Historical Association: 191–192. doi:10.2307/2166181. hdl:1887/10459. JSTOR 2166181.
- Pallin, David A. (1992). "Reviews: Science and Religion: Some Historical Perspectives". The Journal of Theological Studies. 43 (2): 797–800. doi:10.1093/jts/43.2.797.
- Tollefson, R.J. (1992). "Science and Religion (Book Reviews)". Choice: Current Reviews for Academic Libraries. 29 (8): 1244–1245.
