= Principle of lateral continuity =

Schematic representation of the principle of lateral continuity.

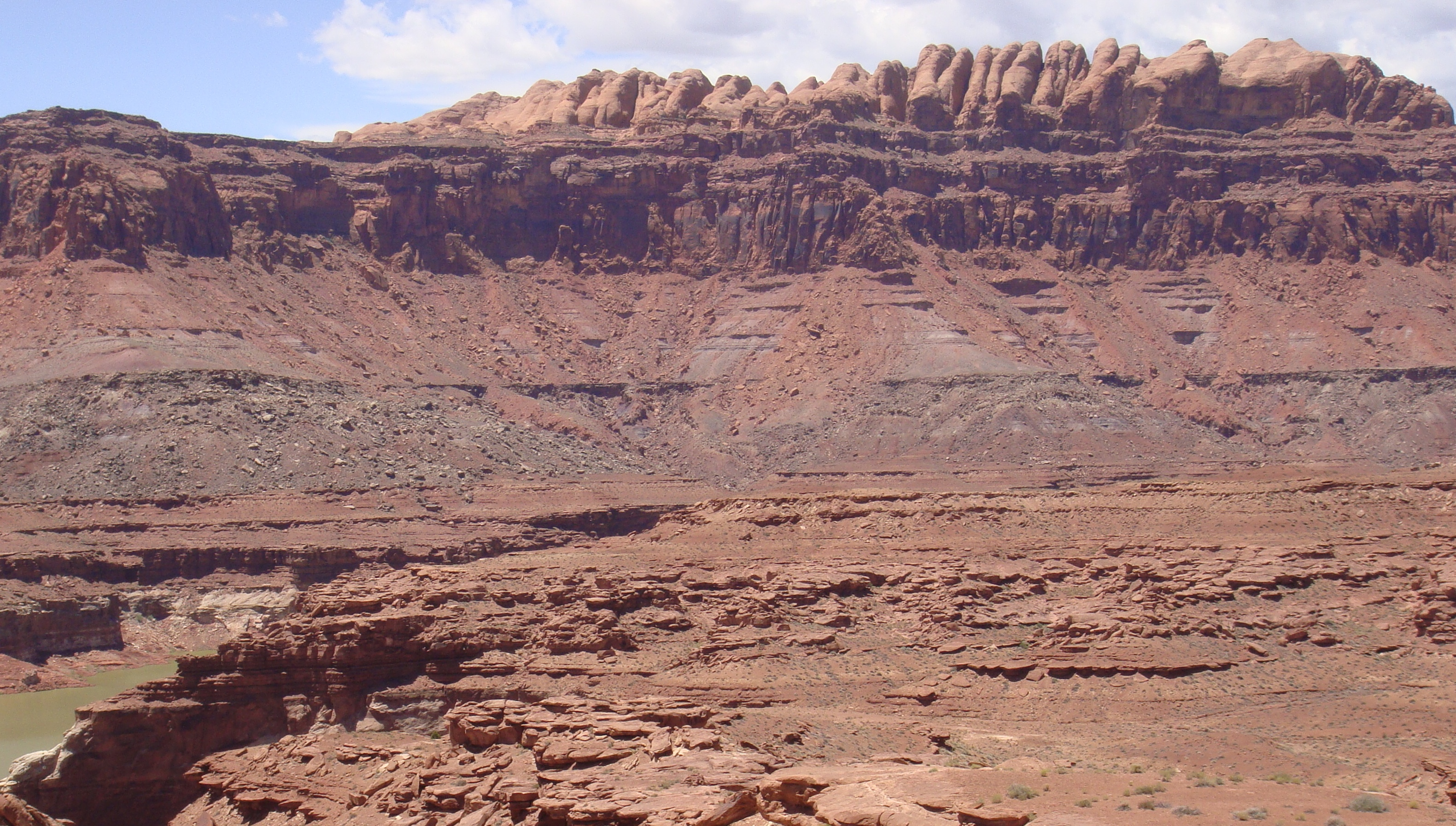
The Permian through Jurassic strata of the Colorado Plateau area of southeastern Utah that makes up much of the famous prominent rock formations in widely spaced protected areas such as Capitol Reef National Park and Canyonlands National Park. From top to bottom: Rounded tan domes of the Navajo Sandstone, layered red Kayenta Formation, cliff-forming, vertically-jointed, red Wingate Sandstone, slope-forming, purplish Chinle Formation, layered, lighter-red Moenkopi Formation, and white, layered Cutler Formation sandstone. Picture from Glen Canyon National Recreation Area, Utah.

The principle of lateral continuity states that layers of sediment initially extend laterally in all directions; in other words, they are laterally continuous. As a result, rocks that are otherwise similar, but are now separated by a valley or other erosional feature, can be assumed to be originally continuous.

Layers of sediment do not extend indefinitely; rather, the limits can be recognized and are controlled by the amount and type of sediment available and the size and shape of the sedimentary basin. As long as sediment is transported to an area, it will eventually be deposited. However, as the amount of material lessens away from the source, the layer of that material will become thinner.

Often, coarser-grained material can no longer be transported to an area because the transporting medium has insufficient energy to carry it to that location. In its place, the particles that settle from the transporting medium will be finer-grained, and there will be a lateral transition from coarser- to finer-grained material. The lateral variation in sediment within a stratum is known as sedimentary facies.

If sufficient sedimentary material is available, it will be deposited up to the limits of the sedimentary basin. Often, the sedimentary basin is within rocks that are very different from the sediments that are being deposited. In those cases, the lateral limits of the sedimentary layer will be marked by an abrupt change in rock type.
