= Pomerance Award for Scientific Contributions to Archaeology =

The Pomerance Award for Scientific Contributions to Archaeology, also known as the Pomerance Science Medal, is "one of the two highest awards granted annually" by the Archaeological Institute of America, given to a scientist or group of scientists who have worked in the field of archaeology.

The award is named for Leon Pomerance and Harriet Kline Pomerance, American amateur archaeologists who endowed scholarships and awards with the AIA. The first Pomerance Award was presented to Marie Farnsworth, a chemist, in 1980.

== Recipients ==
Year	Awardee	notes
2026	Organic Geochemistry Unit at the University of Bristol (Richard Evershed, Lucy Cramp, and Mélanie Roffet-Salque)	
2025	Christine Hastorf	
2024	Deborah M. Pearsall	
2023	Julia Lee-Thorp	
2022	Matthew Collins	
2021	Paula Reimer	
2020	Heather Lechtman	
2019	Robert E. M. Hedges	
2018	Mark Pollard	
2017	Curtis Marean	
2016	Melinda A. Zeder	
2015	T. Douglas Price	
2014	Waldo R. Tobler	
2013	Stephen Weiner	
2012	David P. S. Peacock	
2011	Michael D. Glascock	
2010	Paul Goldberg	
2009	Dolores Piperno	
2008	Michael S. Tite	
2007	Patty Jo Watson	
2006	Pamela B. Vandiver	
2005	Jane Buikstra	
2004	Ian Freestone	
2003	Peter Ian Kuniholm	
2002	Garman Harbottle	
2001	Curt Werner Beck	
2000	(no award)	
1999	Edward V. Sayre	
1998	Nikolaas J. van der Merwe	
1997	Martin Aitken	
1996	W. David Kingery	
1995	Norman Herz	
1994	Robert Maddin, James Muhly, Tamara Stech	
1993	Michael G. L. Baillie, Bernd Becker, Bernd Kromer, Gordon W. Pearson, Jon R. Pilcher, Minze Stuiver, and Hans Suess	
1992	(no award)	
1991	Karl Butzer	
1990	Robert H. Brill	
1989	Harold Edgerton	
1988	George (Ripp) Rapp Jr.	
1987	George Cowgill	
1986	Elizabeth K. Ralph	
1985	Charles A. Reed	
1984	Herbert E. Wright Jr.	
1983	J. Lawrence Angel	
1982	Cyril Stanley Smith	
1981	Frederick R. Matson	
1980	Marie Farnsworth	
