= Research Laboratory for Archaeology and the History of Art =

English research laboratory

The Research Laboratory for Archaeology and the History of Art (RLAHA) is a laboratory at the University of Oxford, England which develops and applies scientific methods to the study of the past. It was established in 1955 and its first director was Teddy Hall. The first deputy director was Dr Stuart Young, who was followed by Martin Aitken in 1957. After many years of de facto association with the Institute of Archaeology, in 2000 it was jointly brought under the single departmental umbrella of School of Archaeology.

The laboratory includes the Oxford Radiocarbon Accelerator Unit (ORAU), which carries out radiocarbon dating using an accelerator mass spectrometer. The Laboratory publishes the journal Archaeometry, and hosts a chair named for its first director, Edward Hall Professorship in Archaeological Science, and a seminar series named for Martin Aitkin.

The Laboratory is currently directed by Professor Mark Pollard.

== Areas of Research, Past and Present ==
- Radiocarbon dating
- Luminescence dating
- Materials analysis
- Palaeodiet
- Archaeological geophysics
- Uranium-series dating
- Diagenesis
- Tephrachronology

== History of Directorship ==
- Teddy Hall, 1955–1989.
- Mike Tite, 1989–2004.
- Mark Pollard, 2004–2014.
- Christopher Bronk Ramsey 2014–2019.
- Mark Pollard, 2019–Present.

== Edward Hall Professorship in Archaeological Science ==
In 1989, when Teddy Hall retired, the laboratory was placed in jeopardy. In order for the university to agree to the funding of the Deputy Directorship in 1955, Hall, who was independently wealthy, forfeited his own salary. Knowing that his replacement would require funding, he launched an appeal and raised a million pound endowment for a chair, the now eponymous Edward Hall Professorship in Archaeological Science.

The first to take this chair was a previous student of Martin Aitken's, Mike Tite, who also worked with the pair on dating the Turin Shroud. Tite was Edward Hall Professor from 1989, until his retirement in 2004. He was replaced by Mark Pollard, who remains in post.

== See also ==
- Archaeology
- History of Art
- School of Archaeology, Oxford
