= Paula Reimer =

Earth scientist and scientific archaeologist

Paula Reimer OBE
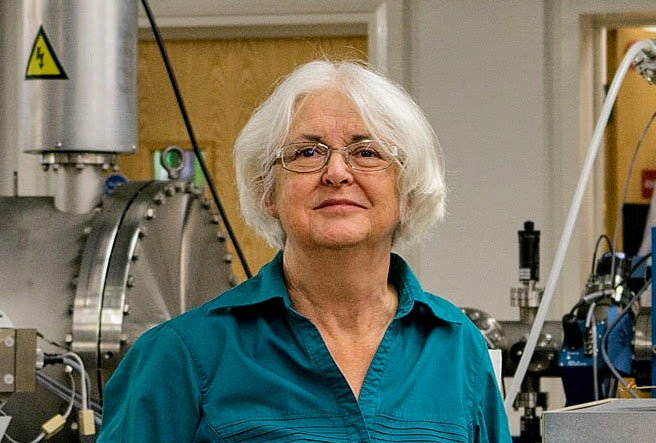
- Other name: Paula Jo Lucas Reimer
- Education: PhD, University of Washington, 1998; MSc, Iowa State University, 1976; BSc, Iowa State University, 1974
- Known for: radiocarbon dating and applications
- Awards: 2013 Lyell Medal (Geological Society of London); 2014 Elected member of Royal Irish Academy; 2021 Pomerance Award for Scientific Contributions to Archaeology; 2021 Archaeologist of the Year; 2022 James Croll Award; 2022 Honorary Officer of the Order of the British Empire (OBE); 2024 Rip Rapp Archaeological Geology Award (GSA)
- Scientific career
- Fields: earth science, radiocarbon dating and calibration, carbon cycling, archaeology
- Workplaces: Queen's University Belfast; University of Washington; Lawrence Livermore National Laboratory
- Thesis: Carbon cycle variations in a Pacific Northwest lake from the late glacial to early Holocene
- Academic advisors: Minze Stuiver

Paula Jo Reimer OBE, MRIA is a radiocarbon and archaeological scientist. Reimer is the former director of the ^{14}Chrono Centre for Climate, the Environment, and Chronology at Queen's University Belfast.

== Biography ==
Reimer has a BSc in Physics (1974) and MSc in Biophysics (1976) from Iowa State University. She was awarded her PhD in Geological Sciences, working with Minze Stuiver, from University of Washington in 1998. She worked at the Quaternary Isotope Lab at Washington from 1977 to 1998, after which she moved to Queen's University Belfast for a Postdoctoral fellowship in 1998–2001. This was followed by a second postdoctoral fellowship at the Lawrence Livermore National Laboratory from 2001 to 2004. In 2004, she became director of the ^{14}Chrono Centre at Queen's until her retirement in 2023.

Paula's research has focussed around improving radiocarbon dating and calibration, with a particular focus on understanding carbon cycling and radiocarbon reservoirs. Alongside Minze Stuiver, she developed the first internationally-agreed radiocarbon age calibration curve (IntCal98) and provided the first freely-available software package (CALIB) to calibrate radiocarbon dates. From 2002-2020, Paula chaired the International Radiocarbon Calibration (INTCAL) Working Group. INTCAL provide (regular-updated) internationally-agreed radiocarbon calibration curves for the Northern and Southern Hemispheric Atmosphere (denoted IntCalXX and SHCalXX), and the global surface oceans (MarineXX), where XX denotes the year in which the update was provided. These calibration curves enable consistent and comparable radiocarbon dating across the life and environmental sciences. During Paula's tenure as chair, she oversaw the production of IntCal04, IntCal09, IntCal13, and IntCal20. The advances provided by these curves have extended radiocarbon calibration to the technique's limit 55,000 years ago.

=== Awards ===
Reimer was awarded the Lyell Medal from The Geological Society in 2013. She was elected to the Royal Irish Academy in 2014. In December 2020, Reimer was voted the 2021 'Archaeologist of the Year' in the annual Current Archaeology awards. In 2021 Reimer was the recipient of the Pomerance Award for Scientific Contributions to Archaeology from the Archaeological Institute of America in recognition of her "distinguished record of contributions to the advancement of archaeological science". Reimer was the recipient of the James Croll Medal from the Quaternary Research Association in January 2022.

In July 2022, she was appointed as Honorary Officer of the Order of the British Empire (OBE), for "services to Radiocarbon Dating, Calibration and Chronology". In 2024, Paula was awarded the Rip Rapp Archaeological Geology Award of The Geological Society of America for outstanding contributions to the interdisciplinary field of archaeological geology.

== Selected (key) publications ==
A full list of Reimer's publications can be found here.

- Reimer P.J., Austin W.E.N., Bard E., Bayliss A., Blackwell P.G., Bronk Ramsey C., Butzin M., Cheng H., Edwards R.L., Friedrich M., Grootes P.M., Guilderson T.P., Hajdas I., Heaton T.J., Hogg A.G., Hughen K.A., Kromer B., Manning S.W., Muscheler R., Palmer J.G., Pearson C., van der Plicht J., Reimer R.W., Richards D.A., Scott E.M., Southon J.R., Turney C.S.M, Wacker L., Adolphi F., Büntgen U., Capano M., Fahrni S.M., Fogtmann-Schulz A., Friedrich R., Köhler P., Kudsk S., Miyake F., Olsen J., Reinig F., Sakamoto M., Sookdeo A., Talamo S. 2020. "The IntCal20 Northern Hemisphere Radiocarbon Age Calibration Curve (0–55 cal kBP)". Radiocarbon doi:10.1017/RDC.2020.41
- Reimer PJ et al. 2013. IntCal13 and Marine13 radiocarbon age calibration curves 0–50,000 years cal BP. Radiocarbon 55(4):1869–1887 doi:10.2458/azu_js_rc.55.16947
- Reimer PJ et al. 2009. IntCal09 and Marine09 radiocarbon age calibration curves, 0–50,000 years cal BP. Radiocarbon 51(4):1111–50 doi:10.1017/S0033822200034202
- Reimer PJ et al. 2004 IntCal04 terrestrial radiocarbon age calibration, 0-26 cal kyr BP. Radiocarbon 46(3):1029–1058 doi:10.1017/S0033822200032999
- Stuiver M and Reimer PJ 1993 Extended 14C Data Base and Revised CALIB 3.0 14C Age Calibration Program Radiocarbon 35(1):215–230 doi:10.1017/S0033822200013904
- Stuiver M, Reimer PJ et al. 1998 INTCAL98 Radiocarbon Age Calibration, 24,000–0 cal BP. Radiocarbon 40(3):1041–1083 doi:10.1017/S0033822200019123
- Heaton TJ et al. Radiocarbon: A key tracer for studying Earth's dynamo, climate system, carbon cycle, and Sun Science (invited review) doi:10.1126/science.abd7096
