= Boar Vessel =

Terracotta vessel and internet meme

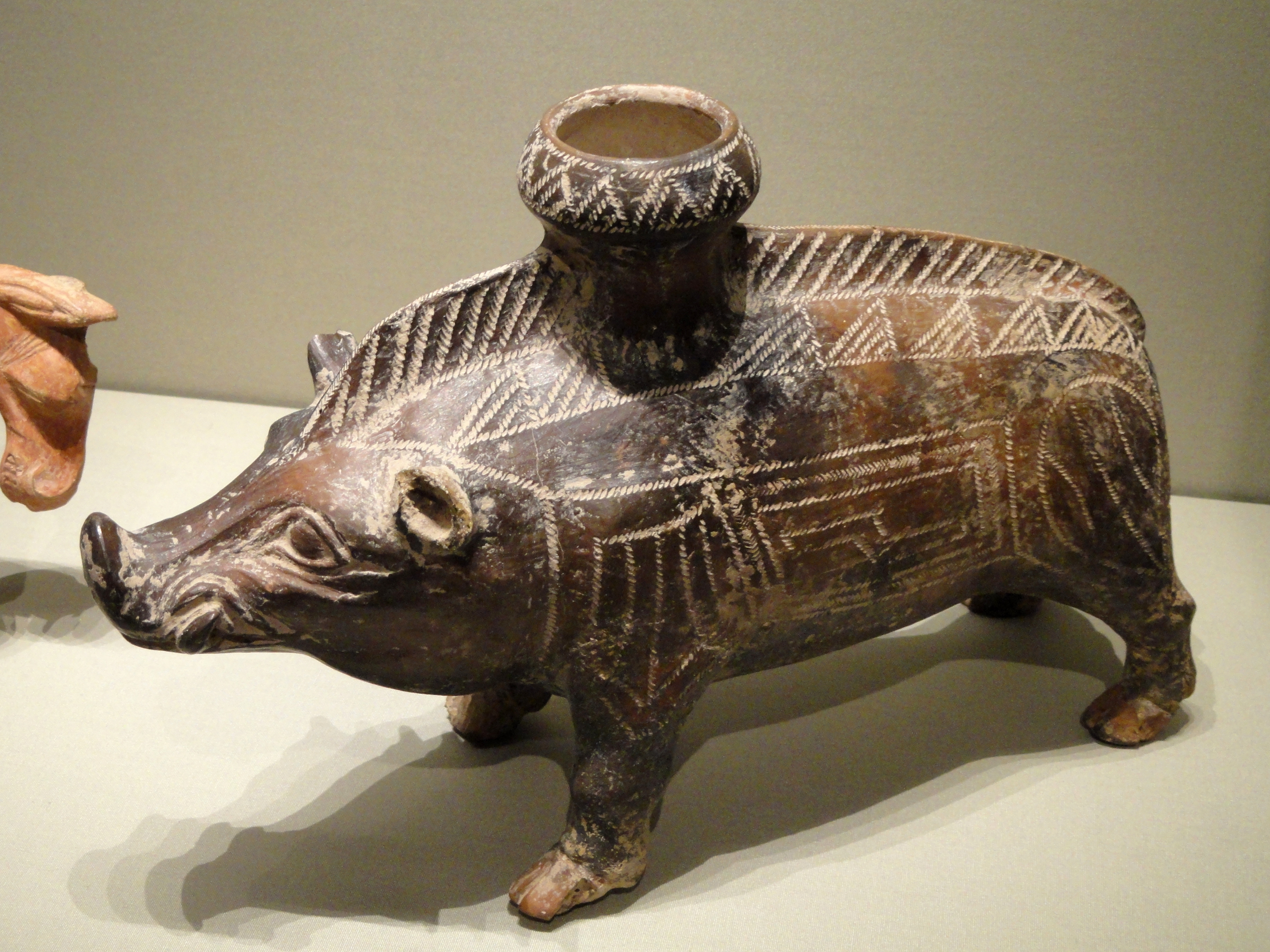
The Etruscan Boar on display at the Cleveland Museum of Art

Boar Vessel, 600-500 BC Etruscan Ceramic is an internet meme that became popular in 2016. The vessel from The Cleveland Museum of Art became a meme in 2015, when a Facebook user on the page Edifying Etruscan memes captioned the image with a conversation of a girl saying “I only date Boar Vessel 600-500 BC Etruscan Ceramic”. The subreddit /r/BoarVesselMemes was subsequently launched on June 17, 2018. Many of the memes play on the absurdity of the ancient boar as an object of desire.

== Controversy ==
In 2018, The Cleveland Museum of Art began to investigate the boar for forgery due to its widespread popularity. Seth Pevnick the Curator of Greek and Roman Art at The Cleveland Museum revealed in his investigations with the Conservator of Objects, Colleen Synder that the thermoluminescence testing dated the vessel to the 20th century, rather than 600-500BC. The description on The Cleveland Museum’s website now states that the vessel could be from 700-500 BCE or the 1900s as there is a chance that the vessel could have been exposed to high temperatures a hundred years ago that may have influenced its thermoluminescence testing, though most archaeologists agree that the vessel is most likely modern forgery.
