= Elizabeth Ralph =

Elizabeth Ralph may refer to:

- Elizabeth K. Ralph, American pioneer in radiocarbon dating, and field hockey player
- Elizabeth Ralph (archivist), British archivist and historian
