= Zeder (surname) =

Zeder is a surname. Notable people with the surname include:

- Frederick Morrell Zeder (1886–1951), American scientist and engineer
- Melinda A. Zeder (fl. 1978), American archaeologist
