= Three-phase firing =

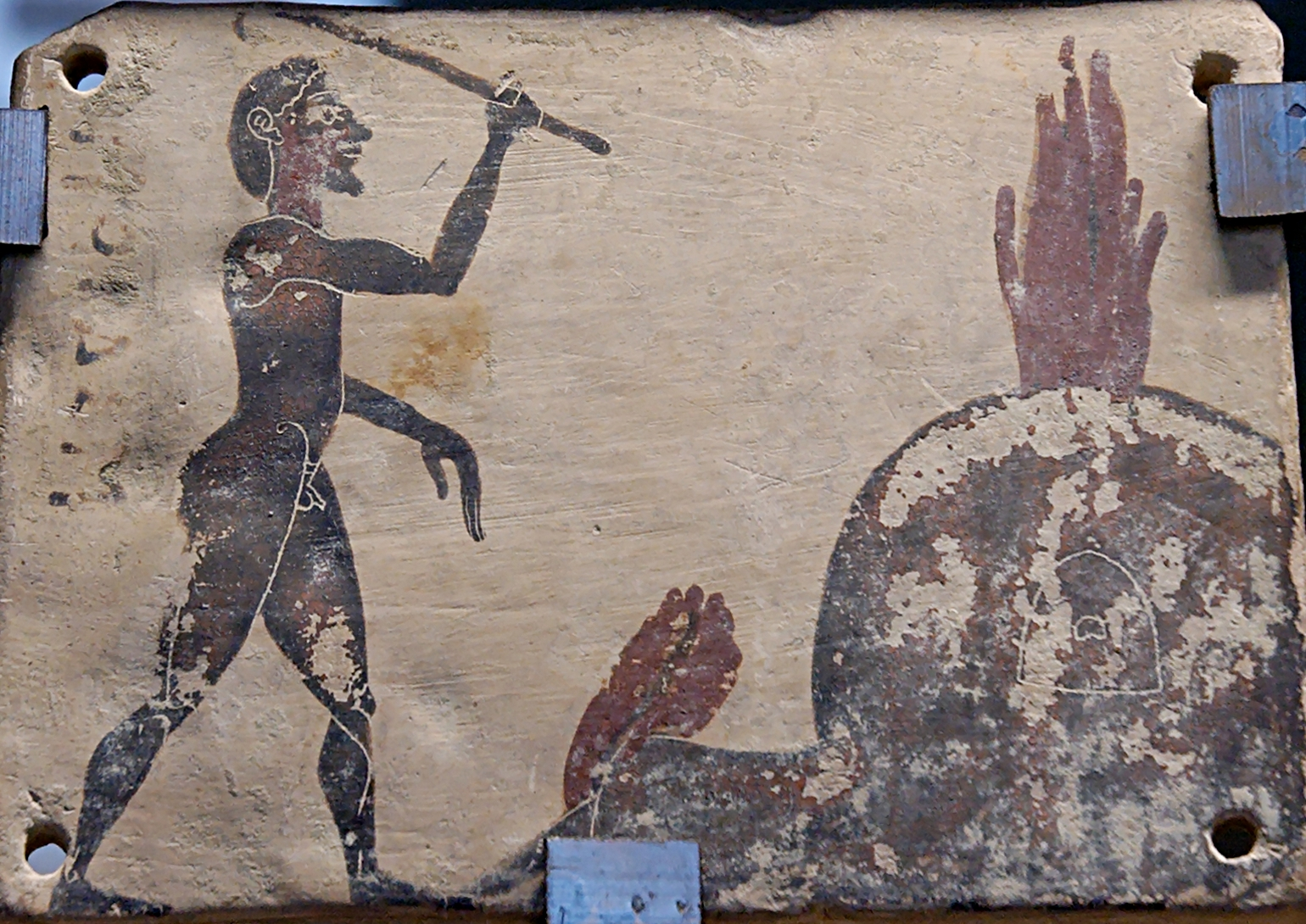
Kiln with opening and viewing hole, perhaps a depiction of the second or reducing phase: the surplus of CO leads to jets of flame from stoking hole and vent (Corinthian pinax, ca. 575–550 BC)

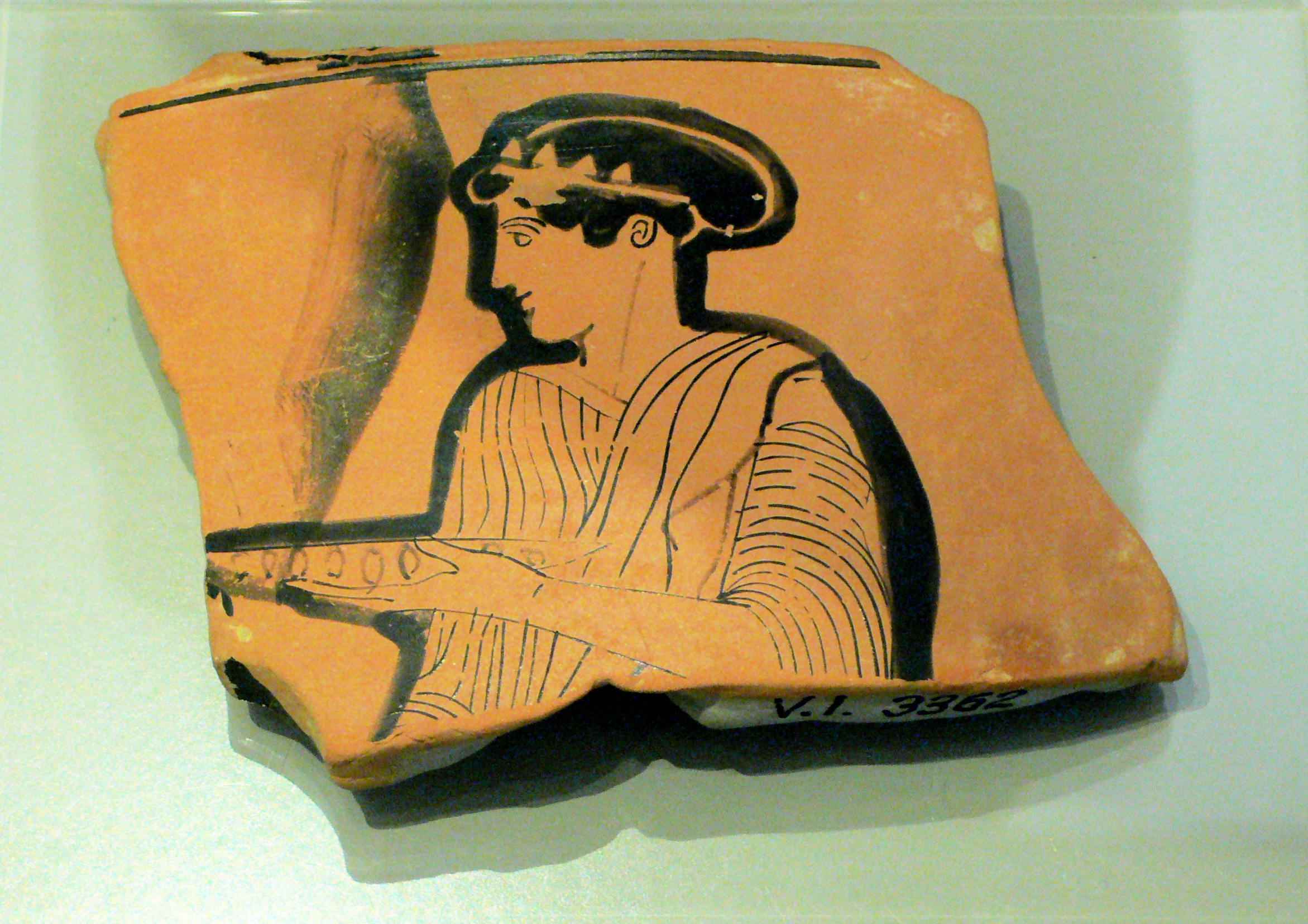
Fragment of an Attic red-figure vase, probably broken during painting and then used as test piece to check for full reduction

Three-phase firing (or three-step firing) or iron reduction technique is a firing technique used in ancient Greek pottery production, specifically for painted vases. Already vessels from the Bronze Age feature the colouring typical of the technique, with yellow, orange or red clay and brown or red decoration. By the 7th century BC, the process was perfected in mainland Greece (Corinth and Athens) enabling the production of extremely shiny black-slipped surfaces, which led to the development of the black-figure and red-figure techniques, which dominated Greek vase painting until about 300 BC.

The conventional view, developed in modern times in view of a lack of contemporary accounts, was that painted Greek pottery received a single firing, after the shaped pot had been dried leather-hard and then painted. But the firing had three phases, designed to create the intended colours. Sometimes further painting in other colours was added after firing, especially in white-ground and Hellenistic vases. However, new studies instead provide material evidence that the pottery was made with two or more separate firings in which the pottery is subjected to multiple firing stages. The conventional view is described in more detail below, but the possibility of different firings for the phases described should be kept in mind.

== Stages of iron oxidation ==
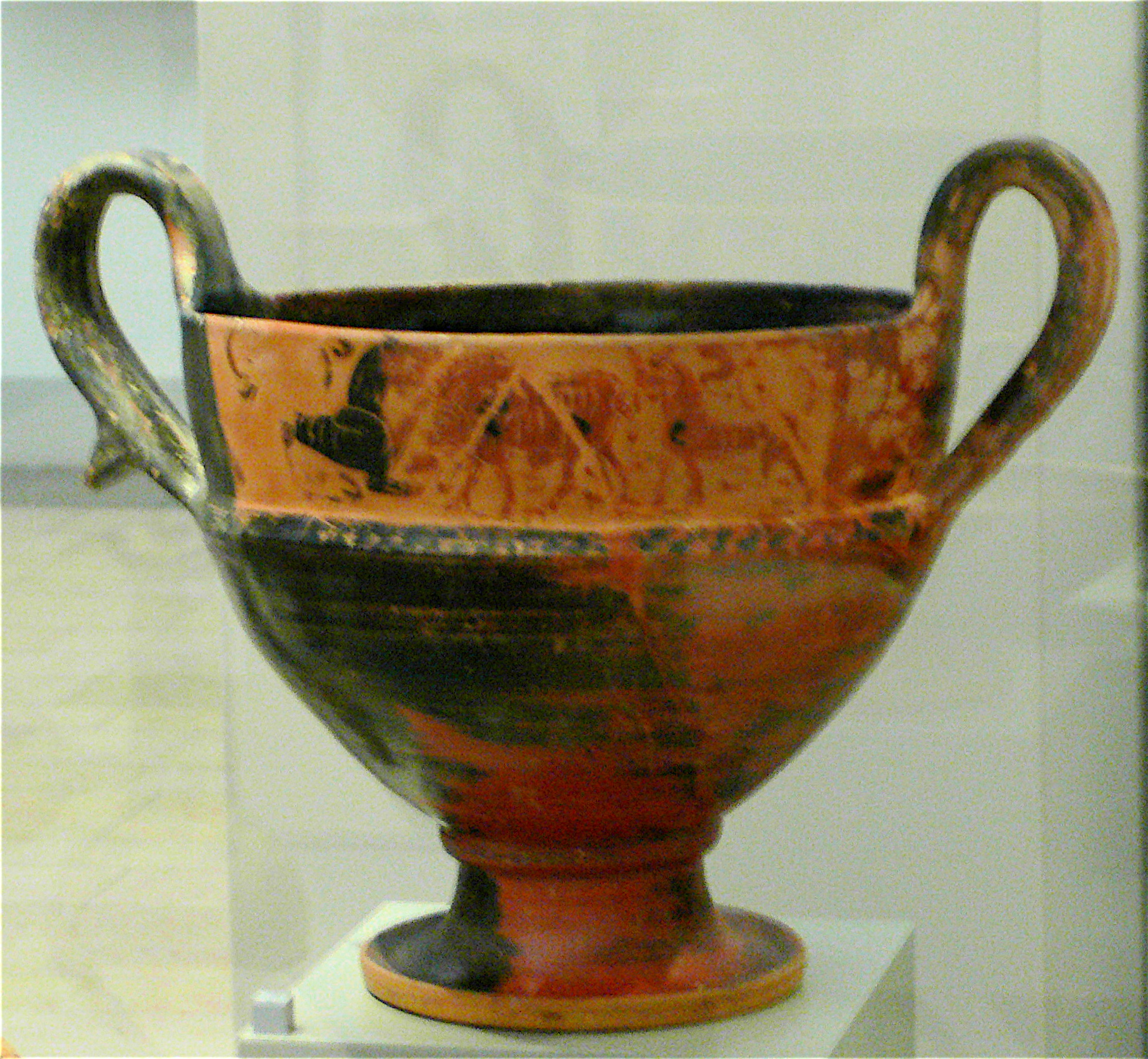
A misfired black-figure vessel, with reduction satisfactory only in the left part: the area on the right either reduced insufficiently or reoxidised due to insufficient sealing, perhaps as a result of uneven temperature distribution or bad circulation of reducing gases in the kiln.

All colours of Greek black-red vase painting are produced by the different concentrations of iron in the clay, and the different degrees to which that iron is oxidised during firing. Iron has the special feature of forming oxides of various colours, including grey Iron(II) oxide (FeO), red Iron(III) oxide (Fe_{2}O_{3}), and deep black magnetite (Fe_{3}O_{4}). Which of these types of oxidation is achieved depends on the availability of oxygen and the temperature of the reactive mix: a high oxygen content encourages the production of Fe_{2}O_{3}, while a lack of it tends to lead to the creation of FeO or Fe_{3}O_{4}. Thus, the colour of iron-rich clays can be influenced by controlling the atmosphere during firing, aiming for it to be either "reducing" (i.e. poor in oxygen and rich in carbon) or "oxidising" (i.e. rich in oxygen). This control is the essence of three-phase firing.

== Vitrification and sintering ==
To achieve more than one colour on a given vase, a further trick is necessary: The black magnetite Fe_{3}O_{4} has to be prevented from returning to matte red hematite Fe_{2}O_{3}. In other words, the areas to remain black have to be denied access to oxygen, their oxidised particles must be "sealed". This is achieved by using a further property of the clay: the vitrification point, i.e. the temperature at which the individual clay particles irreversibly merge, depends on the composition of the clay and on the particles contained in it.

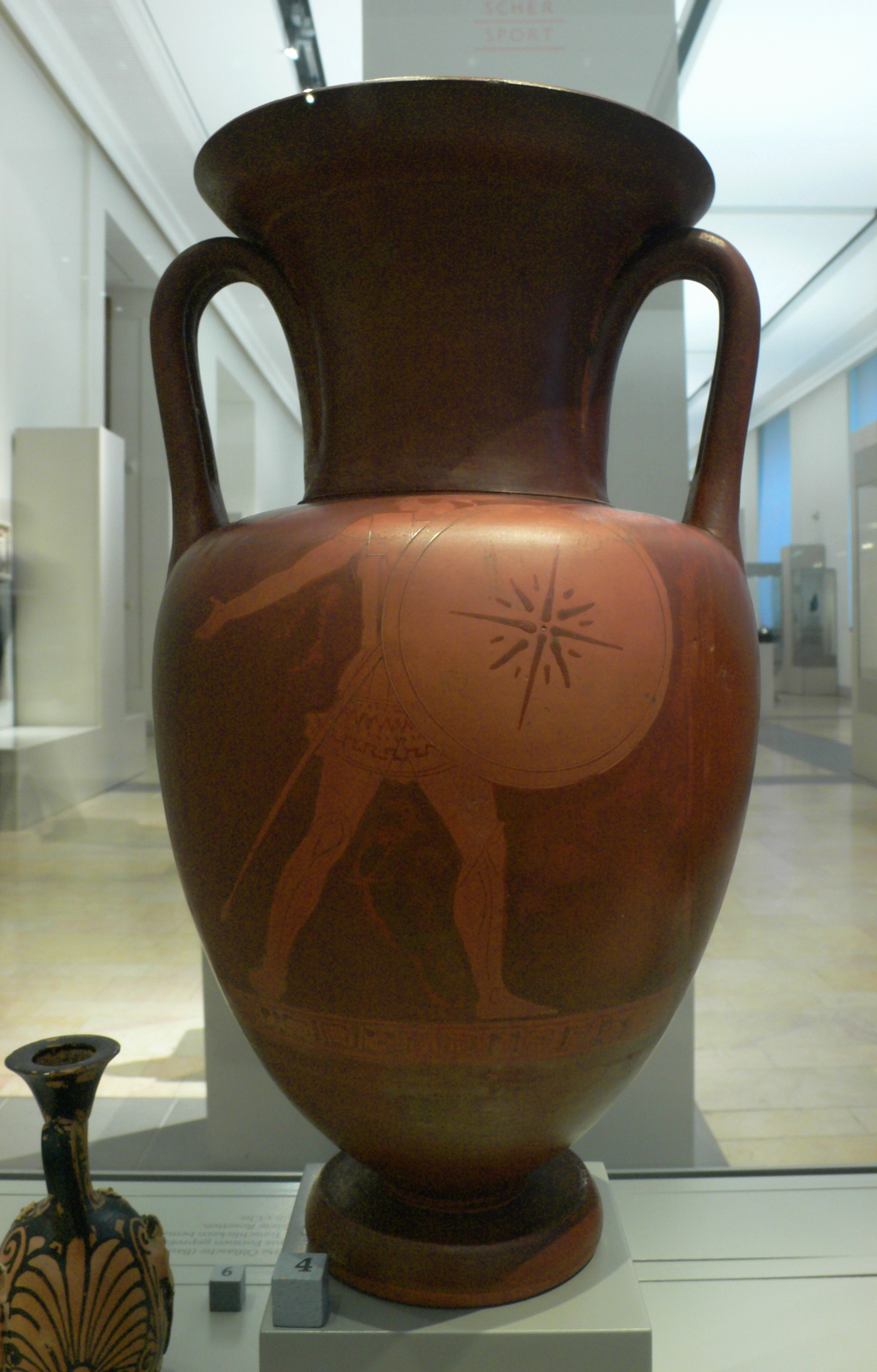
A misfired red-figure vessel: insufficient reduction or too-low firing temperature caused slip to seal insufficiently and thus reoxidise (return to red), in 3rd phase; compare (at bottom left) vase with "correct" black.

Smaller clay particles and a high calcium content lower the sintering point. The production of finely varied painting slips was achieved through levigation and the subsequent scooping off of various layer. The addition of "peptising" substances (i.e. substances that break up and separate the clay particles and prevent them from coagulating again) can further reduce particle size. Such substances include caustic soda (NaOH), ammonia (NH_{3}), potash (K_{2}CO_{3}) and polyphosphates such as calgon (NaPO_{3})_{6}: these attach themselves to the clay particles with strong hydrogen bonds and thus prevent them, in a similar way to surfactants, from rejoining and coagulating again. In other words, the clay particles are now in a state of colloid suspension.

== Kiln control ==
A precondition for three-phase firing was a controllable kiln. Apparently, the necessary technology was developed in Corinth in the 7th century BC. Only the domed kilns with vent openings invented then allowed the production of black-figure, and subsequently of red-figure pottery. The control of temperature could be assured visually by using a viewing hole, or through placing test pieces in the oven.

== Firing ==
Before firing, the clay vessels were densely stacked in the kiln. Since Attic pottery contains no glazes proper (i.e. ones that melt and vitrify completely), vessels could touch in the kiln. However, it was of major importance to achieve a good circulation of air/gas, so as to prevent misfiring.

=== Phase 1: Kindling (oxidising) ===
Typical firing probably took place at a temperature of 850–975 °C (1,562–1,787 °F). With constant firing of the kiln, such temperatures were reached after about 8 to 9 hours. During this process, the vessels in the oven initially lost whatever moisture remained in them. At a temperature of 500 °C (932 °F), after 6 or 7 hours, true firing of the now red-hot vessels began. With a constant supply of oxygen and a still increasing temperature, the iron-rich shiny slip oxidised and turned red, along with the rest of the vessel. During this process, the iron content is transformed into deep red hematite (Fe_{2}O_{3}). It is not necessary but highly likely that this kindling phase took place in an oxidising atmosphere: an oxygen-rich fire is likely in any case, since it is much more effective in producing heat. Further, the fact that reducing fires are extremely smoky would probably have been considered undesirable, and they were thus limited to the relatively short 2nd phase.

=== Phase 2: Reduction (vitrification of the shiny slip) ===
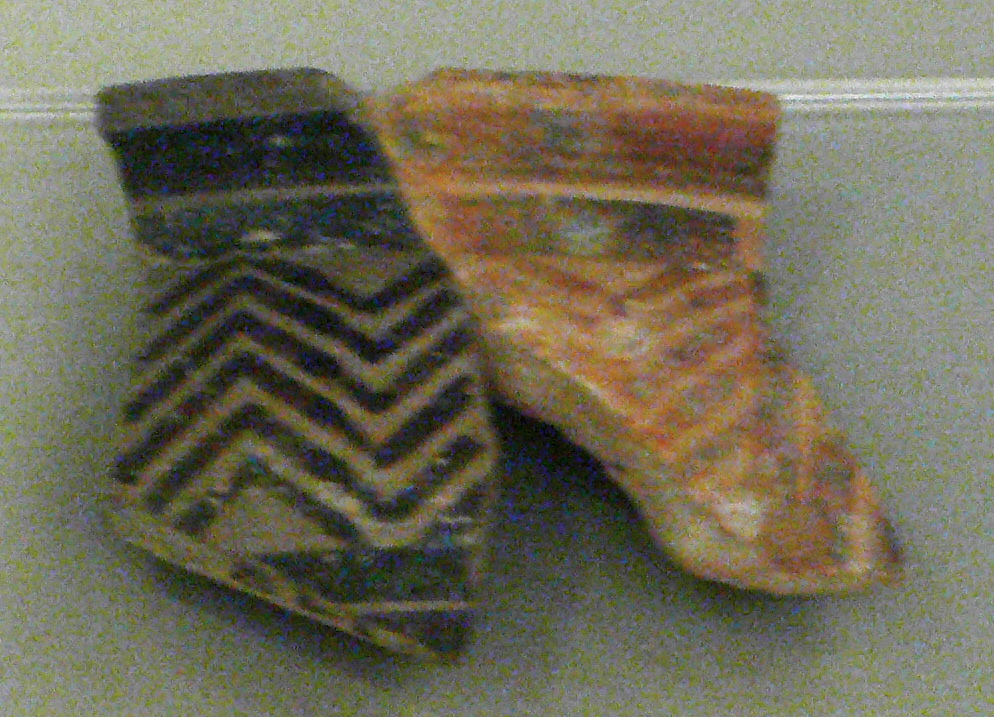
Joining sherds that are oxidised to different degrees, from the Areopagus; probably used as test pieces to check whether full reduction was achieved (left fully reduced; right insufficient)

At about 900 °C (1,650 °F), the oxygen supply is cut, creating reducing conditions, so that red hematite Fe_{2}O_{3} turns to matte-black iron oxide FeO, and the black slip turns to deep black magnetite Fe_{3}O_{4}. In antiquity this could be achieved through closing the air supply openings and adding non-dried brushwood and green wood, which would only burn incompletely, producing carbon monoxide (CO rather than CO_{2}). The temperature was held for some time, probably at about 945 °C (1,733 °F), to assure a complete melting and sintering of the fine-particled paint slip. Subsequently, the temperature sank below the sintering (vitrification) point of the painted slip again, while still in a reducing atmosphere. Now, the slip is "sealed" and permits no further oxygen to react with its contents, so that the magnetite Fe_{3}O_{4}-oxides within it retain their black colour.

=== Phase 3: Reoxidation and cooling ===
During the final phase of firing, the aeration openings of the kiln are reopened: oxidising conditions are restored. Those areas of the vessels that were not sealed in phase 2 now reoxidise: black iron oxide FeO turns back into red hematite Fe_{2}O_{3}. After complete oxidation of the red areas, the kiln could be opened, its contents were then permitted to cool down slowly, and eventually removed.

== Bibliography ==
- Marie Farnsworth: Draw Pieces as Aids to Correct Firing. In: AJA 64 (1960), p. 72-75, pl. 16.
- U. Hofmann: The Chemical Basis of Ancient Greek Vase Painting. In: Angewandte Chemie 1 (1962), p. 341-350.
- Lisa C. Kahn and John C. Wissinger: "Re-creating and Firing a Greek Kiln." In: Papers on Special Techniques in Athenian Vases: Proceedings of a Symposium Held in Conjunction with the Exhibition The Colors of Clay. Ed. Kenneth D.S. Lapatin. Getty 2007.
- Joseph Veach Noble: The Technique of Attic Vase Painting. In: AJA 63 (1960).
- Joseph Veach Noble: The Techniques of Painted Attic Pottery. New York 1965.
- Ingeborg Scheibler: Griechische Töpferkunst. Herstellung, Handel und Gebrauch antiker Tongefäße. Ch. Beck, 2., rev. Edn.., Munich 1995. ISBN 3-406-39307-1
- Theodor Schumann: Oberflächenverzierung in der antiken Töpferkunst. Terra sigillata und griechische Schwarzrotmalerei. In: Berichte der deutschen keramischen Gesellschaft 32 (1942), p. 408-426.
- Adam Winter: Die Technik des griechischen Töpfers in ihren Grundlagen. In: Technische Beiträge zur Archäologie, Vol 1. Mainz (1959).
- Adam Winter, Roland Hampe: Bei Töpfern und Töpferinnen in Kreta, Messenien und Zypern. Mainz (1962).
