= Tamsin O'Connell =

Archaeological scientist

Academic background
- Education: University of Oxford
- Thesis: The isotopic relationship between diet and body proteins : implications for the study of diet in archaeology

Academic work
- Institutions: University of Cambridge

Tamsin O'Connell is an archaeological scientist based at the University of Cambridge. Her work has pioneered the use of isotope analysis in archaeology, specifically diet and climate in human and animal tissues.

== Education ==
O'Connell studied chemistry at the University of Oxford. She began to work with Robert Hedges at the Research Laboratory for Archaeology and the History of Art in Oxford initially during her undergraduate dissertation followed by a DPhil funded by SERC/NERC. Her thesis was titled 'The isotopic relationship between diet and body proteins : implications for the study of diet in archaeology', completed in 1996.

== Career ==
O'Connell held a Wellcome Trust Post-doctoral Fellowship, and then two post-doctoral positions at the RLAHA. She joined the University of Cambridge in 2004, with a Wellcome Trust University Award, to set up an isotope and palaeodiet laboratory, now called the Dorothy Garrod Laboratory.

In 2019 she was appointed as a Reader in Isotopic Ecology. O'Connell is a Fellow in Bioarchaeology and Director of Studies in Archaeology at Trinity Hall.

She has supervised Phd students in isotopic archaeology, including Amy Prendergast, Suzanne Pilaar-Birch, and Emma Lightfoot.

== Research ==
O'Connell has collaborated widely with archaeologists across time periods, including Roman Italy. O'Connell has also worked with ecological and epidemiological case studies.

== Selected publications ==
- O'Connell TC, Hedges RE (April 1999). "Investigations into the effect of diet on modern human hair isotopic values". American Journal of Physical Anthropology. 108 (4): 409–25. doi:10.1002/(SICI)1096-8644(199904)108:4<409::AID-AJPA3>3.0.CO;2-E. PMID 10229386.
- O'Connell TC, Hedges RE, Healey MA, Simpson AH (November 2001). "Isotopic comparison of hair, nail and bone: modern analyses". Journal of Archaeological Science. 28 (11): 1247–55. Bibcode:2001JArSc..28.1247O. doi:10.1006/jasc.2001.0698.
- O'Connell TC, Kneale CJ, Tasevska N, Kuhnle GG (November 2012). "The diet-body offset in human nitrogen isotopic values: a controlled dietary study". American Journal of Physical Anthropology. 149 (3): 426–34. doi:10.1002/ajpa.22140. PMC 3483624. PMID 23042579.
- Lightfoot E, O'Connell TC (2016). "On the Use of Biomineral Oxygen Isotope Data to Identify Human Migrants in the Archaeological Record: Intra-Sample Variation, Statistical Methods and Geographical Considerations". PLOS ONE. 11 (4) e0153850. Bibcode:2016PLoSO..1153850L. doi:10.1371/journal.pone.0153850. PMC 4849641. PMID 27124001.
- O'Connell TC (June 2017). "'Trophic' and 'source' amino acids in trophic estimation: a likely metabolic explanation". Oecologia. 184 (2): 317–326. Bibcode:2017Oecol.184..317O. doi:10.1007/s00442-017-3881-9. PMC 5487837. PMID 28584941.
