= Rehydroxylation dating =

Method for dating fired-clay ceramics

Rehydroxylation (RHX) dating is a developing method for dating fired-clay ceramics. This new concept relies on a key property of ceramic materials, in which they expand and gain mass over time. After a ceramic specimen is removed from the kiln at the time of production, it immediately begins to recombine chemically with moisture from the environment. This reaction reincorporates hydroxyl (OH) groups into the ceramic material, and is described as rehydroxylation. The phenomenon has been well-documented over the past one hundred years (albeit more focused on limited timescales), and has now been proposed as a means to date fired-clay ceramics. The RHX process produces an increase in specimen weight, and this weight increase provides an accurate measure of the extent of rehydroxylation. The dating clock is provided by the experimental finding that the RHX reaction follows a precise kinetic law: the weight gain increases as the fourth root of the time which has elapsed since firing. This power law and the RHX method which follows from it were discovered by scientists from the University of Manchester and the University of Edinburgh.

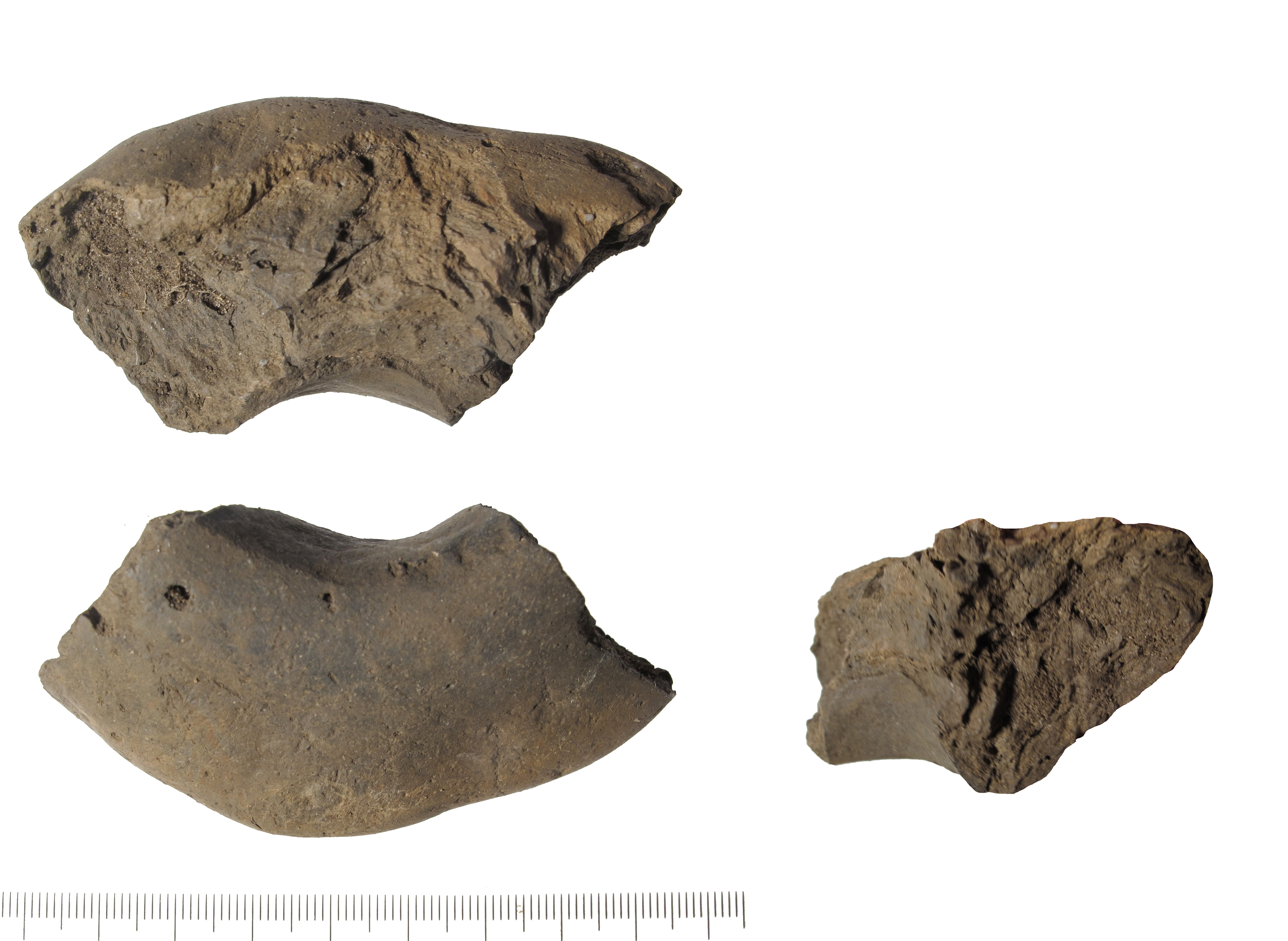
An example of Anglo-Saxon loom-weight fragments

The concept of RHX dating was first stated in 2003 by Wilson and collaborators who noted that the "results … suggest a new method for archaeological dating of ceramics". The RHX method was then described in detail in 2009 for brick and tile materials, and in relation to pottery in 2011. The archaeological pottery first used to test the developing RHX method consisted of three categories for which the dates had already been calculated by other archaeological means. The first was an Anglo-Saxon loom-weight from 560 to 660 AD, a Samian-ware sherd from 45 to 75 AD, and three Werra earthenware sherds from 1605 AD. The types of samples used were deemed important for the experiment since they represented "three specific perceived issues associated with applying the RHX method to excavate archaeological pottery." These issues included potsherds found in waterlogged sites, low-firing-temperature ceramics, vitrified ceramics, and those containing a slip or a glaze.

RHX dating is not yet routinely or commercially available. It is the subject of a number of research and validation studies in several countries.

== Power-law kinetics ==
Percentage mass gain through adsorption of water against time^{1/4} in years.

The concept of clay ceramic expansion, post-firing, has been the object of discussion for a long time, first noted by Schurecht in 1928 to explain crazing in ceramic glazes, and confirmed in 1954 by McBurney that this and the expansion of ceramic bodies is due to the intake of moisture from the environment. Moisture expansion has since been an important property of clay ceramics to consider when using the material, such as clay bricks in construction. In 2003, it was proposed that moisture expansion could extend over much longer periods of time, contrasting with the previous research over more limited time scales. This was evaluated on bricks ranging from the Roman period to modern ones. It was ascertained that moisture expansion follows a power law: mass gain and expansion depend on time^{1/4} across archaeological timescales. For example, if the weight of a fired-clay ceramic increases as a result of RHX by 0.1% in 1 year from firing, then the weight increase is 0.2% in 16 years, 0.3% in 81 years, 0.4% in 256 years, and so on. The reason behind this quartic root dependence is uncertain; however, further research is being conducted to explain why, including NMR and IR spectroscopy. Despite the uncertainty, enough previous research and other more recent data have indicated that the law is valid, with moisture expansion and weight gain being proportional to each other for a specified material at any specified firing temperature.

The basis of RHX dating depends on this power law.

== Dating methodology ==
First, a small sample of the material is obtained. To do so, the ceramic artifact is wet-cut using a water-cooled saw to avoid producing heat and consequently causing some dehydroxylation. After this, any loose debris must be removed; this can be done by thoroughly cleaning it under running water. The sample is then heated to 105 °C until constant weight to remove all capillary water and loosely adsorbed water. Next, the sample is conditioned in a controlled environment to the estimated effective lifetime temperature (ELT) and relative humidity to obtain the RHX constant (α). The ELT is generally close to (but not exactly the same as) the long-term annual mean surface air temperature. Finally, to completely remove all the water gained in the previous stage, the sample is heated to 500 °C for 4 hours until constant weight, which indicates that all the water has been lost and, therefore, has hypothetically returned to its original historical mass after removal from the kiln.

After the preparation of the sample is complete, it is transferred to a microbalance chamber and exposed to water vapour at a controlled temperature (identical to the first ELT) and relative humidity to determine the kinetics of the mass gain through recombination with water. Once this process has been carried out for the desired length of time (on average one to two days), the mass data are recorded.

Once the RHX rate is determined, it is possible to calculate how long ago it was removed from the kiln, and therefore assign a date to the material.

To determine the date of the material, the rate of the mass gain needs to be calculated using the following equation:

$y = \alpha \cdot T \cdot t^{1/4},$

where $\alpha$ is the mass gain rate constant, $T$ is temperature (the ELT), and $t$ is time. The older the sample, the greater the mass gained from combining chemically with water, since the initial mass of the sample is equal to the sum of that of the original fired material and the water combined with it over its lifetime. From there, using other data obtained, the age is calculated using:

$t_\alpha = \left( \frac{m_\alpha}{\alpha m_4} \right)^{4},$

where $t_\alpha$ is the time elapsed since the last historical firing (age of material), $m_\alpha$ is the mass of hydroxyl groups, $m_4$ is the hypothetical mass at complete dehydroxylation, and $\alpha$ represents the rate constant. To ensure the date is accurate, either multiple samples from the same artefact can be taken and analysed, or the sample can be dated again using an alternative means and the results compared.

== Technical issues ==
When developing the method, it was important to understand whether variations in humidity affect the RHX mass-gain rate of the ceramic material. Little research had yet examined this in-depth. Therefore, a study was carried out on samples from the 19th and 20th centuries, in which they dehydrated the samples to remove any physically and chemically bonded water and placed them in conditions which were varied between dry and humid extremes. The conclusion was that variations in humidity do not affect the kinetics of RHX since it only affects the physically bonded water content, rather than the chemically bonded hydroxyl ions. This is because the RHX reaction occurs extremely slowly, and only minute amounts of water are required to feed it, with sufficient water being available in virtually all terrestrial environments. Neither systematic nor transient changes in humidity have an effect on long-term rehydroxylation kinetics. However, they do affect instantaneous gravimetric measurements or introduce systematic errors, for example through capillary condensation.

Changes in temperature can strongly affect the rate of RHX, and this may impact the calculated age of the ceramic. To illustrate this, the hypothetical example of a 1000-year-old sample is used. During the first 500 years, the ambient temperature remains at 10 °C; for the following 500 years, the temperature increases to 15 °C. Therefore, after the first 500 years, the rate of RHX increases. The mass of the material also begins to increase at a faster rate than previously. Thus, when calculating dates, scientists must be able to estimate the temperature history of the sample. The method of calculation is based on temperature data for the location, with adjustments for burial depth and long-term temperature variation from historical records, such as seasonal and climatic changes. This information is used to estimate an effective lifetime temperature or ELT which is then used in the dating calculation. Recognition of the effects of changes in temperature is vital since reheating the material to a high-enough temperature causes the ceramic to lose some or all of the water gained since the original firing, thus affecting the age calculated. For example, a medieval brick examined by Wilson and her colleagues produced a date of 66 years, instead of the expected earlier date. Closer analysis revealed that the exterior of the brick contained vitrified elements, indicating that it had been exposed to extreme heat since the original time of firing. This was due to the brick having been dehydroxylated by the intense heat of incendiary bombing and fires during World War II. To avoid this type of error or confirm the calculated date, archaeological methods can be used alongside RHX dating, such as stratigraphic dating, radiocarbon dating, or other archaeological methods.

The main application of the RHX technique is to date archaeological ceramics. Yet most archaeological material contains components which cause either additional mass gain or additional mass loss during the RHX measurement process. These components can be an intrinsic part of the object, such as materials added as temper, or compounds which have become incorporated into the object during use, such as organic residues, or other elements which have entered into the object during burial or conservation. Removing the contaminants without affecting the RHX technique is currently being researched. The method deemed the most effective out of the others tested consisted of an acid-base treatment, using hydrochloric acid (HCl) to clean the samples, followed by a solution of hydrogen peroxide (H_{2}O_{2}) to oxidise them. Since RHX dating has yet to become a key part of dating ceramic artefacts due to its very recent development, the residues on the outside/inside of the ceramic can be dated using other methods, including radiocarbon, thermoluminescence, optically stimulated luminescence, and electron paramagnetic resonance.

== Research and application of the method ==
The RHX technique was the product of a three-year study by a collaboration of University of Manchester and University of Edinburgh researchers, led by Moira Wilson. Though it has only been established on bricks and tiles of up to 2,000 years of age, research is continuing to determine whether RHX can be accurately used on any fired-clay material, for example earthenware of up to 10,000 years of age. This is because the mass gain only approximates a 1–2% increase of the original mass of the material over the course of a few millennia. The potential capacity for further adsorption of water could extend to 10,000 years, since the kinetic power law on which the method relies remains true for large time scales. Since the method remains under refinement, it is not yet a standard means of dating archaeological ceramics.

The original work of Wilson and co-workers was undertaken on construction materials, bricks and tiles. Transferring the method to ceramics has brought additional challenges but initial results have demonstrated that ceramics have the same "internal clock" as bricks. Several other studies have attempted to replicate the RHX technique, but using archaeological ceramics. These studies have encountered issues with components within the ceramics, including the mineralogy or the temper added to the clay, causing either additional mass gain or additional mass loss during the RHX measurement process. The quality of data generated by the Manchester and Edinburgh groups has been due to analysing fired-clay materials which do not contain these components. Efforts to successfully replicate the original work and overcome the challenges presented by archaeological ceramics are underway in several academic institutions worldwide.

One example of this research is a study from 2011 that was conducted on shards of 19th-century Davenport ceramics excavated in Utah, USA, to assess the validity of the original method, specifically the rate equation. The study confirmed that RHX dating is applicable to archaeological ceramics, with Bowen and his colleagues stating "the development of a refined expression for rehydration/RHX behaviour would allow a dramatic enhancement of the anthropological research questions currently being posed". In spite of the success, they stressed that knowledge of the mineralogy of the sample is vital. They noted that some minerals, such as illite, undergo dehydration and dehydroxylation reversibly; others, such as kaolinite, undergo this at varying temperatures since they vitrify. Therefore, in order to dehydrate the sample effectively, a suitable temperature needs to be chosen to avoid compromising the integrity of the sample components. It was also concluded that more research needed to be carried out to further examine the effects of mineralogy on RHX dating.

A more recent analysis from 2017 on potsherds from southern Apulia, Italy, proved the potential for the RHX method to become a reliable "alternative or ancillary" means of dating ceramics. The samples used were fragments of Byzantine pottery which had been dated previously by association with other artefacts using radiocarbon analysis. Meanwhile, it was noted that since RHX dating has not been tested sufficiently, it cannot yet replace more conventional ways of dating pottery, such as radiocarbon which has extensive proof of accuracy. The ages calculated for the Byzantine sherds through RHX dating were concurrent with the known ones. The study also emphasized the possible value of this method in refining chronological pottery seriation in cases where the pottery style remains similar over extended periods of time in a specific region, such as the Byzantine vessels examined.

Currently used for archaeology, research continues to allow for RHX dating to be used in more general studies.
