= T. Douglas Price =

American archaeologist (born 1945)

- Born: January 11, 1945 (age 81); New Haven, Connecticut, United States
- Education: University of Michigan
- Known for: Pioneering research in archaeological science
- Scientific career
- Fields: Archaeology
- Workplaces: University of Wisconsin–Madison

Theron Douglas Price (born November 1, 1945) is an American archaeologist who is the Weinstein Emeritus Professor of European Archaeology at the University of Wisconsin–Madison. He is well known as an authority on prehistoric Northern Europe and for his pioneering research in the field of archaeological science.

== Biography ==
T. Douglas Price was born in New Haven, Connecticut on November 1, 1945. He entered the University of Michigan as a freshman in 1963, received his PhD from the Museum of Anthropological Archaeology at the University of Michigan in 1975. Price subsequently reached the position of Chairman and Weinstein Emeritus Professor of European Archaeology at the University of Wisconsin–Madison.

Price is known for his research in on the European Mesolithic, the origins of agriculture and inequality, and archaeological chemistry. During the course of thirty years, he has conducted a number of archaeological investigations to determine this question. He has pioneered the use of archaeological chemistry to determine prehistoric mobility. For this purpose he founded the Laboratory for Archaeological Chemistry in 1988. This research has involved in projects in Central America, the North Atlantic, China and Europe. Price is the author of more than 200 articles and 24 books. Price is a known expert on the prehistory of Europe, on which he has written the work Europe before Rome (2012). He has particularly devoted himself to studying the spread of agriculture into Scandinavia, on which he has conducted archaeological investigations and published influential works. His Ancient Scandinavia: An Archaeological History from the First Humans to the Vikings, was published in 2015.

Price served as the 6th Century Chair in Archaeological Science at the University of Aberdeen, and as President of the Society for Archaeological Science. He is a recipient of the Pomerance Award of the American Institute of Archaeology for his extraordinary contributions to archaeological science. In 2018, Price was elected a Member of the National Academy of Sciences.

== Selected works ==
- An Introduction to Archaeological Chemistry, 2010
- The Origins of Agriculture: New Data, New Ideas, 2011
- Images of the Past 8e, 2019
- Europe Before Rome, 2012
- Ancient Scandinavia: An Archaeological History from the First Humans to the Vikings, 2015
- Principles of Archaeology, 2018

== Sources ==
- "T. Douglas Price". Contemporary Authors. Gale. June 18, 2015.
- "T. Douglas Price". The Writers Directory. St. James Press. 2018 – via Gale.
