= Archaeometry (journal) =

- Cover of Vol. 62(6), December 2020
- Discipline: Archaeology
- Language: English
- Edited by: A. Mark Pollard; Ina Reiche; Brandi MacDonald; Gilberto Artioli; Catherine Batt

Publication details
- Former names: Bulletin of the Research Laboratory for Archaeology and the History of Art
- History: 1958–present
- Publisher: Wiley-Blackwell, on behalf of the Research Laboratory for Archaeology and the History of Art, University of Oxford
- Open access: Hybrid
- License: CC BY; CC BY-NC; CC BY-NC-ND

Standard abbreviations
- ISO 4: Archaeometry

Indexing
- CODEN: ARCHAG
- ISSN: 0003-813X (print); 1475-4754 (web)
- LCCN: 75648556
- OCLC no.: 1481830

Links
- Journal homepage

Archaeometry is a peer-reviewed academic journal covering archaeological science, particularly absolute dating methods, artefact studies, quantitative archaeology, remote sensing, conservation science, and environmental archaeology. It is published bimonthly by Wiley-Blackwell, on behalf of the Research Laboratory for Archaeology and the History of Art at the University of Oxford, in association with the Gesellschaft für Naturwissenschaftliche Archäologie Archäometrie and the Society for Archaeological Sciences. Its current editors are A. Mark Pollard, Ina Reiche, Brandi MacDonald, Gilberto Artioli, and Catherine Batt.

The journal was founded as the Bulletin of the Research Laboratory for Archaeology and the History of Art in 1958. It has been published by Wiley-Blackwell since 2001. Research papers published in Archaeometry are typically "technical expositions of physical and chemical methods applicable to dating and materials identification in archaeology". It is also notable for publishing periodic "datelists", which compile information on radiocarbon dates produced by the Oxford Radiocarbon Accelerator Unit and other radiocarbon laboratories.

== Abstracting and indexing ==
The journal is indexed and abstracted in the Arts and Humanities Citation Index, the Science Citation Index, Scopus, Academic Search, FRANCIS, the International Bibliography of Periodical Literature, the International Bibliography of the Social Sciences, Periodicals Index Online, L'Année philologique, Art Source, Anthropological Literature, and GEOBASE.

According to the Journal Citation Reports, the journal has a 2019 impact factor of 1.519, ranking it 64th out of 86 journals in the category "Chemistry, Analytical", 28th out of 45 in the category "Chemistry, Inorganic & Nuclear", and 142nd out of 200 in the category "Geosciences, Multidisciplinary".

== See also ==
- Radiocarbon (journal)
