= A. Mark Pollard =

British archaeologist and academic

Mark Pollard FSA
- Born: 5 July 1954 (age 72); Takapuna, New Zealand
- Education: University of York
- Known for: Materials analysis in archaeology; Biogeochemical analysis; Statistical applications in archaeology
- Scientific career
- Fields: Archaeological science
- Workplaces: University of York; University of Cardiff; University of Bradford; University of Oxford; Linacre College
- Thesis: X-ray fluorescence and surface studies of glass, with application to the durability of mediaeval window glass (1979)
- Doctoral advisor: G. A. Cox

Alan Mark Pollard FSA (born 5 July 1954) is a British archaeological scientist, who has been the Edward Hall Professor of Archaeological Science at the University of Oxford since 2005. He is director of the Research Laboratory for Archaeology and the History of Art, a Member of the Royal Society of Chemistry, a Fellow of the Society of Antiquaries and a Member of the Oriental Ceramic Society. He has significantly contributed to many areas of archaeological science, most notably materials analysis, with hundreds of well-cited papers.

In 2018 he was awarded the Pomerance Medal for scientific contributions to archaeology by the Archaeological Institute of America.

He has co-authored several key textbooks on archaeological science: Archaeological Chemistry (now in 3rd edition), Handbook of Archaeological Science, and Analytical Chemistry in Archaeology.

Pollard is a Fellow of Linacre College and has been the vice-principal since October 2020.

== Early life ==
Pollard was born in Takapuna, New Zealand, on 5 July 1954 to Alan and Elizabeth Pollard, but emigrated to England at an early age. He completed his BA and PhD degrees at the University of York in the Department of Physics; however, his dissertation was already focusing on archaeological material. Awarded in 1979, it was entitled X-ray fluorescence and surface studies of glass, with application to the durability of mediaeval window glass and used the case study of the glass from York Minster to assess both the analytical problems of surface analysis on vitreous materials, as well as what factors affected their durability.

In 1993, he married fellow archaeologist, Rebecca Nicholson, and the couple have two daughters.

== Academic appointments ==
Immediately upon completing his doctorate in 1978, Pollard was appointed by Edward Thomas Hall as an analytical research officer at the Research Laboratory for the History of Art (RLAHA), where he remained until 1984. After this, he took up the appointment of 'New Blood' Lecturer in Chemistry and Archaeology, within the Schools of Chemistry and Applied Chemistry, at Cardiff University. In 1988, he was appointed UK national co-ordinator for science-based archaeology, a post supported by SERC, English Heritage (Historic England) and the British Academy, to improve liaison between funding bodies, improve communication flow and encourage the development and take-up of science-based techniques and results in archaeology. He retained this position until 2000.

In 1990, he took up a professorship of archaeological science at the University of Bradford. In this same year, he was appointed head of the Department of Archaeology, replacing Arnold Aspinall.

He remained in Bradford until 2004, during which time a great deal of cutting edge archaeological research was produced in Bradford, and Pollard supervised many students who went on to hold significant positions across academia, including Carl Heron, director of scientific research at the British Museum. In 1999, Pollard was appointed pro-vice chancellor.

In 2004, he returned to the RLAHA to replace the retiring Mike Tite as director, and to take up the chair of Edward Hall Professor of Archaeological Science. Since 2009, he has supervised 14 Oxford doctorates to completion, and co-supervised a further 23. As of January 2022, he has seven doctoral students.

== Other appointments ==
Pollard is a trustee of the Mary Rose Museum since 2019, was the associate head of the Social Science Division (Research) at the University of Oxford. He was also previously a trustee of both the Council For British Archaeology and the Institute of Field Archaeologists (now Chartered Institute for Archaeologists).

Pollard is also one of the managing editors of the journal Archaeometry, as well as being a member of the board of trustees.

== Related researchers ==
- Dr Carl Heron, Student, Director of Scientific Research at the British Museum.
- Dame Jessica Rawson, Collaborator, Emerita Principal of Merton College, Oxford and noted Chinese Archaeologist.
- Professor Chris Gosden, Collaborator, Professor of European Prehistory at the University of Oxford.
