= Christine Hastorf =

Archaeologist

Christine Hastorf FSA

Academic background
- Education: University of California, Los Angeles

Academic work
- Discipline: Archaeology
- Sub-discipline: Archaeobotany
- Institutions: University of California, Berkeley

Christine Hastorf FSA is an archaeologist and is currently Professor in the Anthropology department at the University of California, Berkeley. Her research focuses on agriculture, political complexity, gender, archaeobotany, and the archaeology of the Andes.

== Biography ==
Hastorf received her Phd from UCLA in 1983. Hastorf has worked on the shores of Lake Titicaca, Bolivia since 1992. At Berkeley, Hastorf directs the Archaeological Research Facility as well as the McCown Archaeobotany Laboratory, and is the Curator of South American Archaeology at the Phoebe A. Hearst Museum of Anthropology. In the late 1970s Hastorf undertook research on the stable isotope composition on Andean grains.

She has produced several key volumes in archaeology, including Current Paleoethnobotany with Virginia Popper, The Uses of Style with Margaret Conkey.

Hastorf won the Society for American Archaeology Fryxell Award for Excellence in the Botanical Sciences in Archaeology in 2012. Hastorf is a Fellow of the California Academy of Sciences, and was elected as a Fellow of the Society of Antiquaries in 2014. Hastorf has received research grants from the National Science Foundation and the Wenner Gren Foundation for the project 'Multi-Community Formation in the Lake Titicaca Basin Bolivia', and National Geographic. In 2025, Hastorf won the Pomerance Award for scientific contributions to archaeology.

== Selected publications ==
- 1985. C.A. Hastorf and M.J. DeNiro. "Reconstruction of prehistoric plant production and cooking practices by a new isotopic method". Nature 315 (6019). 489.
- 1989. C.A. Hastorf and V.S. Popper (eds). Current Paleoethnobotany: Analytical Methods and Cultural Interpretations of Archaeological Plant Remains. University of Chicago Press.
- 1991. C.A. Hastorf. "Gender, space, and food in prehistory", in J.M. Gero and M. Conkey (eds) Engendering Archaeology: Women and Prehistory. Wiley. 132–159.
- 1993. M.W. Conkey and C.A. Hastorf (eds). The Uses of Style in Archaeology. Cambridge: Cambridge University Press.
- 1993. C.A. Hastorf Agriculture and the Onset of Political Inequality before the Inka. Cambridge: Cambridge University Press.
- 1999. C.A. Hastorf. "Recent research in paleoethnobotany", Journal of Archaeological Research 7(1). 55–103. doi:10.1007/BF02446085.
- 2001. T.N. D'Altroy and C.A. Hastorf. Empire and Domestic Economy. Springer.
- 2003. C.A. Hastorf. "Community with the ancestors: Ceremonies and social memory in the Middle Formative at Chiripa, Bolivia", Journal of Anthropological Archaeology 22(4). 305–332.
- 2003. C.A. Hastorf. "Andean luxury foods: special food for the ancestors, deities and the élite". Antiquity 77: 545–554.
- 2006. S. Atalay and C.A. Hastorf . "Food, meals and daily activities: The habitus of food practices at Neolithic Çatalhöyük". American Antiquity 71(2). 283–319.
- 2008. D.T. Arnold and C.A. Hastorf. Heads of State: Icons, Power, and Politics in the Ancient and Modern Andes.
- 2009. C.A. Hastorf. "Agriculture as Metaphor of the Andean State", in Steven E. Falconer and Charles L. Redman (eds) Polities and Power: Archaeological Perspectives on the Landscapes of Early States. Tucson: University of Arizona Press. 52–72.
- 2017. C.A. Hastorf . The Social Archaeology of Food. Cambridge: Cambridge University Press.
- 2017. C.A. Hastorf and L. Foxhall. "The social and political aspects of food surplus". World Archaeology 49(1). 26–39.
