= Dolores Piperno =

American archaeologist (born 1949)

- Born: 1949 (age 76–77)
- Education: Rutgers University (BS) Temple University (PhD)
- Scientific career
- Fields: Archaeobotany
- Workplaces: Smithsonian Tropical Research Institute National Museum of Natural History
- Doctoral advisor: Anthony Ranere

Dolores Rita Piperno (born 1949) is an American archaeologist specializing in archaeobotany. She is a senior scientist emeritus of the Smithsonian Tropical Research Institute in Balboa, Panama and the Smithsonian National Museum of Natural History, Washington.

== Early life and education ==
Piperno grew up in Philadelphia before her family moved to Pennsauken, N.J. Piperno earned a B.S. in Medical Technology (Rutgers University, 1971). After graduating, she began her career as a medical technician at the Hematology Research Center of Presbyterian Hospital in Philadelphia. She says she used this training and experience in this field when she moved into archaeology. She then pursued an M.A. in Anthropology (Temple University, 1979), and a Ph.D. in Anthropology (Temple University, 1983).

== Research and career ==
Dr. Piperno has worked extensively in the Amazon and Central America. She has also worked in Israel. Her research interests include the study of phytoliths, starch grains, and pollen at archaeological sites near the beginning of the domestication of various crops such as cucurbits, maize (corn), and peanuts. She is well known for her groundbreaking work with Klaus Winter on the origin of corn which included the construction of a greenhouse which replicated ancient environmental conditions. She and her colleagues have also found evidence for the earliest popcorn. She has developed some of the procedures commonly used in phytolith studies in archaeology and is one of the pioneers in the archaeological study of starch grains. She has built up a reference collection of over 400 species. Piperno has also studied plant remains in Neanderthal teeth calculus to reconstruct ancient diets.

== Honors and awards ==
In 2005 Piperno was elected to the National Academy of Sciences. The Republic of Panama awarded her with the Orden de Vasco Nuñez de Balboa in 2006. In 2009 Piperno received the Pomerance Award for Scientific Contributions to Archaeology from the Archaeological Institute of America. In 2011 Piperno received the National Museum of Natural History Science Achievement Award.

== Personal life ==
Piperno has a daughter named Jenny and enjoys playing golf, reading history books, and gardening.

== Selected publications ==
- Piperno DR, Ranere AJ, Holst I, Hansell P (October 2000). "Starch grains reveal early root crop horticulture in the Panamanian tropical forest". Nature. 407 (6806): 894–7. Bibcode:2000Natur.407..894P. doi:10.1038/35038055. PMID 11057665. S2CID 4429117.
- Piperno DR, Pearsall DM (1998). The Origins of Agriculture in the Lowland Neotropics. Academic Press. ISBN 978-0-12-557180-7.
- Piperno DR (1988). Phytolith Analysis: An Archaeological and Geological Perspective. Academic Press. ISBN 978-0-12-557175-3.
