= Anna Marie Farnsworth =

American chemist and archaeologist (1895–1991)

- Farnsworth, from the 1915 yearbook of the University of Central Missouri
- Born: July 19, 1895; La Tour, Missouri, U.S.
- Died: June 8, 1991 (aged 95); Holden, Missouri, U.S.
- Occupations: Chemist, college professor

Anna Marie Farnsworth (July 19, 1895 – June 8, 1991), usually known as Marie Farnsworth, was an American chemist. She is considered "a pioneer in archaeological science and materials analysis."

== Early life and education ==
Farnsworth was born in La Tour, Missouri, the daughter of Isaac Girdner Farnsworth and Frances Edna Davis Farnsworth. Her father was a banker. She attended the University of Central Missouri and graduated from the University of Chicago in 1918. She earned a Ph.D. in chemistry there in 1922, with a dissertation titled "The Equilibrium of Carbon Dioxide with Carbon Monoxide and Oxygen in the Corona Discharge." She was a member of Phi Beta Kappa and Sigma Xi honor societies. Her sister Goldena Farnsworth was head of the physics department at Hollins College in Virginia.

== Career ==
Farnsworth taught for a year at Iowa State University after graduate school. From 1924 to 1928 she was a chemist with the United States Bureau of Mines, at the bureau's Nonmetallic Minerals Experiment Station in New Jersey. She taught chemistry at New York University from 1926 to 1935. In 1927, she and Emma P. Carr were named to the faculty of the American Chemical Society's Institute of Chemistry, a summer educational program at Penn State.

In the 1930s, after an extended trip in Europe, Farnsworth went to work as a researcher at the Fogg Art Museum at Harvard University. She joined Theodore Leslie Shear's archaeological investigation in Greece in 1937 and 1938, on a grant from the American Philosophical Society. She returned to research chemistry during World War II, and worked for the Metal & Thermit Corporation (also known as M&T Chemicals) in New Jersey, from 1941 to 1961. "One has to make a living," she explained in a 1986 interview, "and you couldn’t make as much money in archaeology as you could in chemistry".

Her archaeological interests remained, and she spent time in Greece when she could, studying and analyzing ancient pottery clays and glazes, and publishing her findings as an independent scholar. In 1980, she received the first Pomerance Award from the Archaeological Institute of America. She taught chemistry for archaeologists at University of Missouri from 1965 to 1968.

== Publications ==
Farnsworth's work was published in scientific journals including Economic Geology, Industrial & Engineering Chemistry, Journal of the American Chemical Society, The Journal of Chemical Physics, Analytic Chemistry, Technical Studies in the Field of the Fine Arts, Archaeology, Hesperia, Journal of Chemical Education and American Journal of Archaeology.

=== Chemistry ===
- "Effects of Temperature and Pressure on Gypsum and Anhydrite" (1924)
- "Physical Chemistry of the Calcium Sulphates and Gypsum Reserves" (1925, with Oliver Bowles)
- "The Hydration of Anhydrite" (1925)
- "The Equilibrium of Carbon Dioxide with Carbon Monoxide and Oxygen in the Corona Discharge" (1925, with Gerald L. Wendt)
- "An X-Ray Study of Limes Having Different Plasticities" (1927)
- "The Re–Use of Plaster of Paris Molds" (1927)
- The Theory and Technique of Quantitative Analysis (1928)
- "Women in Chemistry: A Statistical Study" (1928)
- "The Vibration Spectra and Structure of the Cyanogen Halides" (1933, with W. West)
- "Determination of Small Amounts of Tin with Dithiol" (1954, with Joseph Pekola)
- "Determination of Tin in Inorganic and Organic Compounds and Mixtures" (1959, with Joseph Pekola)
- Cadmium Chemicals (1980)

=== Archaeological studies ===
- "Infra-red Absorption of Paint Materials" (1938)
- "The Corrosion and Cleaning of Ancient Bronzes" (1949)
- "Metallographic Examination of a Sample of Metallic Zinc from Ancient Athens" (1949, with Cyril Stanley Smith and J. L. Rodda)
- "Ancient pigments: Particularly second century B.C. pigments from Corinth" (1951)
- "Second Century B. C. Rose Madder from Corinth and Athens" (1951)
- "Fifth Century Intentional Red Glaze" (1958, with Harriet Wisely)
- "Draw Pieces as Aids to Correct Firing" (1960)
- "A Unique Cement from Athens" (1960, with Ivor Simmons)
- "Coloring Agents for Greek Glazes" (1963, with Ivor Simmons)
- "Greek Pottery: A Mineralogical Study" (1964)
- "The Use of Tin on Mycenaean Vases" (1966, with Sara A. Immerwahr)
- "Corinthian Pottery: Technical Studies" (1970)
- "Corinth and Corfu: A Neutron Activation Study of their Pottery" (1977, with I. Perlman and Frank Asaro)

== Personal life ==
Farnsworth moved to Kansas City in 1979, and died in 1991, at the age of 95, at a nursing home in Holden, Missouri. She donated many of her samples and research materials to the Smithsonian Institution.
