= Elizabeth K. Ralph =

American archaeologist, chemist, and field hockey player (1921–1993)

Elizabeth K. Ralph (1921–1993) was a pioneer in the development and application of radiocarbon dating techniques to archaeology. She was also a long-time member of the United States Women's National Field Hockey Team. At the University of Pennsylvania, in the Radiocarbon Laboratory and later in the Museum Applied Science Center for Archaeology (MASCA) at the Penn Museum, Ralph developed methods for dendrochronology, or tree-ring dating, and thermoluminescence for ceramics. She also improved instruments for the measurement of magnetic intensity, including cesium magnetometers, which could detect subsurface anomalies indicating potential archaeological sites. In the 1960s, she used these instruments to help locate the Archaic Greek site of Sybaris in southern Italy. She analyzed and dated materials from dozens of archaeological sites in several countries. Her research was published in journals such as Science and Nature. With her colleague H.N. Michael, she co-authored the textbook Dating Techniques for the Archaeologist, published by MIT Press in 1971. From 1962 to 1982, she served as associate director of the MASCA lab, which she helped establish with support from the National Science Foundation.

== Education and career ==
Elizabeth Katherine Ralph was born and raised in New Jersey. She earned a bachelor's degree in chemistry from Wellesley College in 1942. Her early career included work as a junior electronic engineer at Foote, Pierson, & Co in New Jersey, where she became an assistant to the chief radio engineer and later a project engineer. She then moved to a similar role at Kearfott Manufacturing Company in Newark, New Jersey.

In 1949, Ralph enrolled in a master's degree program in physics at the University of Pennsylvania. In 1951, she interned in the laboratory of Nobel laureate Willard Libby at the University of Chicago, where she received training in radiocarbon techniques. Also in 1951, the Penn Museum hired her to conduct analyses in a Carbon-14 laboratory that she helped to establish within the museum.

In Penn's Radiocarbon Lab, Ralph conducted her first analysis of museum materials on a set of human bones from the Hotu in Iran, excavated by Carleton S. Coon between 1949 and 1951. In an account of this research published in the journal Science in 1955, Ralph listed herself as an affiliate of both the museum and the physics department at the University of Pennsylvania. She acknowledged the support of Gaylord Harnwell (Penn's president and a nuclear physicist) and Froelich Rainey (the Penn Museum's director and an anthropologist) in establishing the lab.

Ralph's work expanded significantly in 1962 when she became associate director of the Museum Applied Science Center for Archaeology (MASCA), established at the Penn Museum with funding from the National Science Foundation. According to a museum spokesperson who commented on her accomplishments after her death, her work in the MASCA lab kept her so busy that she did not complete her PhD in geology from Penn until 1973.

Ralph was an enthusiastic field hockey player and competed for many years on the United States Women's National Field Hockey Team. Robert H. Dyson, director of the Penn Museum known for his excavations at the Neolithic site of Hasanlu in Iran, later recalled that she participated in field hockey tournaments throughout most of her career. Henry N. Michael, with whom she co-authored the book Dating Techniques for the Archaeologist, described her work excavating in southern Italy in the 1960s as "legendary" because she had to walk hundreds of miles across archaeological sites with the improved cesium magnetometers she had devised. Michael attributed the degree of stamina she showed to her membership in the U.S. women's field hockey team, which often competed internationally.

== Research and distinctions ==
In collaboration with her colleague Henry N. Michael, a professor at Temple University and fellow Penn PhD who worked closely with her in the MASCA lab, Ralph developed research on dendrochronology. As a New York Times obituary of Michael noted, they used pine trees as "living calendars," analyzing tree rings with radiocarbon testing to provide dates for archaeologists and other scientists.

Ralph analyzed materials from over fifty sites in eight countries. Her work included analyzing Early Jomon materials from Hokkaido, Japan, and Mayan artifacts from Tikal in Guatemala, as well as samples from the Arctic and Afghanistan. Her contributions to radiocarbon dating included breakthroughs in calibration and the development of the "radiocarbon calendar." She also traveled to archaeological sites in Canada, Mexico, the United Kingdom, Yugoslavia, Turkey, and Egypt to supervise the use of MASCA's carbon-dating instruments in situ.

Elizabeth Ralph retired from MASCA and the University of Pennsylvania in 1982. In 1986, she received the Pomerance Award from the Archaeological Institute of America in recognition of her outstanding contributions to archaeology through science. The Archaeological Institute of America cited Ralph for her numerous publications and achievements, including her leading roles in developing the half-life model of radiocarbon dating, recognizing the need for a correction factor in this process (calibration), and testing instruments for subsurface excavation, as first demonstrated in her work at Sybaris.

== Death and legacies ==
Elizabeth Ralph died in Trenton, New Jersey, in 1993. The archives of the Penn Museum preserve many of her papers within the "MASCA: Froelich Rainey and Elizabeth Ralph Records."
