= Luminescence dating =

Form of dating how long ago mineral grains had been last exposed to sunlight or heating

Luminescence dating refers to a group of chronological dating methods of determining how long ago mineral grains were last exposed to sunlight or sufficient heating. It is useful to geologists and archaeologists who want to know when such an event occurred. It uses various methods to stimulate and measure luminescence.

It includes techniques such as optically stimulated luminescence (OSL), infrared stimulated luminescence (IRSL), radiofluorescence (RF), infrared photoluminescence (IR-PL) and thermoluminescence dating (TL). "Optical dating" typically refers to OSL and IRSL, but not TL. The age range of luminescence dating methods extends from a few years to over one million years for red TL.

Since the early applications of luminescence dating in the 1960/1970s, the field has received growing attention in the scientific community, with more than 3500 publications per year and >200 laboratories across the globe in 2020.

Types of luminescence dating techniques with their stimulation and resetting event.

== Conditions and accuracy ==
Background ionizing radiation around the minerals—for instance quartz or potassium feldspar—buried in the ground causes charge to build up within the minerals. The sources of this natural radiation are cosmic rays and trace amounts of radioactive isotopes of elements such as potassium, uranium, thorium, and rubidium.

The trapped charge accumulates over time at a rate determined by the amount of background radiation at that location. Exposure to light causes the charge to quickly decay and produce light; however, if these mineral grains are stimulated using either light (blue or green for OSL; infrared for IRSL) or heat (for TL), a luminescence signal is emitted as the stored electron energy is released, the intensity of which varies depending on the duration of burial (and hence radiation absorbed) and specific properties of the mineral.

Most luminescence dating methods rely on the assumption that the mineral grains were sufficiently exposed to light or "bleached" at the time of the event being dated. For example, in quartz a short daylight exposure in the range of 1–100 s before burial is sufficient to effectively "reset" the OSL dating clock. This is usually, but not always, the case with aeolian deposits, such as sand dunes and loess, and some water-laid deposits. Single Quartz OSL ages can be determined typically from 100 to 350,000 years BP, and can be reliable when suitable methods are used and proper checks are done. Feldspar IRSL techniques have the potential to extend the datable range out to a million years as feldspars typically have significantly higher dose saturation levels than quartz, though issues regarding anomalous fading will need to be dealt with first. Ages can be obtained outside these ranges, but they should be regarded with caution. The uncertainty of an OSL date is typically 5-10% of the age of the sample.

The most common methods of OSL dating are the so-called multiple-aliquot-dose (MAD) and single-aliquot-regenerative-dose (SAR) technique. In multiple-aliquot testing, a number of grains of sand are stimulated at the same time and the resulting luminescence signature is averaged. The problem with this technique is that the operator does not know the individual figures that are being averaged, and so if there are partially prebleached grains in the sample it can give an exaggerated age. In contrast to the multiple-aliquot method, the SAR method tests the burial ages of individual grains of sand which are then plotted. Mixed deposits can be identified and taken into consideration when determining the age.

Typical luminescence curves recorded during a SAR OSL sequence in the UV wavelength range (around 380 nm). Shown are TL preheat curves and OSL shine-down curves for the natural and regenerated luminescence signal and the test dose signals. The righthand side of the plot shows a typical dose-response curve. Figure produced with the R package 'Luminescence' (v1.1.0).

== History ==
The concept of using luminescence dating in archaeological contexts was first suggested in 1953 by Farrington Daniels, Charles A. Boyd, and Donald F. Saunders, who thought the thermoluminescence response of pottery shards could date the last incidence of heating. Experimental tests on archaeological ceramics followed a few years later in 1960 by Grögler et al. Over the next few decades, thermoluminescence research was focused on heated pottery and ceramics, burnt flints, baked hearth sediments, oven stones from burnt mounds and other heated objects.

In 1963, Aitken et al. noted that TL traps in calcite could be bleached by sunlight as well as heat, and in 1965 Shelkoplyas and Morozov were the first to use TL to date unheated sediments. Throughout the 70s and early 80s TL dating of light-sensitive traps in geological sediments of both terrestrial and marine origin became more widespread.

Optical dating using optically stimulated luminescence (OSL) was developed in 1984 by David J. Huntley and colleagues. Hütt et al. laid the groundwork for the infrared stimulated luminescence (IRSL) dating of potassium feldspars in 1988. The traditional OSL method relies on optical stimulation and transfer of electrons from one trap, to holes located elsewhere in the lattice – necessarily requiring two defects to be in nearby proximity, and hence it is a destructive technique. Nearby electron/hole trapping centres, in particular in feldspars, may suffer from localised tunnelling, which leads to so-called athermal fading of the signal of interest over time.

In 1994, the principles behind optical and thermoluminescence dating were extended to include surfaces made of granite, basalt and sandstone, such as carved rock from ancient monuments and artifacts. Ioannis Liritzis, the initiator of ancient buildings luminescence dating, has shown this in several cases of various monuments.

== Physics ==
Luminescence dating is one of several techniques in which an age is calculated as follows:

$A = \frac{D_e}{\dot{D}}$

Where A is the age, typically given in years or thousand years (ka, ky, kyr), $D_e$ the equivalent dose in Gy (Gray) and $\dot{D}$ in Gy ka^{−1} the environmental dose rate.

Typical OSL curve signal build-up (left) through ionising radiation and depletion (right) through light exposure.

The environmental dose rate is calculated using conversion factors from measurements of radionuclides (^{40}K, ^{238}U, ^{235}U, ^{232}Th and ^{87}Rb) within the sample and its surroundings and the radiation dose rate from cosmic rays. The dose rate is usually in the range of 0.5 - 5 Gy/1000 years. The total absorbed radiation dose is determined by exciting, with light, specific minerals (usually quartz or potassium feldspar) extracted from the sample, and measuring the amount of light emitted as a result. The photons of the emitted light must have higher energies than the excitation photons in order to avoid measurement of ordinary photoluminescence. A sample in which the mineral grains have all been exposed to sufficient daylight (seconds for quartz; hundreds of seconds for potassium feldspar) can be said to be of zero age; when excited it will not emit any such photons. The older the sample is, the more light it emits, up to a saturation limit.

== Minerals ==
The natural minerals that are measured are usually either quartz or potassium feldspar sand-sized grains, or unseparated silt-sized grains. There are advantages and disadvantages to using each. For quartz, blue or green excitation wavelengths are normally used and the near ultra-violet emission is measured (Anti-Stokes shift). For potassium feldspar or silt-sized grains, near infrared excitation (IRSL) is normally used and the violet/blue emissions are measured.

== Comparison to radiocarbon dating ==
Unlike ^{14}C dating, luminescence dating methods do not require a contemporary organic component of the sediment to be dated; just quartz, potassium feldspar, or certain other mineral grains that have been fully bleached during the event being dated. These methods also do not suffer from overestimation of dates when the sediment in question has been mixed with "old carbon", or ^{14}C-deficient carbon that is not the same isotopic ratio as the atmosphere. In a study of the chronology of arid-zone lacustrine sediments from Lake Ulaan in southern Mongolia, Lee et al. discovered that OSL and radiocarbon dates agreed in some samples, but the radiocarbon dates were up to 5800 years older in others.

The sediments with disagreeing ages were determined to be deposited by aeolian processes. Westerly winds delivered an influx of ^{14}C-deficient carbon from adjacent soils and Paleozoic carbonate rocks, a process that is also active today. This reworked carbon changed the measured isotopic ratios, giving a false older age. However, the wind-blown origin of these sediments were ideal for OSL dating, as most of the grains would have been completely bleached by sunlight exposure during transport and burial. Lee et al. concluded that when aeolian sediment transport is suspected, especially in lakes of arid environments, the OSL dating method is superior to the radiocarbon dating method, as it eliminates a common 'old-carbon' error problem.

== Other uses ==
One of the benefits of luminescence dating is that it can be used to confirm the authenticity of an artifact. Under proper low light conditions a sample in the tens of milligrams can be used.

== See also ==
- Dosimetry
