= Melinda A. Zeder =

Archaeologist and curator

- Education: University of Michigan (PhD)
- Awards: American Academy of Arts and Sciences (2008); National Academy of Sciences (2012); Pomerance Award for Scientific Contributions to Archaeology (2016)
- Scientific career
- Fields: Archaeology
- Workplaces: National Museum of Natural History, Smithsonian Institution
- Thesis: (1985)

Melinda A. Zeder is an American archaeologist and Curator Emeritus in the Department of Anthropology of the National Museum of Natural History, Smithsonian Institution. Her zooarchaeological research has revolutionized understandings of animal domestication.

Zeder received her PhD in anthropology from the University of Michigan in 1985 with a dissertation focused on faunal assemblages from the site of Tal-e Malyan in southeastern Iran. She later founded a zooarchaeological consulting firm, and secured a position at the Smithsonian Institution in 1992 as a research scientist in archaeobiology.

She has conducted extensive fieldwork throughout the Near East, including in Iran, Israel, Turkey, and Syria. Her research focuses on the origins of plant and animal domestication, and the impacts of agriculture on human prehistory. She has also pioneered approaches that combine archaeological and genetic analyses of plant and animal remains from archaeological sites.

== Honors ==
Zeder was elected a member of the American Academy of Arts and Sciences in 2008 and the National Academy of Sciences in 2012. She is also a member of the American Association for the Advancement of Science and previously the National Geographic Society Committee for Research and Exploration. In 2016 she received the Pomerance Award for Scientific Contributions to Archaeology from the Archaeological Institute of America.

== Books ==
- Zeder, M. A. (1991) Feeding cities: specialized animal economy in the ancient Near East. Smithsonian Series in Archaeological Inquiry, Smithsonian Institution Press.
- Zeder, M. A. (1997) The American archaeologist: A profile. Rowman Altamira.
- Zeder, M. A., D. Bradley, E. Emshwiller, and B. D. Smith (Eds.) (2006) Documenting Domestication: New Genetic and Archaeological Paradigms. University of California Press. Winner, 2008 Secretary's Research Prize.
- Meadow, R. and Zeder, M. A. (Eds.) (1978) Approaches to Faunal Analysis in the Middle East. Peabody Museum Bulletin No. 2, Peabody Museum, Harvard University.
