= Optically stimulated luminescence =

Method of measuring radiation doses, often used in mineral dating

In physics, optically stimulated luminescence (OSL) is a method for measuring doses from ionizing radiation. It is used in at least two applications:

- Luminescence dating of ancient materials: mainly geological sediments and sometimes fired pottery, bricks etc., although in the latter case thermoluminescence dating is used more often
- Radiation dosimetry, which is the measurement of accumulated radiation dose in the tissues of health care, nuclear, research and other workers, as well as in building materials in regions of nuclear disaster

== Principle ==
The method makes use of electrons trapped between the valence and conduction bands in the crystalline structure of certain minerals (most commonly quartz and feldspar). The trapping sites are imperfections of the lattice — impurities or defects. The ionizing radiation produces electron-hole pairs: Electrons are in the conduction band and holes in the valence band. The electrons that have been excited to the conduction band may become entrapped in the electron or hole traps. Under the stimulation of light, the electrons may free themselves from the trap and get into the conduction band. From the conduction band, they may recombine with holes trapped in hole traps. If the centre with the hole is a luminescence center (radiative recombination centre), emission of light will occur. The photons are detected using a photomultiplier tube. The signal from the tube is then used to calculate the dose that the material had absorbed.

== Use for dosimetry ==
The OSL dosimeter provides a new degree of sensitivity by giving an accurate reading as low as 1 mrem for x-ray and gamma ray photons with energies ranging from 5 keV to greater than 40 MeV. The OSL dosimeter's maximum equivalent dose measurement for x-ray and gamma ray photons is 1000 rem. For beta particles with energies from 150 keV to in excess of 10 MeV, dose measurement ranges from 10 mrem to 1000 rem. Neutron radiation with energies of 40 keV to greater than 35 MeV has a dose measurement range from 20 mrem to 25 rem. In diagnostic imaging, the increased sensitivity of the OSL dosimeter makes it ideal for monitoring employees working in low-radiation environments and for pregnant workers.

== Use for dating ==
To carry out OSL dating, mineral grains have to be extracted from the sample without exposure to light. Most commonly these are so-called coarse grains of 100-200 μm or fine grains of 4-11 μm. Occasionally other grain sizes are used.

The difference between radiocarbon dating and OSL is that the former is used to date organic materials, while the latter is used to date minerals. Events that can be dated using OSL are, for example, the mineral's last exposure to sunlight; Mungo Man, Australia's oldest human find, was dated in this manner. It is also used for dating the deposition of geological sediments after they have been transported by air (aeolian sediments) or rivers (fluvial sediments). In archaeology, OSL dating is applied to ceramics: The dated event is the time of their last heating to a high temperature (in excess of 400 °C).

OSL dating of stone tools in Arabia pushed the "out-of-Africa" date hypothesis of human migration back 50,000 years and added a possible path of migration from the African continent to the Arabian peninsula instead of through Europe. In northern Australia, the petrified nests of mud-wasps have been dated using OSL to give dates for Aboriginal rock-art. The authors comment: "The worldwide distribution of mud-wasps and the demonstrated longevity of their nests should prove a valuable tool in archaeological and palaeoclimatic research. The rapid formation and short period of usage of a nest, and the incorporation of a variety of palaeoecological indicators, makes each mud-wasp nest a ‘snapshot’ of its late Quaternary environment."

The most widely-used OSL method is called single-aliquot regeneration (SAR).
