= Martin Aitken =

British archaeologist (1922–2017)

- Born: 11 March 1922; Stamford, Lincolnshire, England
- Died: 13 June 2017 (aged 95)
- Education: Wadham College, Oxford]
- Occupation: Archaeometrist

Martin Jim Aitken FRS (11 March 1922 – 13 June 2017) was a British archaeometrist.

== Biography ==
Aitken was born in Stamford, Lincolnshire, and studied physics at Wadham College, Oxford. He was a fellow of Linacre College, Oxford. He was Professor of Archaeometry at the University of Oxford from 1985 until he retired in 1989.

Aitken organised annual meetings that became the Symposium on Archaeometry and Archaeological Prospection. He had an interest in absolute dating: radiocarbon dating from 1957, thermoluminescence dating from the 1960s, and later helped develop optically stimulated luminescence as a dating method dating.

He died in June 2017 at the age of 95.

== Bibliography ==
- D. R. Brothwell; A. M. Pollard, eds. (March 2005). "Introduction". Handbook of Archaeological Sciences. Wiley. p. 782. ISBN 978-0-470-01476-9.
