= Minze Stuiver =

Dutch geochemist (1929–2020)

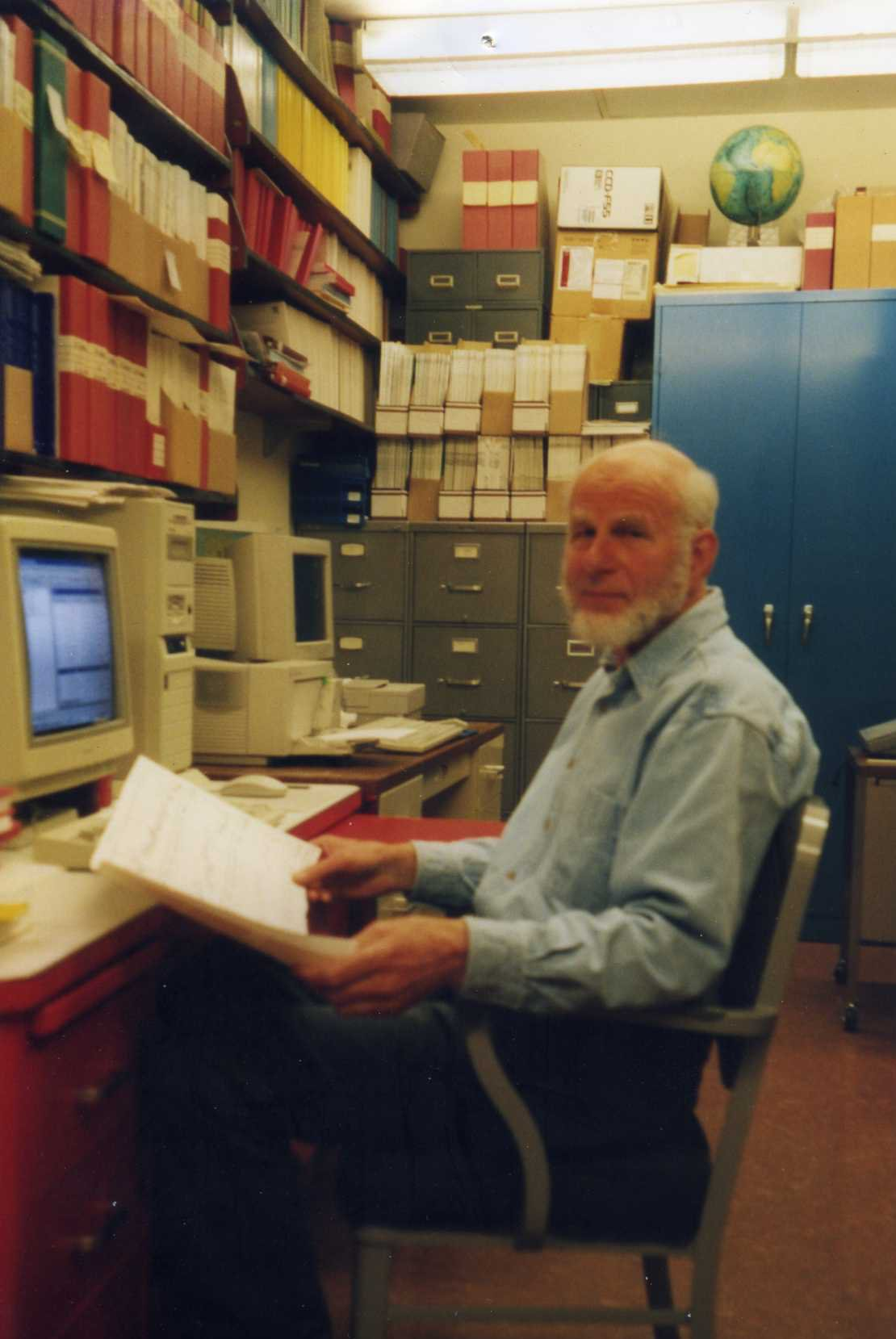
- Professor Minze Stuiver in his office in the Quaternary Isotope Lab at the University of Washington in 1998
- Born: 25 October 1929; Vlagtwedde, Netherlands
- Died: 26 December 2020 (aged 91)
- Education: Graduated from University of Groningen, Ph.D. in Biophysics in 1958
- Occupation: geochemist
- Known for: was at the forefront of geoscience research from the 1960s until his retirement in 1998

Minze Stuiver (25 October 1929 – 26 December 2020) was a Dutch geochemist who was at the forefront of geoscience research from the 1960s until his retirement in 1998. He helped transform radiocarbon dating from a simple tool for archaeology and geology to a precise technique with applications in solar physics, oceanography, geochemistry, and carbon dynamics. Minze Stuiver's research encompassed the use of radiocarbon (^{14}C) to understand solar cycles and radiocarbon production, ocean circulation, lake carbon dynamics and archaeology as well as the use of stable isotopes to document past climate changes.

== Biography ==
Minze Stuiver was born in Vlagtwedde, the Netherlands, on 25 October 1929. As a boy he narrowly missed being taken into German forced labor toward the end of the Second World War, but, because he was away delivering milk by bicycle, he escaped the round-up that took most of the young men and older boys from the village. His secondary school education was disrupted by the war when the school was occupied by German soldiers and air raids interrupted classes in makeshift rooms. After the war he went to the University of Groningen, where he studied physics, mathematics and astronomy, focusing on nuclear physics. After graduation he joined the biophysics group led by the pre-eminent researcher Hessel de Vries and received a Ph.D. in Biophysics in 1958 with a thesis on the Biophysics of the Sense of Smell. Shortly thereafter he began working in the rapidly developing field of radiocarbon dating with de Vries, who found variations in the concentration of radiocarbon in the atmosphere which challenged the assumptions of the radiocarbon dating method. In 1959, together with his wife, Anneke, Minze went to Yale University for a one-year fellowship position but was called back to Groningen to take over as director of the radiocarbon facility when De Vries died. However Minze chose to remain in the United States at the Geochrometric Laboratory at Yale University. There he developed high-precision methods in radiocarbon that enabled him, along with Hans Suess, to verify De Vries’ “wiggly” nature of the atmospheric concentration of radiocarbon in the past from tree-rings. Stuiver and Suess created one of the first curves for calibration of radiocarbon dates. In 1969 Minze moved to the newly founded Quaternary Research Center at the University of Washington (UW) in Seattle. There he built the Quaternary Isotope Lab with a lead-lined room 30 feet below ground to shield the hand-built gas counters from detecting spurious events due to cosmic rays.

In the 1970s Minze began measuring ^{14}C in dissolved inorganic carbon in ocean water as part of The Geochemical Ocean Sections Study (GEOSECS) to study the distribution of carbon in the ocean. In addition he was involved in a number of studies on the glacial histories of Antarctica and North America. He was the senior editor of the journal Radiocarbon from 1977 to 1988 and broadened the scope of the publication to include articles about scientific knowledge derived from radiocarbon measurements. By then the terminology for various ways to calculate and present radiocarbon data was becoming rather confusing. Together with Henry Polach, he formulated the equations and conventions for reporting radiocarbon data that is still widely used. His work investigating atmospheric ^{14}C changes gave rise to a greater understanding of the changes in solar activity over time and potential links to climate change as well as the extent of fossil fuel input.

In the mid-1980s he led the development of the first high-precision radiocarbon calibration curve extending back nearly 10,000 years ago based on ^{14}C measurements of tree-rings with known calendar ages from dendrochronology. This data still forms the backbone of the Holocene portion of the current international radiocarbon calibration curve which is used by archaeologists and geoscientists around the world. He also oversaw the development of the CALIB computer software to automate the calibration process.

In the 1990s, in addition to continued work on radiocarbon calibration and solar variability, he began work on oxygen isotopes from Greenland ice cores together with Pieter Grootes. Their sub-annual resolution stable isotopes measurements provided confirmation of the rapid nature of major climatic changes at the end of the last glaciation.

Stuiver died on 26 December 2020, at the age of 91.

== Awards ==
- 1983: Humboldt Prize.
- 1997: The Advisory Committee on Antarctic Names (US-ACAN) named Stuiver Valley in Antarctica after Minze Stuiver for his work on radiocarbon dating Antarctic samples.
- 1993: The 13th Pomerance Award of the Archaeological Institute of America for Scientific Contributions to Archaeology went to Minze Stuiver along with Michael G. L. Baillie, Bernd Becker, Gordon W. Pearson, Jonathan R. Pilcher, and Hans Suess.
- 2000: Received The American Quaternary Association Distinguished Career Award.
- 2001: Thomson Reuters most cited paper in geosciences for the 1990s.
- 2005: Awarded the Geological Society of America's Penrose Gold Medal for outstanding original contributions or achievements that mark a major advance in the science of geology.
- 2009: Awarded an honorary doctorate at Queen's University Belfast.
