= Thermoluminescence dating =

Radiometric tool for geochronology

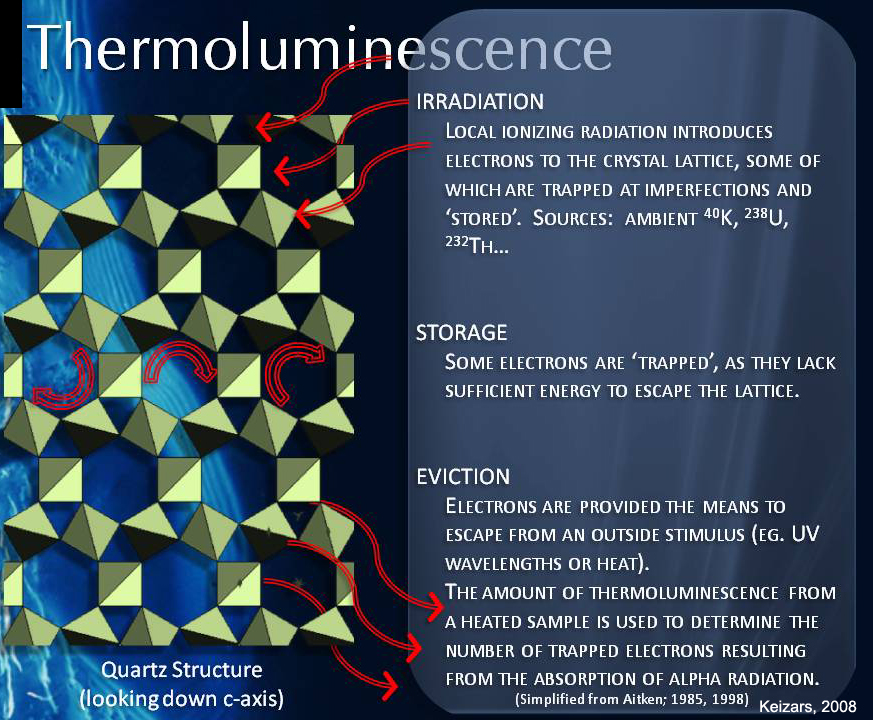
Figure 1: The three stages of thermoluminescence as outlined by Aitken (1985, 1998) and applied to a quartz grain (Keizars, 2008b)

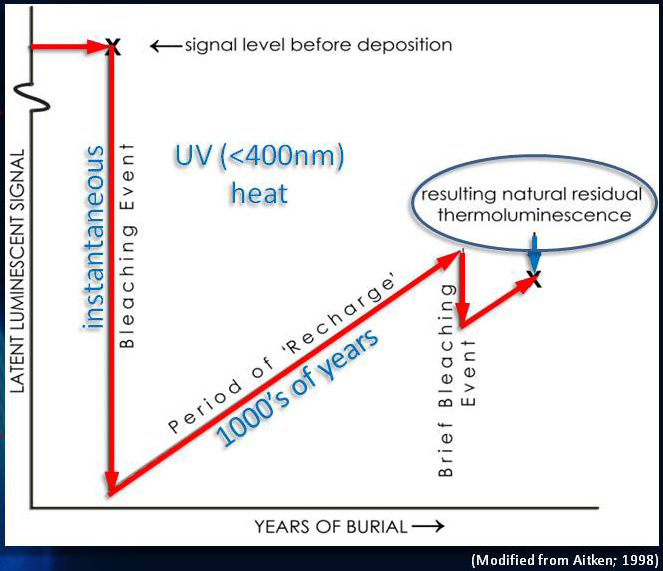
Figure 2: The process of recharging and discharging thermoluminescent signal, as applied to beach sands. (modified from Aitken, 1998; Keizars, 2008a)

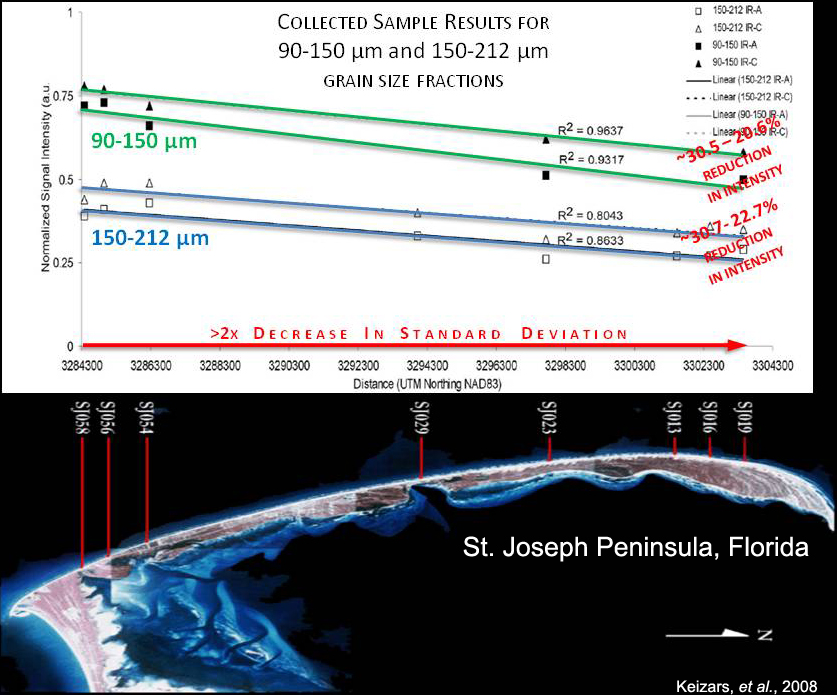
Figure 3: Thermoluminescence signature lost during migration of two sand grain sizes (Keizars, 2008).

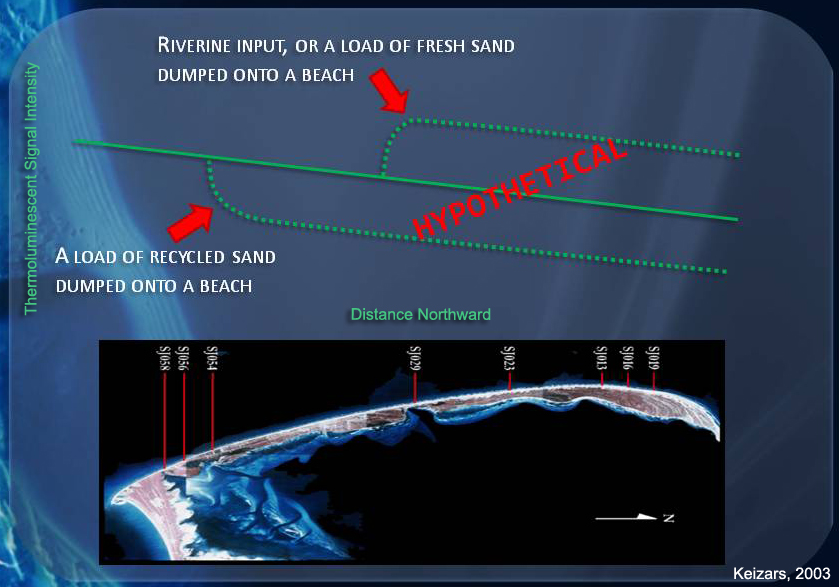
Figure 4: Illustrated method of passively monitoring sand input (Keizars, 2003).

Thermoluminescence dating (TL) is the determination, by means of measuring the accumulated radiation dose, of the time elapsed since material containing crystalline minerals was either heated (lava, ceramics) or exposed to sunlight (sediments). As a crystalline material is heated during measurements, the process of thermoluminescence starts. Thermoluminescence emits a weak light signal that is proportional to the radiation dose absorbed by the material. It is a type of luminescence dating.

The technique has wide application, and is relatively cheap at some US$300–700 per object; ideally a number of samples are tested. Sediments are more expensive to date. The destruction of a relatively significant amount of sample material is necessary, which can be a limitation in the case of artworks. The heating must have taken the object above 500 °C, which covers most ceramics, although very high-fired porcelain creates other difficulties. It will often work well with stones that have been heated by fire. The clay core of bronze sculptures made by lost wax casting is also able to be tested.

Different materials vary considerably in their suitability for the technique, depending on several factors. Subsequent irradiation, for example if an x-ray is taken, can affect accuracy, as will the "annual dose" of radiation a buried object has received from the surrounding soil. Ideally this is assessed by measurements made at the precise findspot over a long period. For artworks, it may be sufficient to confirm whether a piece is broadly ancient or modern (that is, authentic or a fake), and this may be possible even if a precise date cannot be estimated.

== Functionality ==
Natural crystalline materials contain imperfections: impurity ions, stress dislocations, and other phenomena that disturb the regularity of the electric field that holds the atoms in the crystalline lattice together. These imperfections lead to local humps and dips in the crystalline material's electric potential. Where there is a dip (a so-called "electron trap"), a free electron may be attracted and trapped.

The flux of ionizing radiation—both from cosmic radiation and from natural radioactivity—excites electrons from atoms in the crystal lattice into the conduction band where they can move freely. Most excited electrons will soon recombine with lattice ions, but some will be trapped, storing part of the energy of the radiation in the form of trapped electric charge (Figure 1).

Depending on the depth of the traps (the energy required to free an electron from them) the storage time of trapped electrons will vary as some traps are sufficiently deep to store charge for hundreds of thousands of years.

== In practical use ==
Another important technique in testing samples from a historic or archaeological site is a process known as thermoluminescence testing, which involves the principle that all objects absorb radiation from the environment. This process frees electrons within elements or minerals that remain caught within the item. Thermoluminescence testing involves heating a sample until it releases a type of light, which is then measured to determine the last time the item was heated.

In thermoluminescence dating, these long-term traps are used to determine the age of materials: When irradiated crystalline material is again heated or exposed to strong light, the trapped electrons are given sufficient energy to escape. In the process of recombining with a lattice ion, they lose energy and emit photons (light quanta), detectable in the laboratory.

The amount of light produced is proportional to the number of trapped electrons that have been freed which is in turn proportional to the radiation dose accumulated. In order to relate the signal (the thermoluminescence—light produced when the material is heated) to the radiation dose that caused it, it is necessary to calibrate the material with known doses of radiation since the density of traps is highly variable.

Thermoluminescence dating presupposes a "zeroing" event in the history of the material, either heating (in the case of pottery or lava) or exposure to sunlight (in the case of sediments), that removes the pre-existing trapped electrons. Therefore, at that point the thermoluminescence signal is zero.

As time goes on, the ionizing radiation field around the material causes the trapped electrons to accumulate (Figure 2). In the laboratory, the accumulated radiation dose can be measured, but this by itself is insufficient to determine the time since the zeroing event.

The Radiation Dose Rate - the dose accumulated per year-must be determined first. This is commonly done by measurement of the alpha radioactivity (the uranium and thorium content) and the potassium content (K-40 is a beta and gamma emitter) of the sample material.

Often the gamma radiation field at the position of the sample material is measured, or it may be calculated from the alpha radioactivity and potassium content of the sample environment, and the cosmic ray dose is added in. Once all components of the radiation field are determined, the accumulated dose from the thermoluminescence measurements is divided by the dose accumulating each year, to obtain the years since the zeroing event.

== Relation to radiocarbon dating ==
Thermoluminescence dating is used for material where radiocarbon dating is not available, like sediments. Its use is now common in the authentication of old ceramic wares, for which it gives the approximate date of the last firing. An example of this can be seen in Rink and Bartoll, 2005.

Thermoluminescence dating was modified for use as a passive sand migration analysis tool by Keizars, et al., 2008 (Figure 3), demonstrating the direct consequences resulting from the improper replenishment of starving beaches using fine sands, as well as providing a passive method of policing sand replenishment and observing riverine or other sand inputs along shorelines (Figure 4).

Typical quartz TL curve measured with a UV filter during routine TL dating.

== Relation to other luminescence dating methods ==
Optically stimulated luminescence dating is a related measurement method which replaces heating with exposure to intense light. The sample material is illuminated with a very bright source of green or blue light (for quartz) or infrared light (for potassium feldspar). Ultraviolet light emitted by the sample is detected for measurement.

== See also ==
- Geochronology
- Luminescence dating
- Rehydroxylation dating
- Thermoluminescent dosimeter

== Notes ==
Oxford Authentication: Home - TL Testing Authentication 'Oxford Authentication® Ltd authenticates ceramic antiquities using the scientific technique of thermoluminescence (TL). TL testing is a dating method for archaeological items which can distinguish between genuine and fake antiquities.' See some of their case studies here: https://www.oxfordauthentication.com/case-studies/

== References and bibliography ==
- GlobalNet.co.uk, Quaternary TL Surveys - Guide to thermoluminescence date measurement
- Aitken, M.J., Thermoluminescence Dating, Academic Press, London (1985) – Standard text for introduction to the field. Quite complete and rather technical, but well written and well organized. There is a second edition.
- Aitken, M.J., Introduction to Optical Dating, Oxford University Press (1998) – Good introduction to the field.
- Keizars, K.Z. 2003. NRTL as a method of analysis of sand transport along the coast of the St. Joseph Peninsula, Florida. GAC/MAC 2003. Presentation: Brock University, St. Catharines, Ontario, Canada.
- JCRonline.org, Ķeizars, Z., Forrest, B., Rink, W.J. 2008. Natural Residual Thermoluminescence as a Method of Analysis of Sand Transport along the Coast of the St. Joseph Peninsula, Florida. Journal of Coastal Research, 24: 500–507.
- Keizars, Z. 2008b. NRTL trends observed in the sands of St. Joseph Peninsula, Florida. Queen's University. Presentation: Queen's University, Kingston, Ontario, Canada.
- Liritzis, I., 2011. Surface Dating by Luminescence: An Overview. Geochronometria, 38(3): 292–302.
- Mortlock, AJ; Price, D and Gardiner, G. The Discovery and Preliminary Thermoluminescence Dating of Two Aboriginal Cave Shelters in the Selwyn Ranges, Queensland [online]. Australian Archaeology, No. 9, Nov 1979: 82–86. Availability: <> ISSN 0312-2417. [cited 04 Feb 15].
- Antiquity.ac.uk, Rink, W. J., Bartoll, J. 2005. Dating the geometric Nasca lines in the Peruvian desert. Antiquity, 79: 390–401.
- Sullasi, H. S., Andrade, M. B., Ayta, W. E. F., Frade, M., Sastry, M. D., & Watanabe, S. (2004). Irradiation for dating Brazilian fish fossil by thermoluminescence and EPR technique. Nuclear Instruments and Methods in Physics Research Section B: Beam Interactions with Materials and Atoms, 213, 756–760.doi:10.1016/S0168-583X(03)01698-7
