= Geological history of Mars =

Physical evolution of the planet Mars

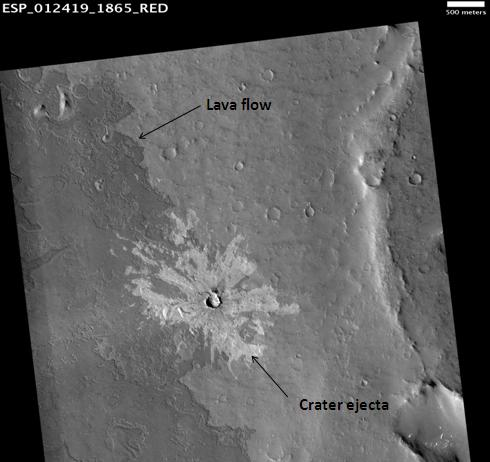
HiRISE image illustrating Steno's law of superposition. The dark-toned lava flow overlies (is younger than) the light-toned terrain at right. The ejecta of the crater at centre overlies both units, indicating that the crater is younger than both units.

The geological history of Mars follows the physical evolution of Mars as substantiated by observations, indirect and direct measurements, and various inference techniques. Methods dating back to 17th-century techniques developed by Nicholas Steno, including the so-called law of superposition and stratigraphy, used to estimate the geological histories of Earth and the Moon, are being actively applied to the data available from several Martian observational and measurement resources. These include landers, orbiting platforms, Earth-based observations, and Martian meteorites.

Observations of the surfaces of many Solar System bodies reveal important clues about their evolution. For example, a lava flow that spreads out and fills a large impact crater is likely to be younger than the crater. On the other hand, a small crater on top of the same lava flow is likely to be younger than both the lava and the larger crater since it can be surmised to have been the product of a later, unobserved, geological event. This principle, called the law of superposition, along with other principles of stratigraphy first formulated by Nicholas Steno in the 17th century, allowed geologists of the 19th century to divide the history of the Earth into the familiar eras of Paleozoic, Mesozoic, and Cenozoic. The same methodology was later applied to the Moon and then to Mars.

Another stratigraphic principle used on planets where impact craters are well preserved is that of crater number density. The number of craters greater than a given size per unit surface area (usually a million km^{2}) provides a relative age for that surface. Heavily cratered surfaces are old, and sparsely cratered surfaces are young. Old surfaces have many big craters, and young surfaces have mostly small craters or none at all. These stratigraphic concepts form the basis for the Martian geologic timescale.

== Relative ages from stratigraphy ==
Stratigraphy establishes the relative ages of layers of rock and sediment by denoting differences in composition (solids, liquids, and trapped gasses). Assumptions are often incorporated about the rate of deposition, which generates a range of potential age estimates across any set of observed sediment layers.

== Absolute ages ==
On Earth, the primary method for calibrating geological ages to a calendar is radiometric dating. Combining the constraints from multiple different radioisotope systems can improve the precision in an age estimate. Using stratigraphic principles, the ages of geological units can usually only be determined relative to each other. For example, Mesozoic rock strata making up the Cretaceous system lie on top of rocks of the Jurassic system, so the Cretaceous is more recent than the Jurassic. However, this tells us nothing about how long ago either the Cretaceous or Jurassic periods were, only their relative order. Absolute ages from radiometric dating are required to calibrate the stratigraphic sequence. This requires laboratory analysis of physical samples retrieved from locations with known stratigraphy, which is generally only possible for rocks on Earth. A small number of absolute ages have also been determined for rock units on the Moon, from which samples have been returned to Earth. Lunar relative ages are provided by crater counting. Although the number of calibration points is small, this has allowed the derivation of an approximate dating system for the Moon.

Assigning absolute ages to rock units on Mars is far more problematic. Numerous attempts have been made over the years to determine an absolute Martian chronology (timeline) by comparing estimated impact cratering rates for Mars to those on the Moon. If the rate of impact crater formation on Mars by crater size per unit area over geologic time (the production rate or flux) is known with precision, then crater densities also provide a way to determine absolute ages. Unfortunately, practical difficulties in crater counting and uncertainties in estimating the flux still create huge uncertainties in the ages derived from these methods. Martian meteorites have provided datable samples that are consistent with ages calculated thus far, but the locations on Mars from where the meteorites came (provenance) are unknown, limiting their value as chronostratigraphic tools. Absolute ages determined by crater density should therefore be taken with some skepticism.

Mars - horizon views (video; 1:24; Odyssey orbiter; THEMIS camera; 9 May 2023)

== Crater density timescale ==
Studies of impact crater densities on the Martian surface have delineated four broad periods in the planet's geologic history. The periods were named after places on Mars that had large-scale surface features, such as large craters or widespread lava flows, that date back to these time periods. The absolute ages given here are only approximate. From oldest to youngest, the time periods are:

- Pre-Noachian: the interval from the accretion and differentiation of the planet about 4.5 billion years ago (Gya) to the formation of the Hellas impact basin, between 4.1 and 3.8 Gya. Most of the geologic record of this interval has been erased by subsequent erosion and high impact rates. The crustal dichotomy is thought to have formed during this time, along with the Argyre and Isidis basins.

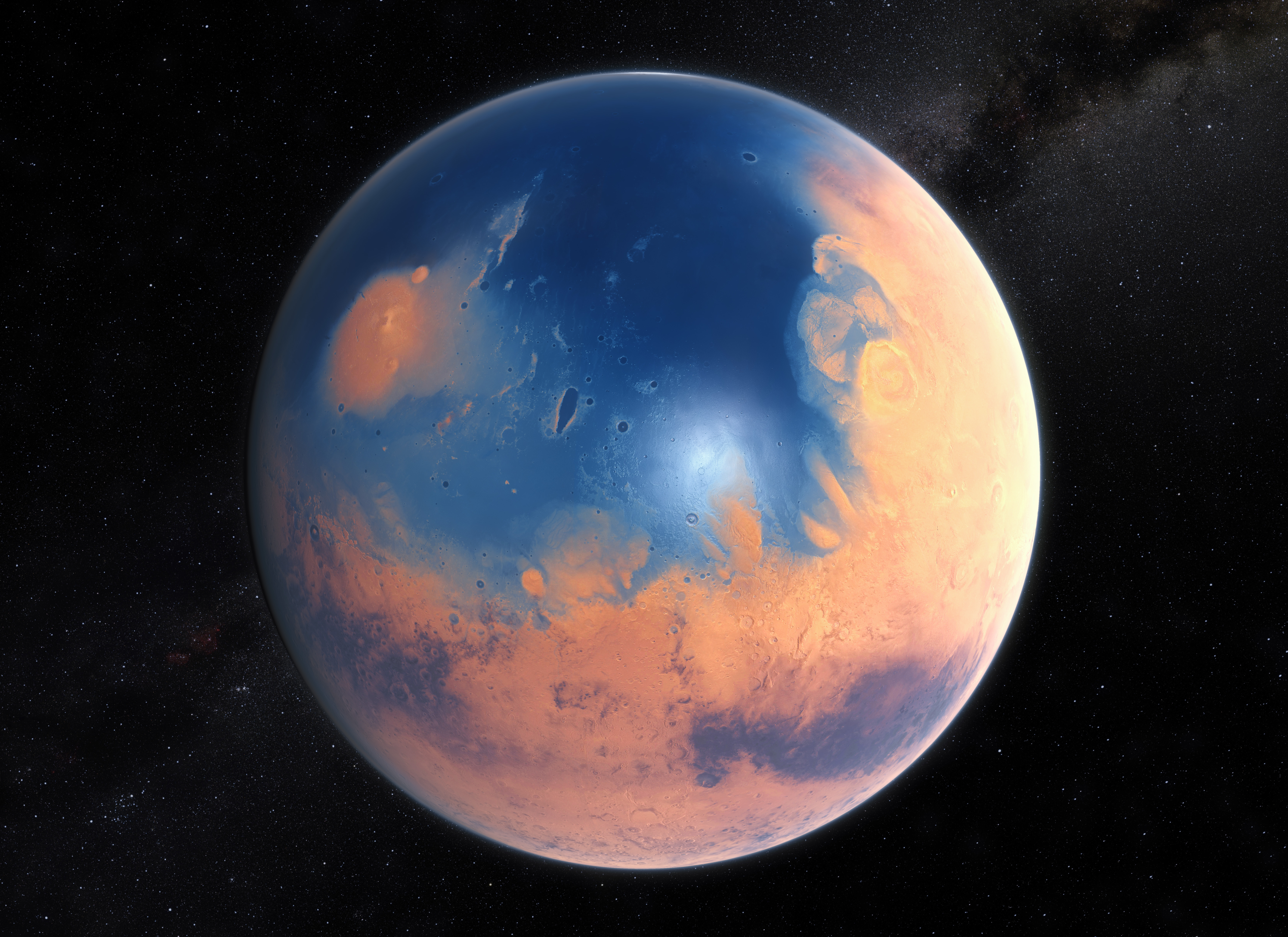
Artist's impression of Mars four billion years ago

- Noachian Period (named after Noachis Terra): Formation of the oldest extant surfaces of Mars between 4.1 and about 3.7 Gya. Noachian-aged surfaces are scarred by many large impact craters. The Tharsis bulge is thought to have formed during the Noachian, along with extensive erosion by liquid water producing river valley networks. Large lakes or oceans may have been present.
- Hesperian Period (named after Hesperia Planum): 3.7 to approximately 3.0 Gya. It is marked by the formation of extensive lava plains. The formation of Olympus Mons probably began during this period. Catastrophic releases of water carved out extensive outflow channels around Chryse Planitia and elsewhere. Ephemeral lakes or seas may have formed in the northern lowlands.
- Amazonian Period (named after Amazonis Planitia): 3.0 Gya to present. Amazonian regions have few meteorite impact craters but are otherwise quite varied. Lava flows, glacial/periglacial activity, and minor releases of liquid water continued during this period.
Martian time periods (millions of years ago)

The date of the Hesperian/Amazonian boundary is particularly uncertain and could range anywhere from 3.0 to 1.5 Gya. Basically, the Hesperian is thought of as a transitional period between the end of heavy bombardment and the cold, dry Mars seen today.

== Mineral alteration timescale ==
In 2006, researchers using data from the OMEGA Visible and Infrared Mineralogical Mapping Spectrometer on board the Mars Express orbiter proposed an alternative Martian timescale based on the predominant type of mineral alteration that occurred on Mars due to different styles of chemical weathering in the planet's past. They proposed dividing the history of Mars into three eras: the Phyllocian, Theiikian and Siderikan.

- The Phyllocian (named after phyllosilicate or clay minerals that characterize the era) lasted from the formation of the planet until around the Early Noachian (about 4.0 Gya). OMEGA identified outcroppings of phyllosilicates at numerous locations on Mars, all in rocks that were exclusively Pre-Noachian or Noachian in age (most notably in rock exposures in Nili Fossae and Mawrth Vallis). Phyllosillicates require a water-rich, alkaline environment to form. The Phyllocian era correlates with the age of valley network formation on Mars, suggesting an early climate that was conducive to the presence of abundant surface water. It is thought that deposits from this era are the best candidates in which to search for evidence of past life on the planet.
- The Theiikian (named after sulphurous in Greek, for the sulphate minerals that were formed) lasted until about 3.5 Gya. It was an era of extensive volcanism, which released large amounts of sulphur dioxide (SO_{2}) into the atmosphere. The SO_{2} combined with water to create a sulphuric acid-rich environment that allowed the formation of hydrated sulphates (notably kieserite and gypsum).
- The Siderikan (named for iron in Greek, for the iron oxides that formed) lasted from 3.5 Gya until the present. With the decline of volcanism and available water, the most notable surface weathering process has been the slow oxidation of the iron-rich rocks by atmospheric peroxides producing the red iron oxides that give the planet its familiar colour.
