= Pre-Noachian =

Geological system and early time period of Mars

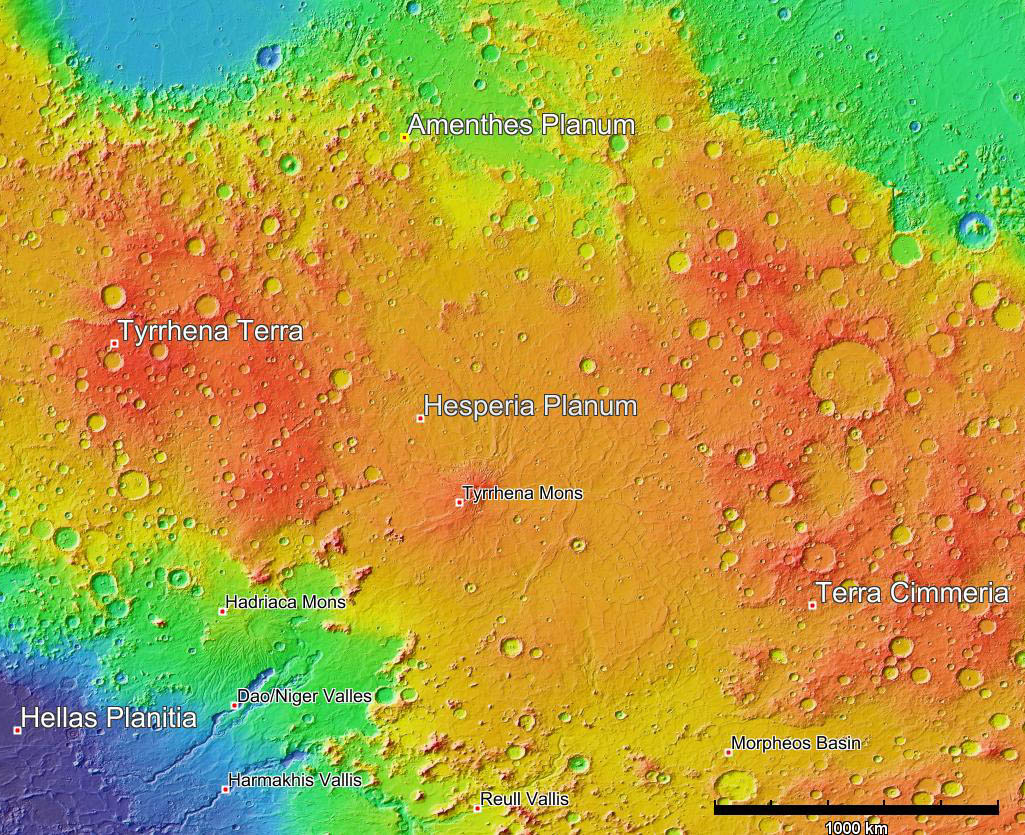
- MOLA colorized relief and elevation map of the Hesperia Planum region. Hesperia Planum is considered to show aspects of Mars' geological evolution from the Pre-Noachian to the Noachian periods. It showcases lowlands representing the Pre-Noachian landscape, alongside higher terrain indicative of the Noachian era.

Usage information
- Celestial body: Mars
- Time scale(s) used: Martian Geologic Timescale

The Pre-Noachian period is a geological system and early time period on Mars marked by intense meteoroid and asteroid impacts, volcanic and tectonic activity, and the potential presence of surface or subsurface water. The era holds significant importance in Mars' history as it witnessed the planet's formation and the shaping of its geological features. However, understanding the Pre-Noachian period remains elusive, as it is the least comprehended among Mars' four geological epochs. Much of the evidence from this period has been obscured by erosion and deposition processes.

During the Pre-Noachian period, the northern hemisphere of Mars developed lowlands, which may have served as reservoirs for ancient Martian water during subsequent epochs. These lowlands likely formed through lava erosion caused by extensive volcanic activity, as the Pre-Noachian period experienced the highest level of volcanic activity among all Martian epochs.

The atmosphere of Mars during the Pre-Noachian period was denser than it is today, containing higher concentrations of carbon dioxide from volcanic and meteorite outgassing. This may have led to a greenhouse effect on Mars and the formation of various minerals, including silicates, iron oxide, sulfates, carbonates, clays, and hydrates, due to intense heat. Meteorite outgassing is believed to have caused water vapor to condense into Mars' atmosphere, eventually precipitating onto the surface and forming oceans during subsequent epochs. Over time, gases trapped by Mars' gravity during the Pre-Noachian period have gradually escaped into space as the planet cooled.

During this era, Mars possessed a distinctive magnetic field, indicating an active core. As magma cooled in the planet's lower layers, it generated metals necessary for the formation of the magnetic field.

== Description and name origin ==
The Pre-Noachian System and Period is named after Noachis Terra, a region of highlands west of the Hellas Planitia basin, and the pre comes from the word meaning before.

== Pre-Noachian chronology and stratigraphy ==
Schematic cross section of image at left. Surface units are interpreted as a sequence of layers (strata), with the youngest at top and oldest at bottom in accordance with the law of superposition.

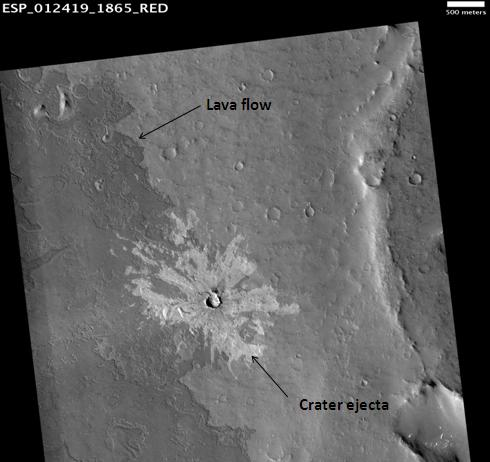
HiRISE image illustrating superpositioning, a principle that lets geologists determine the relative ages of surface units. The dark-toned lava flow overlies (is younger than) the light-toned, more heavily cratered terrain at right. The ejecta of the crater at center overlies both units, indicating that the crater is the youngest feature in the image. (See cross section, above right.)

Martian time periods are based on geological mapping of surface units from spacecraft images. A surface unit is a terrain with a distinct texture, color, albedo, spectral property, or set of landforms that distinguish it from other surface units and is large enough to be shown on a map. Mappers use a stratigraphic approach pioneered in the early 1960s for photogeologic studies of the Moon. Although based on surface characteristics, a surface unit is not the surface itself or group of landforms. It is an inferred geologic unit (e.g., formation) representing a sheetlike, wedgelike, or tabular body of rock that underlies the surface. A surface unit may be a crater ejecta deposit, lava flow, or any surface that can be represented in three dimensions as a discrete stratum bound above or below by adjacent units (illustrated right). Using principles such as superpositioning (illustrated left), cross-cutting relationships, and the relationship of impact crater density to age, geologists can place the units into a relative age sequence from oldest to youngest. Units of similar age are grouped globally into larger, time-stratigraphic (chronostratigraphic) units, called systems. For Mars, four systems are defined: the Pre-Noachian, Noachian, Hesperian, and Amazonian. Geologic units lying below (older than) the Noachian are informally designated Pre-Noachian. The geologic time (geochronologic) equivalent of the Pre-Noachian System is the Pre-Noachian Period. Rock or surface units of the Pre-Noachian System were formed or deposited during the Pre-Noachian Period.

=== System vs. Period ===
e h Units in Earth geochronology and stratigraphy
Segments of rock (strata) in chronostratigraphy	Periods of time in geochronology	Notes (Mars)
Eonothem	Eon	not used for Mars
Erathem	Era	not used for Mars
System	Period	3 total; 10^{8} to 10^{9} years in length
Series	Epoch	8 total; 10^{7} to 10^{8} years in length
Stage	Age	not used for Mars
Chronozone	Chron	smaller than an age/stage; not used by the ICS timescale

System and Period are not interchangeable terms in formal stratigraphic nomenclature, although they are frequently confused in popular literature. A system is an idealized stratigraphic column based on the physical rock record of a type area (type section) correlated with rocks sections from many different locations planetwide. A system is bound above and below by strata with distinctly different characteristics (on Earth, usually index fossils) that indicate dramatic (often abrupt) changes in the dominant fauna or environmental conditions. (See Cretaceous–Paleogene boundary as example.)

At any location, rock sections in a given system are apt to contain gaps (unconformities) analogous to missing pages from a book. In some places, rocks from the system are absent entirely due to nondeposition or later erosion. For example, rocks of the Cretaceous System are absent throughout much of the eastern central interior of the United States. However, the time interval of the Cretaceous (Cretaceous Period) still occurred there. Thus, a geologic period represents the time interval over which the strata of a system were deposited, including any unknown amounts of time present in gaps. Periods are measured in years, determined by radioactive dating. On Mars, radiometric ages are not available except from Martian meteorites whose provenance and stratigraphic context are unknown. Instead, absolute ages on Mars are determined by impact crater density, which is heavily dependent upon models of crater formation over time. Accordingly, the beginning and end dates for Martian periods are uncertain, especially for the Hesperian/Amazonian boundary, which may be in error by a factor of 2 or 3.

=== Boundaries and subdivisions ===
The lower boundary of the Pre-Noachian period on Mars is characterized by the emergence of significant geological activity and the initial shaping of the planet's surface during its early history. This boundary is defined by the presence of ancient cratered terrains, volcanic constructs, and impact ejecta deposits dating back to the earliest stages of Martian geological development. While the precise location of this boundary may vary depending on geological context and criteria used for its definition, it marks the beginning of Mars’ geological history as understood by scientists.

In the Pre-Noachian period, the eastern region of Mars featured ridged plains overlaying early to mid-Noachian aged cratered plateau materials. This period marked a significant phase in Mars’ geological history, preceding the Noachian era characterized by its own distinct geological features and processes.

The Pre-Noachian System is subdivided into two chronostratigraphic series: Lower Pre-Noachian and Upper Pre-Noachian. These series are delineated based on specific references or locations on Mars where surface units indicate distinctive geological episodes, identifiable by cratering age and stratigraphic position. For example, Hesperia Planum serves as the referent location for the Lower Pre-Noachian Series. The corresponding geologic time units for the two Pre-Noachian series are the Early Pre-Noachian and Late Pre-Noachian Epochs. It's important to note that an epoch is a subdivision of a period, and the terms are not synonymous in formal stratigraphy. The age of the Early Pre-Noachian/Late Pre-Noachian boundary remains uncertain, with estimates ranging from 4500 to 4100 million years ago based on crater counts.

Stratigraphic terms are often confusing to geologists and non-geologists alike. One way to sort through the difficulty is by the following example: You can easily go to Cincinnati, Ohio and visit a rock outcrop in the Upper Ordovician Series of the Ordovician System. You can even collect a fossil trilobite there. However, you cannot visit the Late Ordovician Epoch in the Ordovician Period and collect an actual trilobite.

The Earth-based scheme of formal stratigraphic nomenclature has been successfully applied to Mars for several decades now but has numerous flaws. The scheme will no doubt become refined or replaced as more and better data become available. (See mineralogical timeline below as example of alternative.) Obtaining radiometric ages on samples from identified surface units is clearly necessary for a more complete understanding of Martian history and chronology.

== Mars during the Pre-Noachian Period ==
During the Pre-Noachian period, Mars experienced significant geological and environmental dynamics. Intense volcanic activity sculpted the planet's surface through widespread eruptions, while impact cratering events left numerous craters across the Martian landscape. The atmosphere during this era was denser than it is today, likely containing higher concentrations of carbon dioxide and other gases, potentially contributing to a greenhouse effect. This atmospheric composition may have facilitated conditions conducive to the presence of liquid water on the surface, with evidence suggesting the existence of water bodies such as lakes, rivers, and possibly even oceans. Geological features such as valleys, channels, and basins formed during this period further support the notion of liquid water on ancient Mars.
