= Deseado =

Deseado may refer to:

== Geographic names and features ==
- Deseado (crater), a crater on the planet Mars
- Deseado Department, a department in Santa Cruz Province, Argentina
- Deseado Massif, a geological formation in Santa Cruz Province, Argentina
- Deseado River, a river in Santa Cruz Province, Argentina
- Puerto Deseado, a city in Santa Cruz Province, Argentina

== Watercraft ==
- SS Deseado, a passenger ship built by Harland and Wolff in 1912
- MV Deseado, refrigerated cargo ship built by Harland and Wolff in 1942
- Deseado (yacht), a yacht abandoned in 2006
