= Succession (geology) =

Geology for a series of strata or rock units in chronological order

In geology, a succession is a series of strata or rock units in chronological order. Rock successions can be seen in cross sections through rock, for example in a road cut or cliff. With sedimentary layers of rocks, newer units will be above older units, except in cases of inversion. This paradigm is also called faunal succession and fossil succession.

William Smith's "discovery that strata may be identified by the fossils they contain became known as the law of faunal succession." As a general rule:

fossil organisms succeed one another in a definite and recognizable order through geologic time as recorded in the rock record. Each geologic formation has a different record of life from that in the formations above it and below it. The principle of faunal succession allows determination of the relative age of rocks using their fossil content.

In this way, "succession became a unifying principle by which rock units are categorized and recognized widely."

This "general principle called the Law of Fossil Succession: The kinds of animals and plants found as fossils change through time. When we find the same kinds of fossils in rocks from different places, we know that the rocks are the same age."

There is a technical distinction between succession and sequence that is important to geologists: succession is any layers of rock in chronological order, while sequence is chronological and uninterrupted.

== See also ==
- Age of the Earth
- Carbon dating
- Evolution
- Geochronology
- Grand Canyon
- Igneous intrusion
- Inclusion (mineral)
- Smith's laws

== Bibliography ==
- Patrick Wyse Jackson, The Chronologers' Quest: The Search for the Age of the Earth, Cambridge University Press, 2006 ISBN 1139457578.
- Simon Winchester, The Map That Changed the World: William Smith and the Birth of Modern Geology, HarperCollins, 2009 ISBN 0061978272.
- William Smith, Strata Identified by Organized Fossils, London: W. Arding, 1816.
