= Deseado (crater) =

Crater on Mars

Deseado Crater
- Planet: Mars
- Region: Mare Australe quadrangle Dorsa Argentea Formation; Martian south pole region
- Coordinates: 80.62°S 70.29°E
- Quadrangle: Mare Australe
- Diameter: 27.8 km
- Eponym: Puerto Deseado, Argentina

Deseado Crater is a large Hesperian- or Amazonian-age impact crater in Promethei Planum near the south pole of Mars, within the Mare Australe quadrangle, due south of the Hellas impact basin. It is named for Puerto Deseado, Argentina. The crater contains a central topographic high interpreted to be an ice mound of probable Amazonian age. Despite the proximity of the ice mound to the southern polar ice sheet, it is not interpreted to have initially been a part of it. Deseado Crater features in the Mass Effect trilogy as the home of a structure constructed by a species called the Protheans to study the evolution of early humans.

== Context ==
Deseado Crater is a southern polar crater on Mars located in Promethei Planum near the Planum Australe plateau (at the south pole), south of the Hellas impact basin. The crater is cartographically situated within the Mare Australe quadrangle. It is located north of Chasma Australe and Australe Lingula, respectively a canyon and a lobate promontory of Planum Australe. The crater, which has a diameter of 27.8 km and a maximum depth of 1.44 km, is immediately adjacent to the edge of the Southern Polar Layered Deposit (SPLD), a geologic unit constituting Mars’ southern polar ice sheet interpreted to be alternating layers of dust and ice.

The crater is named for Puerto Deseado, a town in Argentina. The name was officially approved by the International Astronomical Union in 2006.

=== Popular culture ===
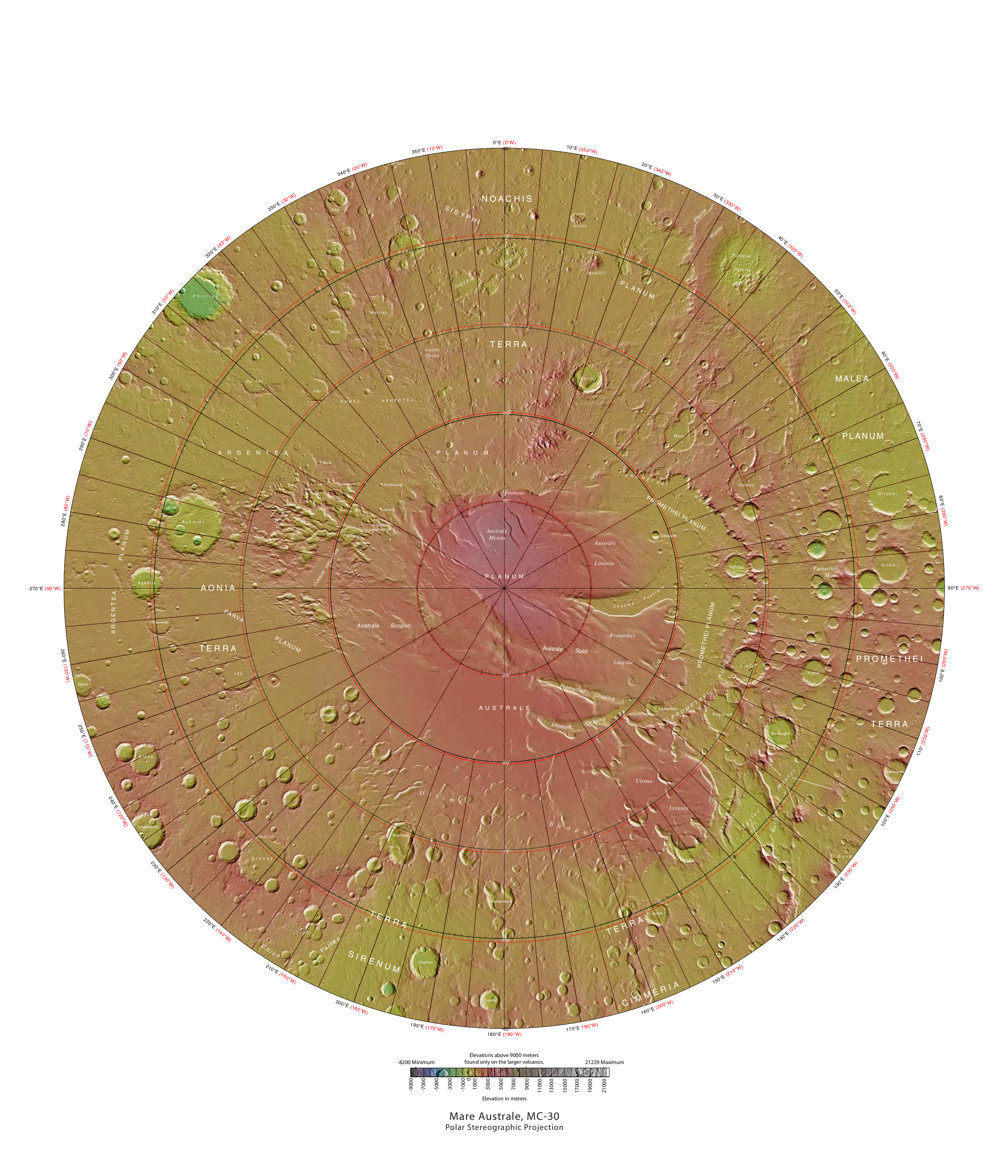
A MOLA hillshaded topographic map of the Mare Australe quadrangle as seen in an azimuthal projection. Deseado Crater is labeled in the upper-right section of the map extent, on the 80 degree latitude line near Australe Lingula. (click image for more detail)

Deseado Crater is referenced in the Mass Effect series as the location of an extraterrestrial installation operated by an ancient spacefaring species called the Protheans. The alien species used Deseado Crater as a base to observe the evolution of Cro-Magnon humans on Earth. Archives in the crater's base contained information that ultimately permitted humanity to develop faster-than-light travel.

== Geology ==
Deseado Crater was emplaced on a flat low-lying (possibly lava-formed) plain associated with the Dorsa Argentea Formation. It has been dated to the Hesperian or, more recently, to the Amazonian period by different researchers.

The center of Deseado Crater contains a central terraced dome that is hypothesized to be a large ice mound. This feature is separate from, but near to the periphery of, the main southern polar ice sheet. The feature was initially interpreted to represent an outlying extension of the main ice sheet and is likely to be much younger than the crater itself, perhaps of late Amazonian age. However, the lack of flow features in the impact basin suggests that the Deseado ice mound is probably an in situ feature rather than migrating material that was separated from the main ice sheet. The central ice mound is also biased to the west of the impact basin's true center, a common feature in ice-mound-bearing craters with high aspect ratios (diameter to depth). This asymmetry has been interpreted to be caused by the Coriolis effect, which deflects katabatic winds to the west in the Martian southern hemisphere.

Other than viscous flow features, the Deseado ice mound does not exhibit clear layering, edge ridges, stacked mounds, or sand dune seas. These other features have been reported in craters of similar morphologies.
