= Dorsa Argentea Formation =

The Dorsa Argentea Formation (DAF) is thought to be a large system of eskers that were under an ancient ice cap in the south polar region of Mars. The ancient ice cap was at least twice the size of the present ice cap and may have been 1500–2000 meters thick. Later research suggests that the area of this polar ice sheet is believed to have covered about 1.5 million square kilometers, roughly twice the size of France or the American state of Texas. This group of ridges extends from 270–100 E and 70–90 S, around the south pole of Mars. It sits under the Late Amazonian South Polar Layered Deposits (SPLD), in the Mare Australe quadrangle.

The combined length of these ridges is huge, one study studied seven different ridge systems which contained almost 4,000 ridges that had a total length 51,000 km. Most eskers are thought to be formed inside ice-walled tunnels by streams which flowed within and under glaciers. After the retaining ice walls melted away, stream deposits remained as long winding ridges.

Crater counts show that the ridges are of two different ages. One dates from Early Hesperian, while the other group dates to the Late Noachian. These dates correspond to the time when Mars had lakes and valley networks which formed from runoff, drainage and storage of liquid water on the surface of Mars. Later studies suggest the ice sheet formed near the boundary of the Noachian-Hesperian era and receded in the early Hesperian era.

The Dorsa Argentea Formation represents a time when there was melting and drainage of meltwater from a giant ice sheet around the Martian South Pole. Various mechanisms may have caused the ice to melt. Possible mechanisms may have been a warmer atmosphere, volcanism, or increased thickness of the ice cap from accumulating snow.

A thick ice sheet is more likely in the south polar region than in the north pole because the south pole is higher in altitude. Also, there may have been much more water available in the Martian atmosphere when the ice sheet developed.

A team of researchers used an early Mars global climate model together with the University of Maine Ice Sheet Model to determine how the eskers of the Dorsa Argentea Formation formed. They concluded that a greenhouse gas in addition to a thicker carbon dioxide atmosphere was needed to warm the surface enough. In addition, to produce the shape of the ice sheet, at least part of the Tharsis volcanoes needed to be present. In other words, Tharsis volcanoes came before the ice sheet.

MARSIS radar data suggest that significant areas of layered, potentially ice-rich parts of the Dorsa Argentea Formation remain today.

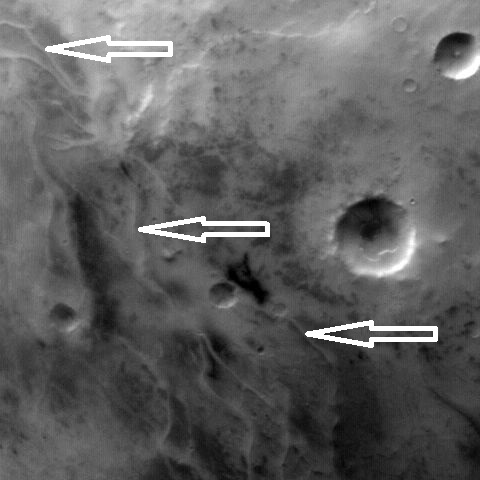
Ridges, believed to be eskers of the Dorsa Argentea Formation, as seen by Mars Global Surveyor wide angle MOC. White arrows point to the ridges.

Twenty-one mountains are associated with this formation. Their shapes suggest they are volcanoes and that most were associated with glaciers. Some probably erupted under a sheet of ice. Some resemble volcanic land forms called tuyas and tindars. These features are common in Iceland and Antarctica.

== See also ==
- Climate of Mars
- Glaciers on Mars
- Mars Global Surveyor
- Mars Orbiter Camera
- Martian polar ice caps
