= Hesperian =

Era of Mars' geologic history

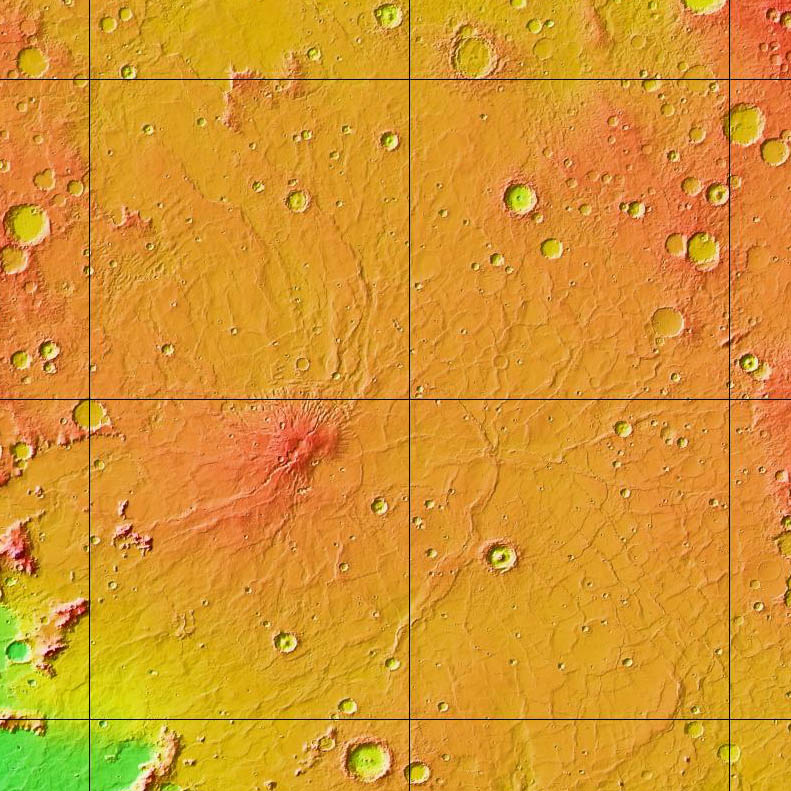
- MOLA colorized relief map of Hesperia Planum, the type area for the Hesperian System. Note that Hesperia Planum has fewer large impact craters than the surrounding Noachian terrain, indicating a younger age. Colors indicate elevation, with red highest, yellow intermediate, and green/blue lowest.

Chronology
- Subdivisions: Early Heperian; Late Hesperian

Usage information
- Celestial body: Mars
- Time scale(s) used: Martian Geologic Timescale

Definition
- Chronological unit: Period
- Stratigraphic unit: System
- Type section: Hesperia Planum

The Hesperian is a geologic system and time period on the planet Mars characterized by widespread volcanic activity and catastrophic flooding that carved immense outflow channels across the surface. The Hesperian is an intermediate and transitional period of Martian history. During the Hesperian, Mars changed from the wetter and perhaps warmer world of the Noachian to the dry, cold, and dusty planet seen today. The absolute age of the Hesperian Period is uncertain. The beginning of the period followed the end of the Late Heavy Bombardment and probably corresponds to the start of the lunar Late Imbrian period, around 3700 million years ago (Mya). The end of the Hesperian Period is much more uncertain and could range anywhere from 3200 to 2000 Mya, with 3000 Mya being frequently cited. The Hesperian Period is roughly coincident with the Earth's early Archean Eon.

With the decline of heavy impacts at the end of the Noachian, volcanism became the primary geologic process on Mars, producing vast plains of flood basalts and broad volcanic constructs (highland paterae). By Hesperian times, all of the large shield volcanoes on Mars, including Olympus Mons, had begun to form. Volcanic outgassing released large amounts of sulfur dioxide (SO_{2}) and hydrogen sulfide (H_{2}S) into the atmosphere, causing a transition in the style of weathering from dominantly phyllosilicate (clay) to sulfate mineralogy. Liquid water became more localized in extent and turned more acidic as it interacted with SO_{2} and H_{2}S to form sulfuric acid.

By the beginning of the Late Hesperian the atmosphere had probably thinned to its present density. As the planet cooled, groundwater stored in the upper crust (megaregolith) began to freeze, forming a thick cryosphere overlying a deeper zone of liquid water. Subsequent volcanic or tectonic activity occasionally fractured the cryosphere, releasing enormous quantities of deep groundwater to the surface and carving huge outflow channels. Much of this water flowed into the northern hemisphere where it probably pooled to form large transient lakes or an ice covered ocean.

== Description and name origin ==
The Hesperian System and Period is named after Hesperia Planum, a moderately cratered highland region northeast of the Hellas basin. The type area of the Hesperian System is in the Mare Tyrrhenum quadrangle (MC-22) around 20°S 245°W. The region consists of rolling, wind-streaked plains with abundant wrinkle ridges resembling those on the lunar maria. These "ridged plains" are interpreted to be basaltic lava flows (flood basalts) that erupted from fissures. The number-density of large impact craters is moderate, with about 125–200 craters greater than 5 km in diameter per million km^{2}. Hesperian-aged ridged plains cover roughly 30% of the Martian surface; they are most prominent in Hesperia Planum, Syrtis Major Planum, Lunae Planum, Malea Planum, and the Syria-Solis-Sinai Plana in southern Tharsis.

Martian time periods (millions of years ago)

== Hesperian chronology and stratigraphy ==
Schematic cross section of image at left. Surface units are interpreted as a sequence of layers (strata), with the youngest at top and oldest at bottom in accordance with the law of superposition.

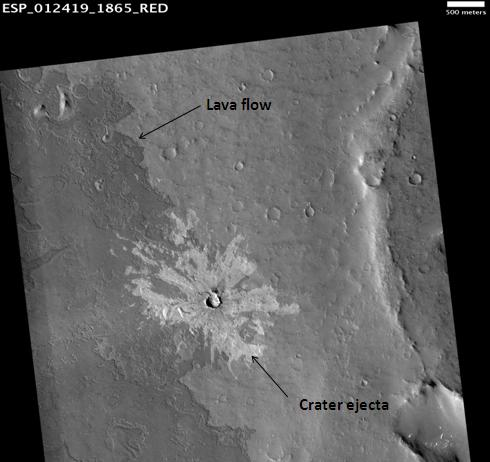
HiRISE image illustrating superpositioning, a principle that lets geologists determine the relative ages of surface units. The dark-toned lava flow overlies (is younger than) the light-toned, more heavily cratered terrain at right. The ejecta of the crater at center overlies both units, indicating that the crater is the youngest feature in the image. (See cross section, above right.)

Martian time periods are based on geological mapping of surface units from spacecraft images. A surface unit is a terrain with a distinct texture, color, albedo, spectral property, or set of landforms that distinguish it from other surface units and is large enough to be shown on a map. Mappers use a stratigraphic approach pioneered in the early 1960s for photogeologic studies of the Moon. Although based on surface characteristics, a surface unit is not the surface itself or group of landforms. It is an inferred geologic unit (e.g., formation) representing a sheetlike, wedgelike, or tabular body of rock that underlies the surface. A surface unit may be a crater ejecta deposit, lava flow, or any surface that can be represented in three dimensions as a discrete stratum bound above or below by adjacent units (illustrated right). Using principles such as superpositioning (illustrated left), cross-cutting relationships, and the relationship of impact crater density to age, geologists can place the units into a relative age sequence from oldest to youngest. Units of similar age are grouped globally into larger, time-stratigraphic (chronostratigraphic) units, called systems. For Mars, four systems are defined: the Pre-Noachian, Noachian, Hesperian, and Amazonian. Geologic units lying below (older than) the Noachian are informally designated Pre-Noachian. The geologic time (geochronologic) equivalent of the Hesperian System is the Hesperian Period. Rock or surface units of the Hesperian System were formed or deposited during the Hesperian Period.

=== System vs. period ===
e h Units in Earth geochronology and stratigraphy
Segments of rock (strata) in chronostratigraphy	Periods of time in geochronology	Notes (Mars)
Eonothem	Eon	not used for Mars
Erathem	Era	not used for Mars
System	Period	3 total; 10^{8} to 10^{9} years in length
Series	Epoch	8 total; 10^{7} to 10^{8} years in length
Stage	Age	not used for Mars
Chronozone	Chron	smaller than an age/stage; not used by the ICS timescale

System and period are not interchangeable terms in formal stratigraphic nomenclature, although they are frequently confused in popular literature. A system is an idealized stratigraphic column based on the physical rock record of a type area (type section) correlated with rocks sections from many different locations planetwide. A system is bound above and below by strata with distinctly different characteristics (on Earth, usually index fossils) that indicate dramatic (often abrupt) changes in the dominant fauna or environmental conditions. (See Cretaceous–Paleogene boundary as example.)

At any location, rock sections in a given system are apt to contain gaps (unconformities) analogous to missing pages from a book. In some places, rocks from the system are absent entirely due to nondeposition or later erosion. For example, rocks of the Cretaceous System are absent throughout much of the eastern central interior of the United States. However, the time interval of the Cretaceous (Cretaceous Period) still occurred there. Thus, a geologic period represents the time interval over which the strata of a system were deposited, including any unknown amounts of time present in gaps. Periods are measured in years, determined by radioactive dating. On Mars, radiometric ages are not available except from Martian meteorites whose provenance and stratigraphic context are unknown. Instead, absolute ages on Mars are determined by impact crater density, which is heavily dependent upon models of crater formation over time. Accordingly, the beginning and end dates for Martian periods are uncertain, especially for the Hesperian/Amazonian boundary, which may be in error by a factor of 2 or 3.

=== Boundaries and subdivisions ===
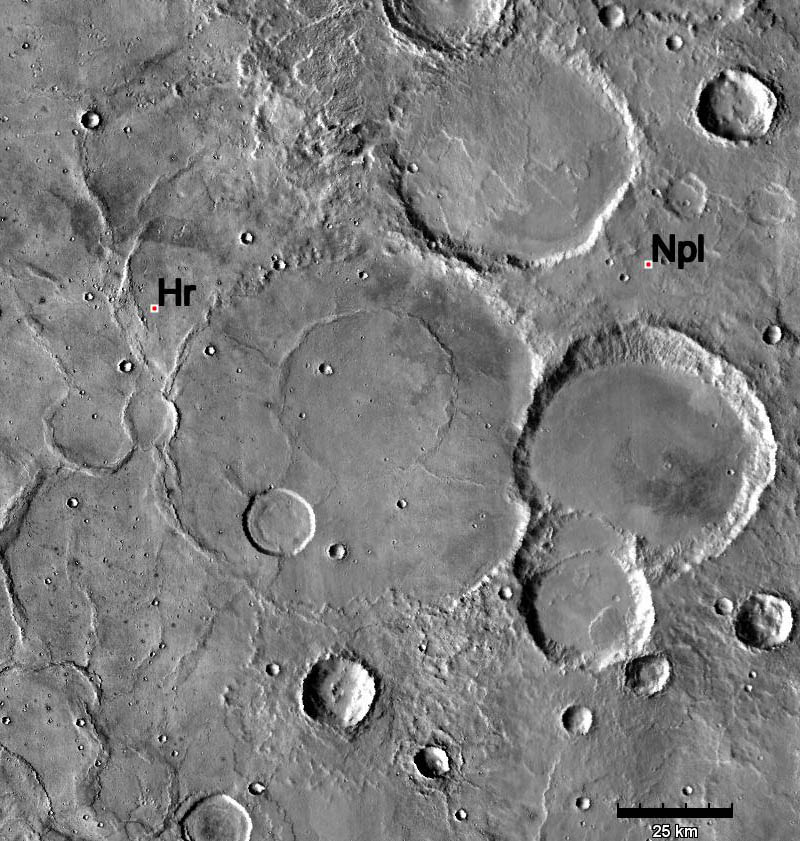
Geologic contact of Noachian and Hesperian Systems. Hesperian ridged plains (Hr) embay and overlie older Noachian cratered plateau materials (Npl). The ridged plains partially bury many of the old Noachian-aged craters. Image is THEMIS IR mosaic, based on similar Viking photo shown in Tanaka et al. (1992), Fig. 1a, p. 352.

Approximate geologic contact of Upper Hesperian lava apron from Alba Mons (H_{al}) with Lower Amazonian Vastitas Borealis Formation (A_{vb}). Image is MOLA topographic map adapted from Ivanov and Head (2006), Figs. 1, 3, and 8.

The lower boundary of the Hesperian System is defined as the base of the ridged plains, which are typified by Hesperia Planum and cover about a third of the planet's surface. In eastern Hesperia Planum, the ridged plains overlie early to mid Noachian aged cratered plateau materials (pictured left). The Hesperian's upper boundary is more complex and has been redefined several times based on increasingly detailed geological mapping. Currently, the stratigraphic boundary of the Hesperian with the younger Amazonian System is defined as the base of the Vastitas Borealis Formation (pictured right). The Vastitas Borealis is a vast, low-lying plain that covers much of the northern hemisphere of Mars. It is generally interpreted to consist of reworked sediments originating from the Late Hesperian outflow channels and may be the remnant of an ocean that covered the northern lowland basins. Another interpretation of the Vastitas Borealis Formation is that it consists of lava flows.

The Hesperian System is subdivided into two chronostratigraphic series: Lower Hesperian and Upper Hesperian. The series are based on referents or locations on the planet where surface units indicate a distinctive geological episode, recognizable in time by cratering age and stratigraphic position. For example, Hesperia Planum is the referent location for the Lower Hesperian Series. The corresponding geologic time (geochronological) units of the two Hesperian series are the Early Hesperian and Late Hesperian Epochs. An epoch is a subdivision of a period; the two terms are not synonymous in formal stratigraphy. The age of the Early Hepserian/Late Hesperian boundary is uncertain, ranging from 3600 to 3200 million years ago based on crater counts. The average of the range is shown in the timeline below.

Hesperian Epochs (Millions of Years Ago)

Stratigraphic terms are typically confusing to geologists and non-geologists alike. One way to sort through the difficulty is by the following example: One could easily go to Cincinnati, Ohio and visit a rock outcrop in the Upper Ordovician Series of the Ordovician System. You could even collect a fossil trilobite there. However, you could not visit the Late Ordovician Epoch in the Ordovician Period and collect an actual trilobite.

The Earth-based scheme of rigid stratigraphic nomenclature has been successfully applied to Mars for several decades now but has numerous flaws. The scheme will no doubt become refined or replaced as more and better data become available. (See mineralogical timeline below as example of alternative.) Obtaining radiometric ages on samples from identified surface units is clearly necessary for a more complete understanding of Martian chronology.

== Mars during the Hesperian Period ==
Viking orbiter view of Hesperian-aged surface in Terra Meridiani. The small impact craters date back to the Hesperian Period and appear crisp despite their great age. This image indicates that erosion on Mars has been very slow since the end of the Noachian. Image is 17 km across and based on Carr, 1996, p. 134, Fig. 6-8.

The Hesperian was a time of declining rates of impact cratering, intense and widespread volcanic activity, and catastrophic flooding. Many of the major tectonic features on Mars formed at this time. The weight of the immense Tharsis Bulge stressed the crust to produce a vast network of extensional fractures (fossae) and compressive deformational features (wrinkle ridges) throughout the western hemisphere. The huge equatorial canyon system of Valles Marineris formed during the Hesperian as a result of these stresses. Sulfuric-acid weathering at the surface produced an abundance of sulfate minerals that precipitated in evaporitic environments, which became widespread as the planet grew increasingly arid. The Hesperian Period was also a time when the earliest evidence of glacial activity and ice-related processes appears in the Martian geologic record.

=== Impact cratering ===
As originally conceived, the Hesperian System referred to the oldest surfaces on Mars that postdate the end of heavy bombardment. The Hesperian was thus a time period of rapidly declining impact cratering rates. However, the timing and rate of the decline are uncertain. The lunar cratering record suggests that the rate of impacts in the inner Solar System during the Noachian (4000 million years ago) was 500 times higher than today. Planetary scientists still debate whether these high rates represent the tail end of planetary accretion or a late cataclysmic pulse that followed a more quiescent period of impact activity. Nevertheless, at the beginning of the Hesperian, the impact rate had probably declined to about 80 times greater than present rates, and by the end of the Hesperian, some 700 million years later, the rate began to resemble that seen today.

== Bibliography and recommended reading ==
- Boyce, Joseph M. (2008). The Smithsonian Book of Mars. Old Saybrook, CT: Konecky & Konecky. ISBN 978-1-58834-074-0.
- Carr, Michael H. (2006). The Surface of Mars. Cambridge, UK: Cambridge University Press. ISBN 978-0-521-87201-0.
- Hartmann, William K. (2003). A Traveler's Guide to Mars: The Mysterious Landscapes of the Red Planet. New York: Workman. ISBN 0-7611-2606-6.
- Morton, Oliver (2003). Mapping Mars: Science, Imagination, and the Birth of a World. New York: Picador. ISBN 0-312-42261-X.
