= Deseado (yacht) =

10 m sloop rigged yacht

Deseado (Spanish for "wished" or "wished for") is a 10 m sloop rigged yacht that survived about a month in the Southern Ocean and Bass Strait after being abandoned in stormy seas off Tasmania, the southern island state of Australia. It was found off the south coast of New South Wales where it was towed into Batemans Bay on 23 May 2006.

A Tasmanian Police Kawasaki BK 117 rescue/Emergency medical services helicopter had earlier rescued the owner-yachtsman in 8 m waves on 16 April 2006 (Easter day), after he set off his EPIRB (radio beacon). The owner, Bruce Wilson, was sailing single-handed from Tasmania to New Zealand when the yacht was damaged and he suffered neck injuries. The yacht was then about 130 nautical miles (240 km) north-north-east of Bicheno. The yacht was abandoned and given it up as lost.

The yacht was recovered near the coast of New South Wales by Batemans Bay coast patrol. The owner recovered the yacht and sailed it back to Hobart, Tasmania.
