= Smith's laws =

In geology, Smith's laws are two rules, formulated by William Smith (1769–1839), which aid in the determination of geological succession. They are fundamental to the production of geological maps.

== The laws ==
Both laws were first published by Smith in Strata Identified by Fossils, 1816–1819.

=== Smith's first law ===
Smith's first law is the Principle of Superposition. This states that newer rock beds will lie on top of older rock beds unless the succession has been overturned. Overturning of the beds causes the succession order to be reversed. This can be caused by folding that is so severe that the beds are moved past the perpendicular. Beds can also be put out of order by an overthrust thrust fault (Jackson, p. 128).

=== Smith's second law ===
Smith's second law is the Law of Strata identified by fossils. This states that each stratum in the succession contains a distinctive set of fossils. This law allows beds to be identified as belonging to the same stratum even when the horizon between them is not continuous (Jackson, p. 128).

== Geological mapping ==
Smith used these new techniques, together with knowledge he had accumulated as a canal engineer and mineral surveyor, to produce geological maps. He started with a hand-produced map of the area around Bath in 1799. In 1815 he published a large-scale map of England, Wales and parts of Scotland. This was the first geological map of Britain (indeed, of any country) and a major milestone in geology (Winchester, p. 195; Jackson, p. 127). In 1819, Smith produced cross-sectional maps showing the underlying geology (Jackson, p. 128).

Smith's map of England and Wales was extensively plagiarised by others, starting with George Bellas Greenough in 1819 (Winchester, pp. 230-234). Smith's laws are still basic to the production of modern geological maps (Jackson, p. 128).

== Bibliography ==
- Patrick Wyse Jackson, The Chronologers' Quest: The Search for the Age of the Earth, Cambridge University Press, 2006 ISBN 1139457578.
- Simon Winchester, The Map That Changed the World: William Smith and the Birth of Modern Geology, HarperCollins, 2009 ISBN 0061978272.
- William Smith, Strata Identified by Organized Fossils, London: W. Arding, 1816.
