= Noachis Terra =

Landmass of southern Mars

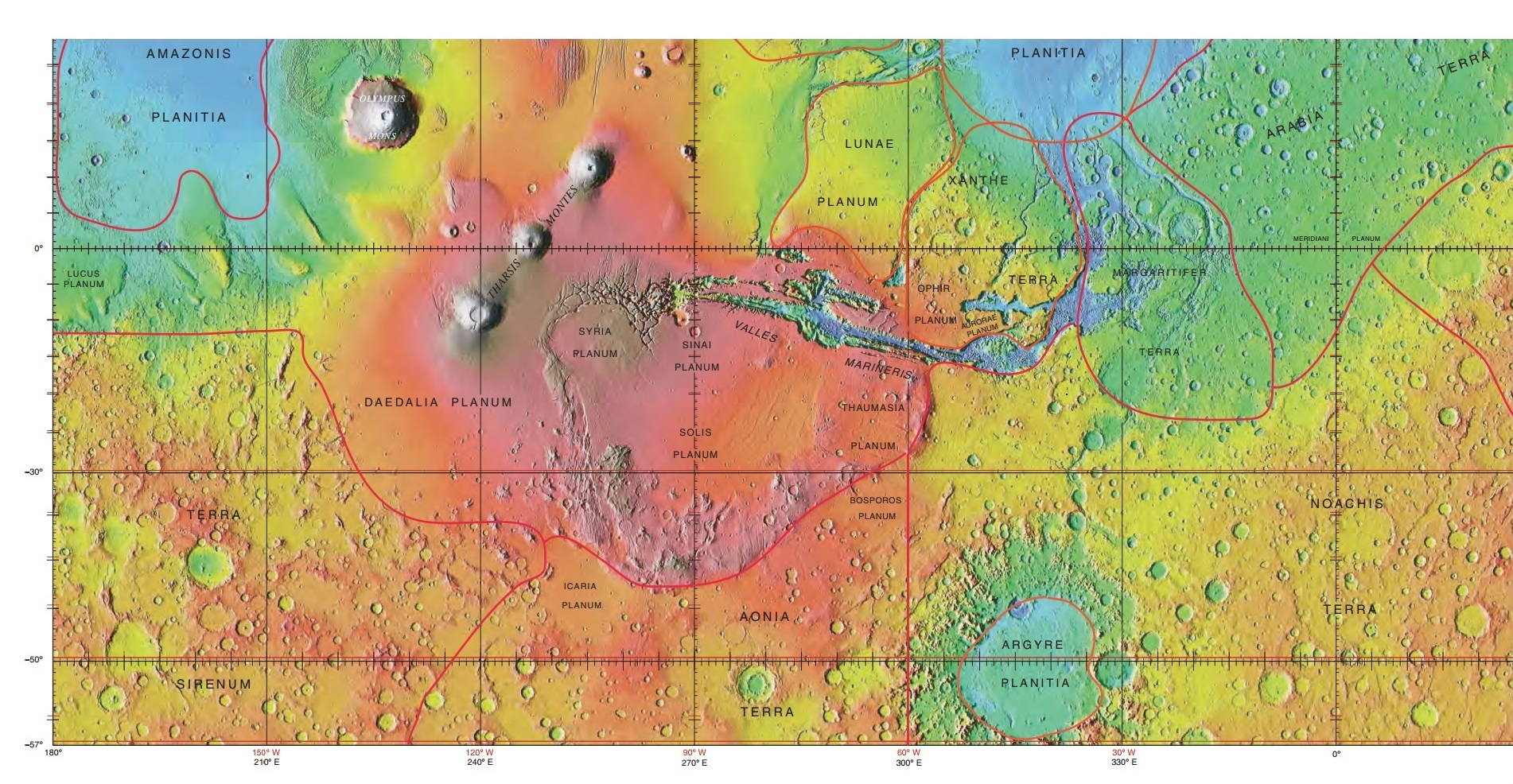
MOLA map showing boundaries with other regions

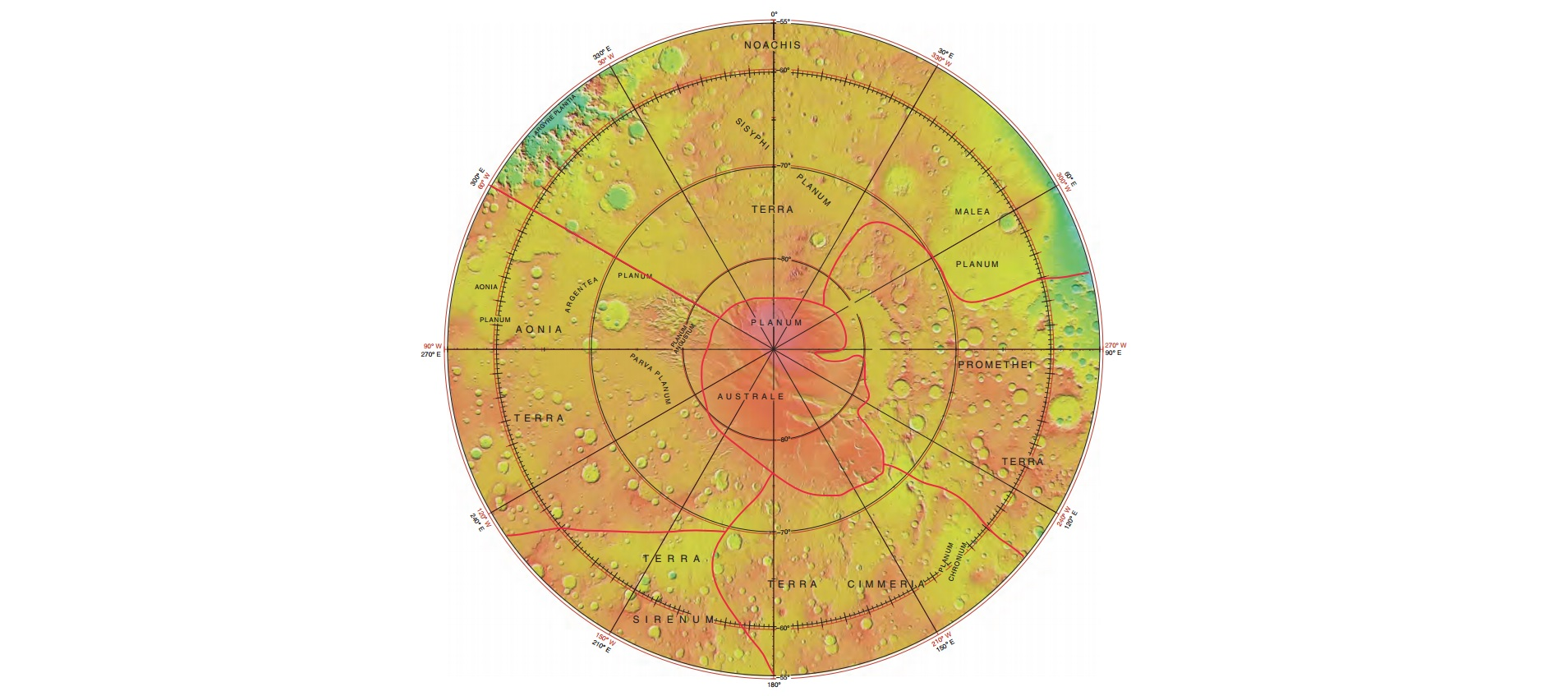
MOLA map showing boundaries with other regions around the south pole of Mars

Noachis Terra (/ˈnoʊəkɪs/; lit. "Land of Noah") is an extensive southern landmass (terra) of the planet Mars. It lies west of the giant Hellas impact basin, roughly between the latitudes −20° and −80° and longitudes 30° west and 30° east, centered on 45°S 350°E. It is in the Noachis quadrangle.

The term "Noachian epoch" is derived from this region.
