= Law of superposition =

Law stating that newer strata stack above older ones

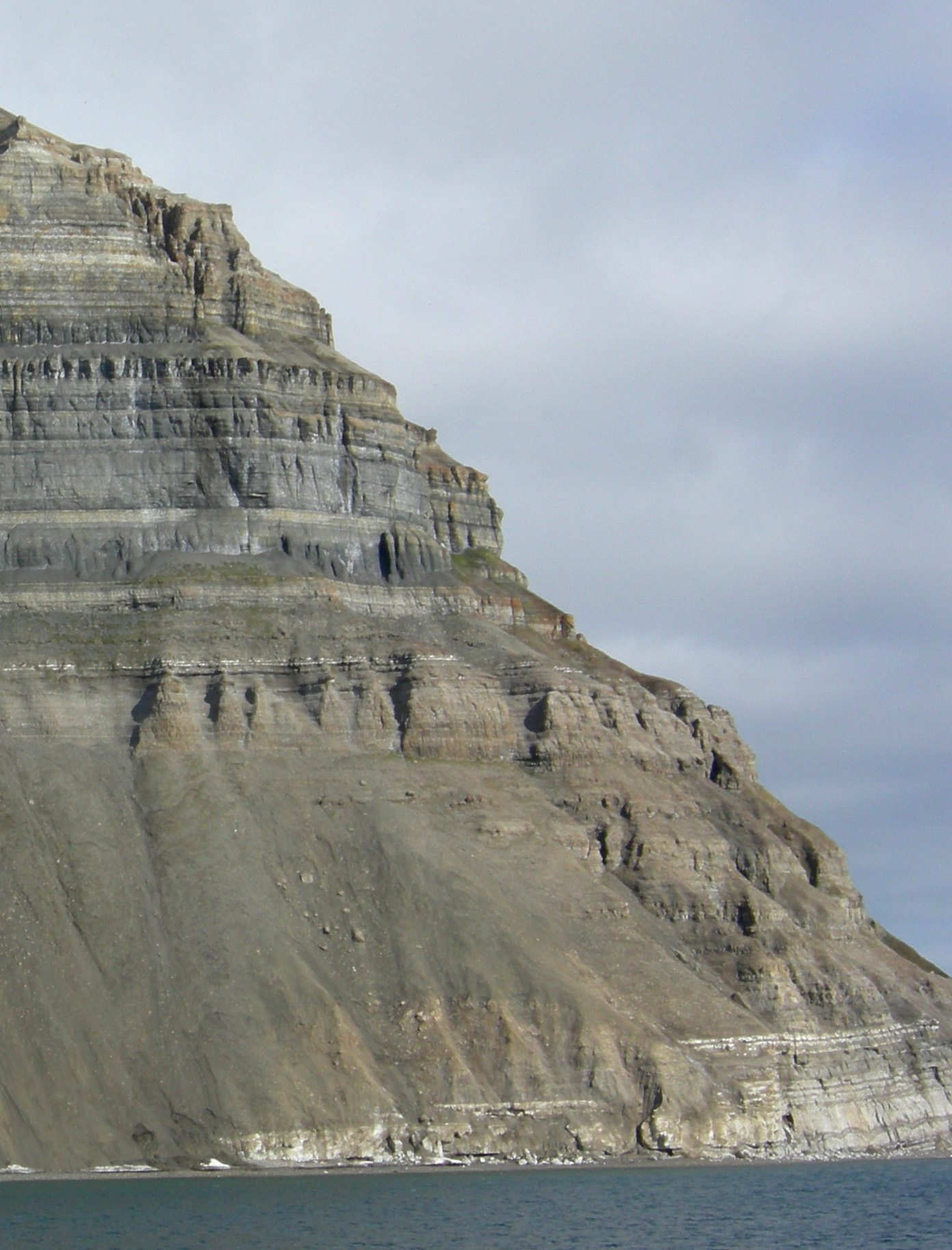
Layer upon layer of rocks on north shore of Isfjord (Svalbard), Norway. Since there is no overturning, the rock at the bottom is older than the rock on the top by the law of superposition.

The law of superposition is a principle that forms one of the bases of the sciences of geology, paleontology, and other fields pertaining to geological stratigraphy. In its plainest form, it states that in undeformed stratigraphic sequences, the oldest strata will lie at the bottom of the sequence, while newer material stacks upon the surface to form new deposits over time. This is paramount to stratigraphic dating, which requires a set of assumptions, including that the law of superposition holds true and that an object cannot be older than the materials of which it is composed. To illustrate the practical applications of superposition in scientific inquiry, sedimentary rock that has not been deformed by more than 90° will exhibit the oldest layers on the bottom, thus enabling paleontologists and paleobotanists to identify the relative ages of any fossils found within the strata, with the remains of the most archaic lifeforms confined to the lowest. These findings can inform the community on the fossil record covering the relevant strata, to determine which species coexisted temporally and which species existed successively in perhaps an evolutionarily or phylogenetically relevant way.

== History ==
The law of superposition was first proposed in 1669 by the Danish scientist Nicolas Steno, and is present as one of his major theses in the groundbreaking seminal work Dissertationis prodromus (1669).

In the English-language literature, the law was popularized by William "Strata" Smith, who used it to produce the first geologic map of Britain. It is the first of Smith's laws, which were formally published in Strata Identified by Fossils (1816–1819).

== Archaeological considerations ==
Superposition in archaeology and especially in stratification use during excavation is slightly different as the processes involved in laying down archaeological strata are somewhat different from geological processes. Human-made intrusions and activity in the archaeological record need not form chronologically from top to bottom or be deformed from the horizontal as natural strata are by equivalent processes. Some archaeological strata (often termed as contexts or layers) are created by undercutting previous strata. An example would be that the silt back-fill of an underground drain would form some time after the ground immediately above it. Other examples of non vertical superposition would be modifications to standing structures such as the creation of new doors and windows in a wall. Superposition in archaeology requires a degree of interpretation to correctly identify chronological sequences and in this sense superposition in archaeology is more dynamic and multi-dimensional.

== Other limitations to stratification and superposition ==
Original stratification induced by natural processes can subsequently be disrupted or permutated by a number of factors, including animal interference and vegetation, as well as limestone crystallization.

Stratification behaves in a different manner with surface-formed igneous depositions, such as lava flows and ash falls, and thus superposition may not always successfully apply under certain conditions.

== See also ==
- Harris matrix
- Principle of cross-cutting relationships
- Principle of faunal succession
- Principle of lateral continuity
- Principle of original horizontality
- Stratification (archeology)
- Stratigraphy
- Structural geology
