= Saxe–Goldstein hypothesis =

Archaeological theory

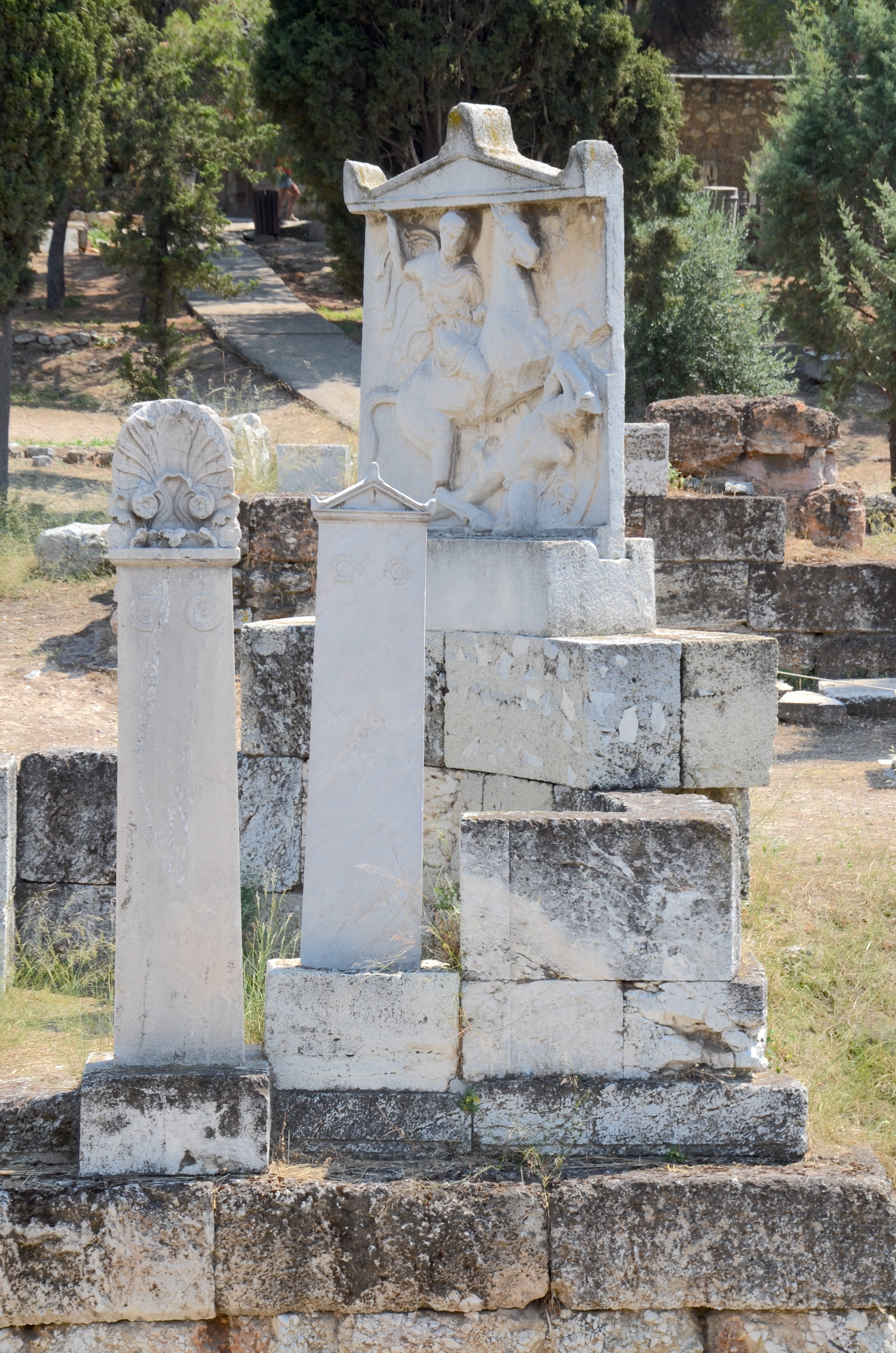
Replicas of ancient tombstones in the Kerameikos cemetery, Athens, including the Stele of Dexileos

In archaeology, the Saxe–Goldstein hypothesis (Note: A broader, similar hypothesis, that mortuary treatment bears some predictable relationship to both the deceased individual's status in life and the organization of their society, is known as the Saxe–Binford hypothesis.) is a prediction about the relationship between a society's funerary practices and its social organization. It predicts a correlation between two phenomena: the use of specific areas to dispose of the dead, and the legitimation of control over restricted resources through claims of descent from dead ancestors. The hypothesis was first formulated by the American anthropologist Arthur Saxe in 1970, as the last in a series of eight, and was refined by Lynne Goldstein later in the 1970s. In reference to its origin, it is sometimes known as Hypothesis Eight.

Saxe's work drew on the ethnographic work of Mervyn Meggitt and the role theory developed by Ward Goodenough. He predicted that, if a society contained groups of people with a shared identity (known as "corporate groups") that legitimized their claims to important, restricted resources by claiming ties to ancestors, that society would be more likely to use formal areas, such as cemeteries, for the disposal of the dead. (Note: Other types of formal disposal area include specific locations used for sky burial, such as the Zoroastrian Towers of Silence.) Conversely, societies using such areas would be more likely to contain such corporate groups. His work coincided with that of Lewis Binford, who argued that funerary practices provided useful evidence for social organization and for the status of the deceased in life. Studying the treatment of the dead to investigate these areas came to be known as the Saxe–Binford program. Lynne Goldstein modified the hypothesis to stipulate that formal disposal areas were only one possible means of claiming ties to ancestors, and therefore that the lack of such areas need not imply the lack of corporate groups using those ties to compete over resources. As a result, it became known as the Saxe–Goldstein hypothesis.

The Saxe–Goldstein hypothesis was credited with revitalizing interest in funerary archaeology. It was widely adopted, particularly by adherents of processual archaeology, a body of theory that sought to bring archaeology closer to the natural sciences. In the 1980s and 1990s, it was applied to (among others) the distribution of megalithic tombs in the European Stone Age, to prehistoric Aboriginal burial grounds near Australia's Murray River, and to the different levels of state control over cemeteries in classical Athens and ancient Rome. Within the processual movement, the hypothesis was criticized for failing to account for practices that do not leave traces in the archaeological record. It was also criticized by post-processual archaeologists, such as Ian Hodder, who viewed it as ignoring the beliefs, motivations and competing interests of those responsible for disposing of the dead. By the twenty-first century, explicit use of the hypothesis was considered a minority pursuit. However, it was also described as part of the "theoretical unconscious" of Neolithic archaeologists by James Whitley in 2002, and as part of "the realm of archaeological common sense" by Robert Rosenswig, Margaret Briggs, and Marilyn Masson in 2020.

== Background ==
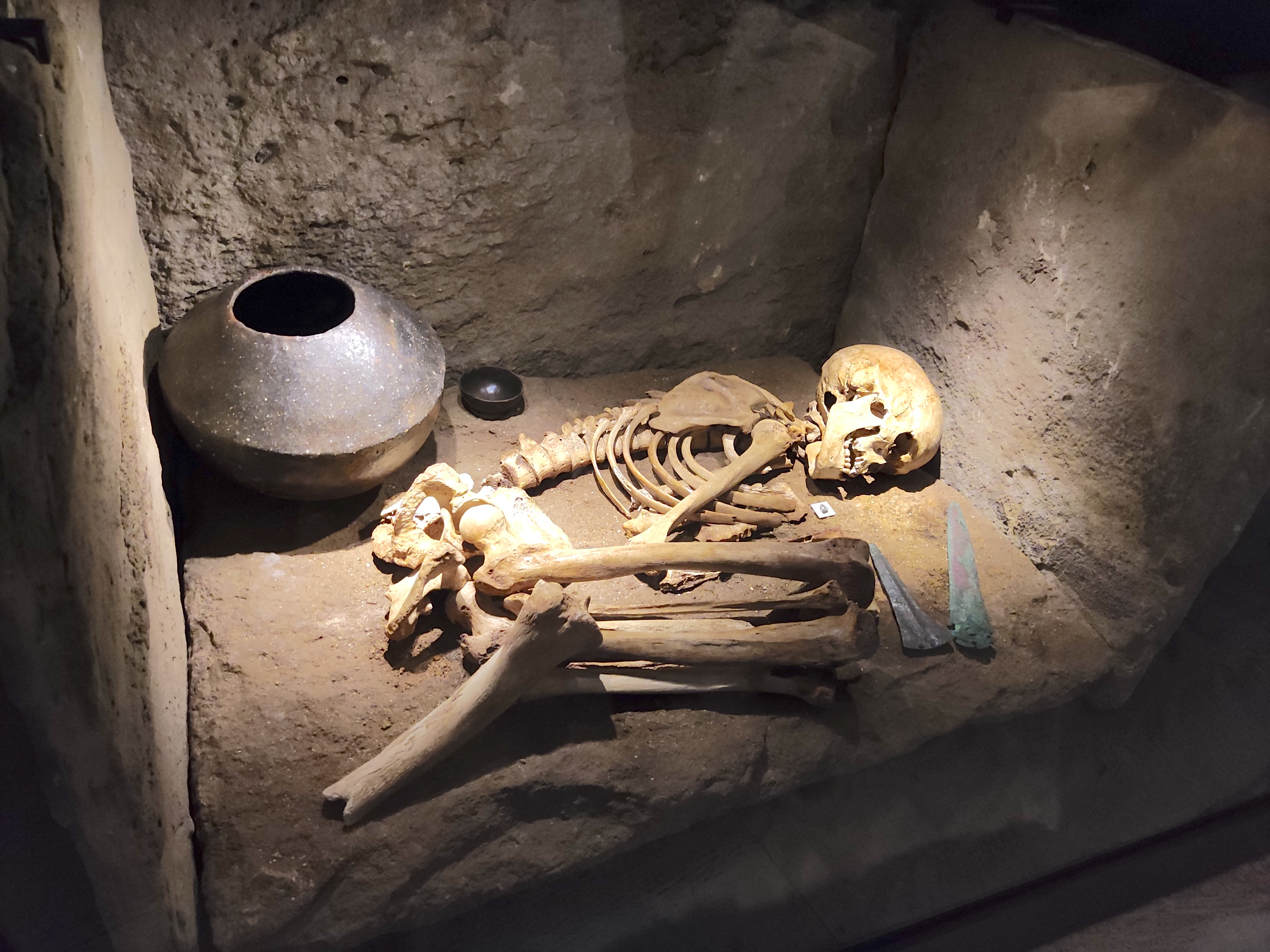
A burial with grave goods at Las Herrerías in Spain, from the Argaric culture of the Early Bronze Age

In the 1970s and 1980s, the American archaeologist Lewis Binford was a leading figure in the theoretical movement known as the "New Archaeology" (later called processual archaeology). In a 1962 article, Binford had called on archaeologists to make greater use of observations of living societies made by anthropologists as analogies for how societies may have operated in the past. He adapted an earlier comment by the archaeologists Gordon Willey and Philip Phillips to write that "archaeology is anthropology or it is nothing".

In a 1971 article titled "Mortuary Practices: Their Study and Their Potential", Binford argued that funerary practices reflect the social organization of the people who carry them out. This conflicted with the cultural diffusionist or culture-historical model then prevalent in archaeology, which instead saw them as determined by the ancestry of the cultural groups performing them, or by cultural exchange between different groups. Binford set out to test the degree to which a society's treatment of the dead ("mortuary practices") reflected the deceased individuals' social status and the whole society's level of social complexity. He predicted that simpler societies would have fewer criteria on which to mark out individuals in death (that is, they would "show fewer dimensions of differentiation"), while more complex societies would have more such criteria. From a study of 40 societies, he concluded that more complex societies indeed showed more degrees of differentiation in their funerary rituals between different individuals, and that they marked that differentiation in more abstract ways. He also considered that mortuary differentiation according to age correlated negatively with the level of hereditary inequality in a society.

== Saxe's formulation of the hypothesis ==
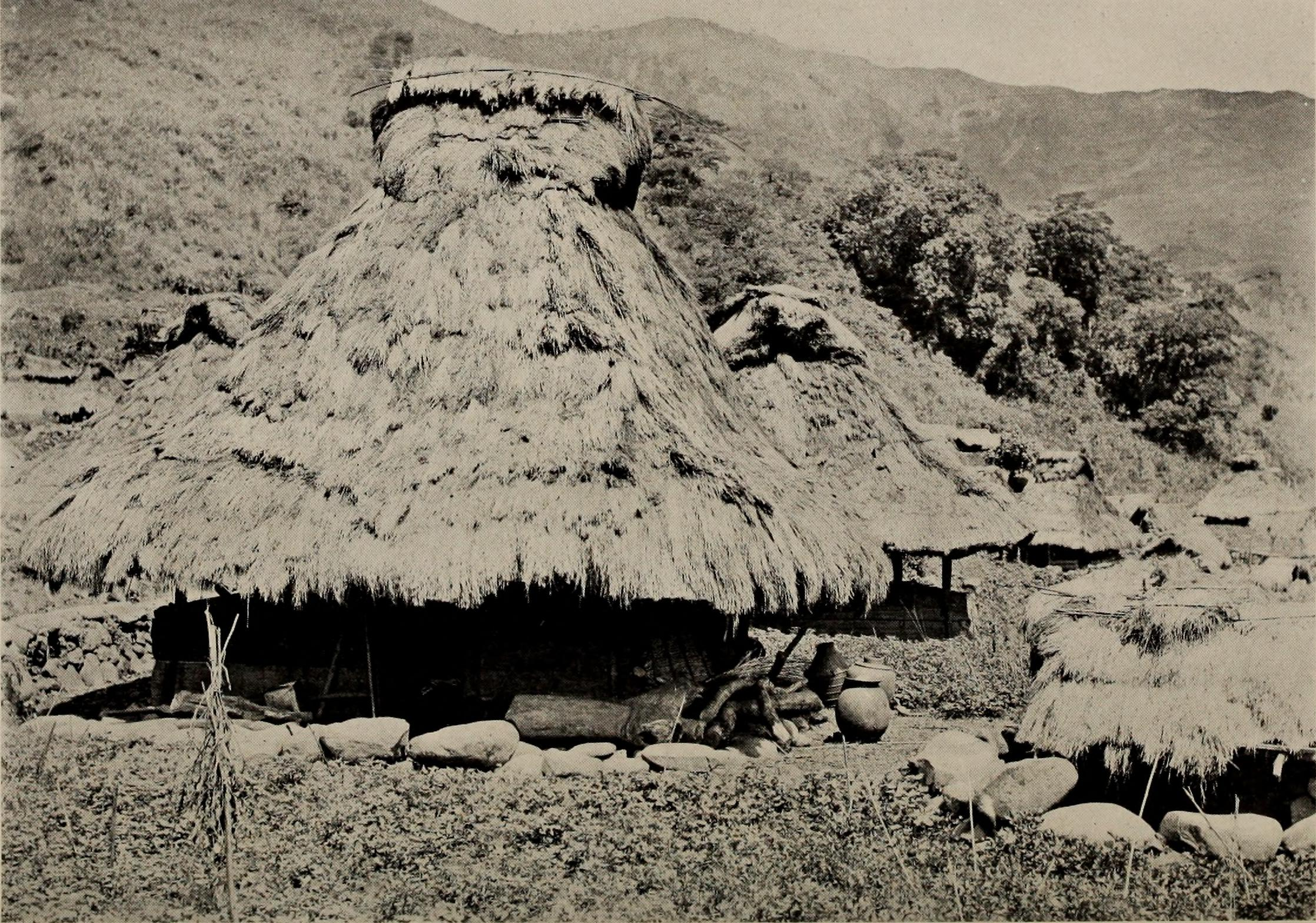
A Bontoc house on the island of Luzon in the Philippines, 1903

The anthropologist Arthur Saxe, then a graduate student at the University of Michigan, (Note: Parker Pearson 2009, p. 29. The thesis is Saxe 1970.) proposed Hypothesis Eight in his 1970 doctoral dissertation. (Note: Parker Pearson 2009, p. 29. The thesis is Saxe 1970.) It was developed from the work of Mervyn Meggitt, who had made anthropological observations of the Mae Enga people of Papua New Guinea between 1933 and the early 1960s. He had concluded that, in Mae Enga society, claims of descent from the ancestors who had once settled a piece of land were used to determine who legitimately owned it. Saxe's work was further based on the role theory developed by Ward Goodenough in the 1960s, which interpreted acts in everyday life as acting out socially defined roles and categories. The archaeologist and philologist Matthew Suriano has also suggested that Saxe was inspired by the work of Fustel de Coulanges, a nineteenth-century historian who connected funerary practices with the growth of property rights in ancient cities.

In his dissertation, Saxe proposed eight hypotheses concerning the relationship between mortuary practices and the social structure of the society that uses them. The eighth argues that a society's use of formal areas to dispose of the dead, such as cemeteries, correlates with certain other cultural features. Specifically, it focuses on corporate groups (groups of people sharing a common identity), which legitimize their claims to restricted resources by claiming ties to ancestors. According to the hypothesis, societies with these corporate groups are more likely to use such areas; conversely, societies using such areas are more likely to contain corporate groups using ancestral ties in this way. In Saxe's phrasing:

To the degree that corporate group rights to use and/or control crucial but restricted resources are attained and/or legitimized by means of lineal descent from the dead (i.e. lineal ties to ancestors), such groups will maintain formal disposal areas for the exclusive disposal of their dead, and conversely.

Saxe considered the hypothesis supported by the cases he studied – the Kapauku, Asante, and Bontoc peoples, respectively of Central Papua, Ghana, and Luzon – but to require further testing on a larger sample.

As applied to past societies, the hypothesis is an example of middle-range theory, in that it attempts to draw general conclusions about the relationship between the archaeological record and the people who produced it. (Note: Brown 1981, p. 36. On the origins and use of the term "middle-range theory", see Raab & Goodyear 1984, p. 260.) It is within the tradition of processual archaeology, a movement begun in the 1960s which aimed to model archaeology on the scientific method of the natural sciences. Processual archaeology emphasized the development and testing of hypotheses about general laws of human behavior. (Note: Earle & Preucel 1987, p. 501. On processual archaeology, see Zubrow 2024.) In this respect, it was part of the larger positivist school of thought, in which knowledge is considered to be based upon observable ("empirical") facts, which can themselves be predicted from consistent rules, laws and patterns. The belief that an individual's treatment in death can be used to infer information about both their status in life and the organization of their society has been termed the "Saxe–Binford program" or "Saxe–Binford hypothesis". (Note: Curtin 2017, p. 2 (program); Rosenswig, Briggs & Masson 2020, p. 2 (hypothesis).) (Note: The use of the latter terms often overlaps with "Saxe–Goldstein hypothesis", and covers a variable range of ideas proposed by Saxe, Binford and Goldstein.) The archaeologist Robert Chapman has characterized the work of both Saxe and Binford in this area as "exploratory rather than ... fully theorized [or] theoretical".

== Development by Lynne Goldstein ==
Saxe's eighth hypothesis was widely adopted and developed by processual archaeologists during the 1970s. Joseph Tainter used it in a study of a cemetery at Kaloko in Hawaii, where the community was made up of the inhabitants of four residential units. He argued, based on the hypothesis, that the unified nature of the cemetery reflected a unified identity shared between the inhabitants of different units. Lynne Goldstein, then a doctoral student in archaeology at Northwestern University, wrote her own thesis on the hypothesis, reanalyzing Saxe's data and producing a study of 30 societies in relation to Hypothesis Eight. (Note: Morris 1991, p. 148. Goldstein's (unpublished) thesis is Goldstein 1976.) In a 1981 chapter, Goldstein agreed with Saxe that formal disposal areas for the dead generally occur in societies with social structures organized around lineal descent. However, she further argued, against Saxe, that maintaining such areas was not an essential part of expressing these social structures.

Goldstein reframed Saxe's single hypothesis as three related sub-hypotheses. Her reformulation made Hypothesis Eight a one-way argument: while formal disposal areas could be taken as evidence that corporate groups used claims of ancestry to claim control of restricted resources, it did not follow that a society that included such groups would always institute such disposal areas. Instead, different cultures may have different ways of legitimizing ancestral claims to resources, including through non-funerary symbols and rituals. Goldstein's formulation largely displaced that of Saxe, with the result that the overall idea became generally known as the Saxe–Goldstein hypothesis.

Goldstein first hypothesised that corporate groups making claims based on ties to ancestors would express these through regular religious or ritual acts. She stated that these acts would be more prominent in societies where claims based on ancestors were more important, and that one form of such acts could be to maintain formal disposal areas:

To the degree that corporate group rights to use and/or control crucial but restricted resources are attained and/or legitimized by lineal descent from the dead (i.e. lineal ties to ancestors), such groups will, by the popular religion and its ritualization, regularly reaffirm the lineal corporate group and its rights. One means of ritualization is the maintenance of a permanent, specialized, bounded area for the exclusive disposal of their dead.

She then argued that the existence of such formal disposal areas could be taken as evidence for corporate groups making these kinds of claims, either based on biological ancestry or traditions of inheritance:

If a permanent, specialized, bounded area for the exclusive disposal of the group's dead exists, then it is likely that this represents a corporate group that has rights over the use and/or control of crucial but restricted resources. This corporate control is most likely to be attained and/or legitimized by means of lineal descent from the dead, either in terms of an actual lineage or in the form of a strong, established tradition of the critical resource passing from parent to offspring.

Finally, she argued that researchers could be more confident in linking formal disposal areas with claims based on ancestors if those disposal areas were more rigorously defined and organized:

The more structured and formal the disposal area, the fewer alternative explanations of social organization apply, and conversely.

Having assessed these sub-hypotheses against the Mississippian societies studied in her doctoral research, Goldstein concluded that:

If there is a formal bounded disposal area, used exclusively for the dead, then the culture is probably one which has a corporate group structure in the form of a lineal descent system. The more organized and formal the disposal area is, the more conclusive this interpretation.

== Application ==
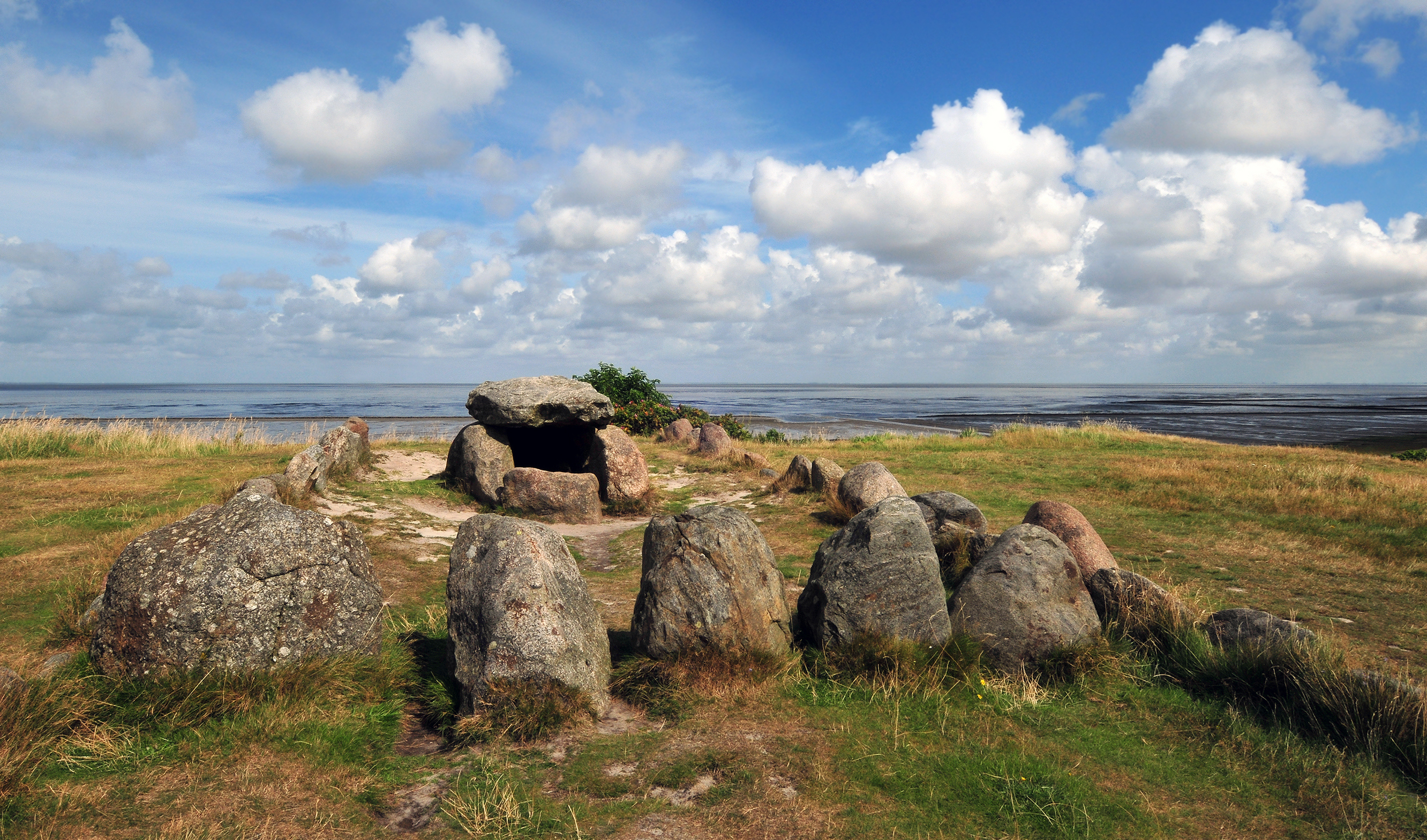
A megalithic tomb, Harhoog, in Keitum on the island of Sylt, constructed c. 3000 BCE

In collaboration with L. P. Gall, Saxe studied itinerant swidden farmers in Malaysia who had been forced to move into permanent villages. (Note: Swidden farming is a form of slash-and-burn agriculture in which an area of forest is destroyed to create a field, known as a swidden, which is abandoned once the soil's nutrients are exhausted.) In a 1977 publication of this study, Saxe and Gall noted that these farmers subsequently shifted toward burying their dead in formal cemeteries, and took this as evidence for Hypothesis Eight. (Note: Saxe & Gall 1977, cited in Brown 1995, p. 14.) Robert Chapman, in 1981, argued that the Saxe–Goldstein hypothesis could be used to explain the distribution of megalithic tombs in prehistoric Europe. In 1982, Maurice Bloch made a study of the Merina people of Madagascar, for whom he concluded that "the notion of ancestral land, that is land belonging to the deme [community], is totally merged with the notion of ancestors. The ancestors had lived and were buried in the ancestral land; the land, in the form of terraces, had been made by the ancestors". The anthropologist James A. Brown considers this reinforcing evidence for the Saxe–Goldstein hypothesis. (Note: Bloch 1982, p. 211, cited in Brown 1995, p. 14.)

In 1981, Brown described the methods of Saxe and Binford as a means of applying to material culture the social theories of Morton Fried and Elman Service, who studied the development and evolution of socio-political organization. In 1984, Jack Glazier made a study of the Mbeere people of Kenya, who traditionally disposed of corpses with little ritual until a 1930 government decree mandated the burial of the dead. Glazier concluded that, after the Mbeere were forced to use fixed cemeteries, those cemeteries began to be used to legitimize claims of hereditary control over the land around them. This conclusion has been cited as evidence in support of the Saxe–Goldstein hypothesis. Subsequent studies used the hypothesis as part of an explanation of the links between funerary practices and social structure. In 1988, Colin Pardoe applied it to prehistoric Aboriginal burial grounds in southeastern Australia, interpreting these burial grounds as a means of legitimizing control over territory near the Murray River.

The hypothesis has been applied to societies in diverse geographical areas and across different time periods. In 1983, Douglas Charles and Jane E. Buikstra made a study of Mississippian funerary sites from the Archaic period (c. 8000 – c. 1000 BCE). They connected the hypotheses of Saxe and Goldstein to modes of subsistence (that is, the means by which a society acquires the resources necessary for survival). They argued that sedentary modes of subsistence correlated with the use of formal cemetery areas, and that the inclusion of individuals in cemeteries implied their inclusion in corporate groups competing for restricted resources. Umesh Chattopadhyaya concluded in 1996 that the Saxe–Goldstein hypothesis could be applied to Mesolithic (middle Stone Age) hunter-gatherer societies of the Ganges valley. It has also been used to explain the establishment of Neolithic (later Stone Age) cemeteries in northwest Europe. Patricia McAnany popularized the hypothesis among Mesoamerican archaeologists through her 1995 book Living with the Ancestors, in which she argued for the use of burial as creating a "principle of first occupancy", giving claims to land through descent from those who originally farmed it. (Note: Rosenswig, Briggs & Masson 2020, p. 4. McAnany's book is (in second edition) McAnany 2014.) Carla Antonaccio, also in 1995, used the hypothesis as a foundation of her study of the use of cemeteries between the Bronze Age and Early Iron Age in Greece. She argued that the evidence of feasting and libations at ancient tombs, as well as their re-entry and re-use, was evidence for the ancestor worship of mythical heroes.

Certain studies have employed the Saxe–Goldstein hypothesis alongside typically post-processual theoretical focuses, such as an emphasis on individual agency (that is, the ability of people to act as they wish) and how material culture can be used to challenge or assert the social order, rather than passively reflecting it. Ian Morris invoked the hypothesis in 1991 to explain the differences in burial practice between the classical cities of Athens and Rome, by which cemeteries were tightly controlled by the state in Athens but comparatively unregulated in Rome. He added a cognitive explanation, based on the use of textual evidence, to suggest that Athenian cemeteries were used to legitimize claims to citizenship, which was comparatively more restricted and more valuable in Athens than in Rome. (Note: Rosenswig, Briggs & Masson 2020, p. 4. Morris's study is Morris 1991.) Morris qualified the hypothesis by emphasizing that claims of descent from ancestors need not be associated with ancestor worship. Matthew C. Velasco's 2014 study of pre-Hispanic burials in Peru's Colca Valley used the Saxe–Goldstein hypothesis alongside explanations centering the agency of material objects (that is, the ability of objects to influence or constrain the actions of human beings) and the role of funerary rituals in constructing social identities. (Note: Velasco 2014, p. 455; Rosenswig, Briggs & Masson 2020, p. 4. On these areas as specifically post-processual focuses, see Chapman & Wylie 2015, p. 6. On the agency of material objects, see Hoskins 2006, p. 76.) Luca Cherstich employed the hypothesis in his 2024 study of the tombs of classical Cyrene, but wrote that it was necessary to temper it with a post-processual investigation of the intent and agency behind the formation of the funerary record.

== Reception ==
=== Criticism ===
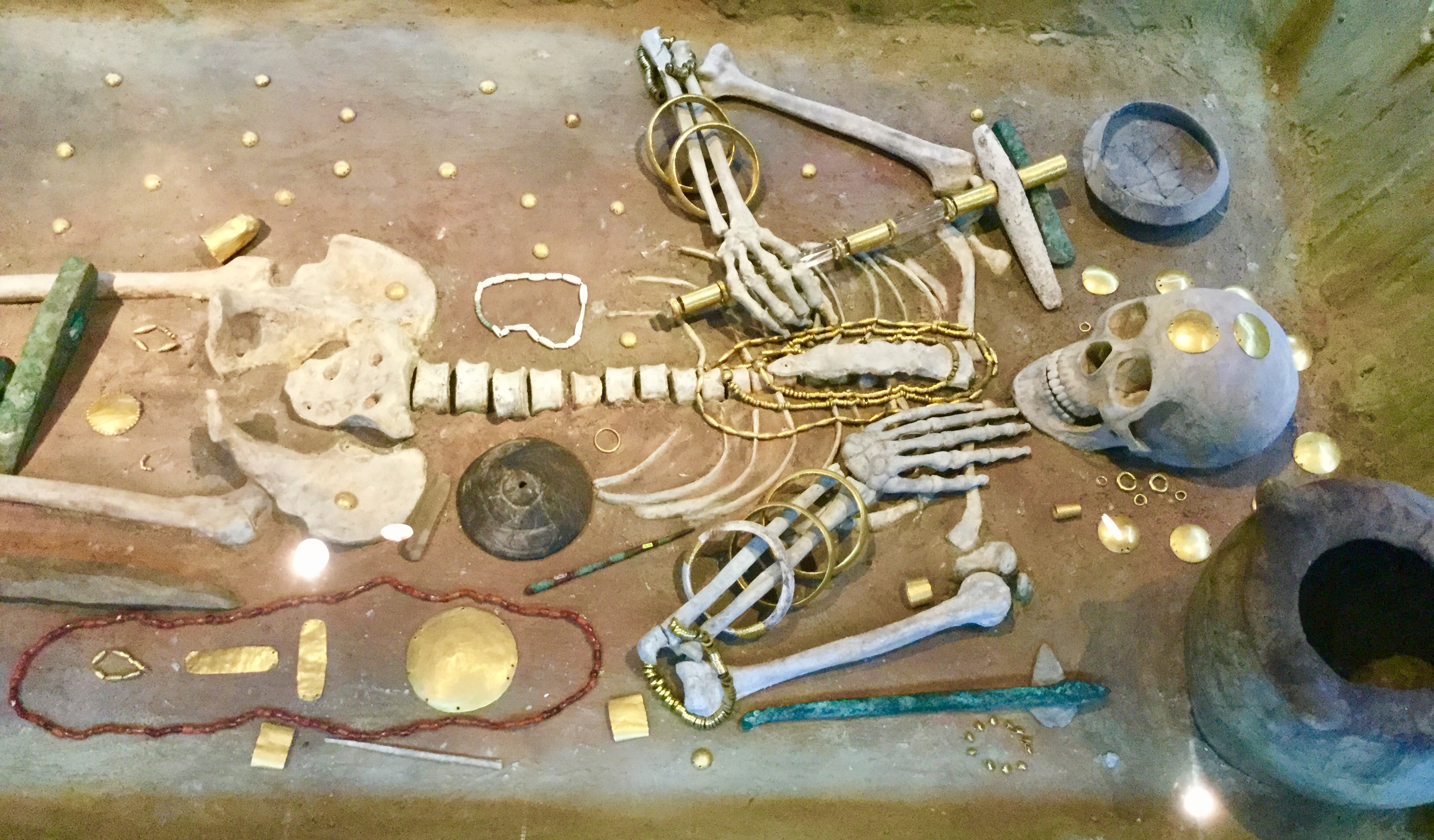
A burial from Varna in Bulgaria, with golden grave goods, dated to c. 4,600 – c. 4,200 BCE

The Saxe–Goldstein hypothesis was criticized by post-processual archaeologists of the 1980s, who argued that it did not leave sufficient room for the beliefs and intentions of those who lived in the past and created the archaeological record. Ian Hodder, in 1982, used the example of the Mesakin people of Sudan to argue that the burial record may only represent an idealized fraction of the social relations within a society, drawing attention to what he called "the disjunction between burial pattern and social pattern". In the same year, Hodder's students Michael Shanks and Christopher Tilley criticized the functionalist position adopted by Saxe and other processualists, by which social phenomena are analyzed primarily in terms of their observable outcomes. Shanks and Tilley wrote that such arguments were inadequate to explain the specific content and context of funerary ritual, and that mortuary practices may be used to invert and misrepresent the social order as much as they may reflect it. Mike Parker Pearson, another of Hodder's students, later wrote that "to reduce the significance of ancestors and tombs to a means of subsistence management is to relegate human aspiration and motivation to wondering where the next meal is coming from".

Attempts to use the treatment of the dead to infer social status or organization fell from scholarly favor in the 1980s, and were generally replaced by investigations of what funerary practices meant to those who carried them out. In 1984, Hodder again criticized the Saxe–Goldstein hypothesis as presenting a "relatively passive view of society", in which cultural context was ignored, and the meanings of funerary actions were lost. Other criticisms leveled by Morris, among others, included that burial itself represents only part of the funerary ritual, and that excessive reliance on it in archaeological explanation may neglect the role of other aspects that are less archaeologically visible. In a 1986 dissertation, R. A. Kerber argued that the framework proposed by Saxe and Binford only held where the transfer of power between generations was unquestioned, rather than being a site of negotiation, contention or competition. (Note: Kerber 1986, cited in Brown 2013, pp. 363–364)

Over the course of the 1980s, the hypothesis came to be generally rejected. James Whitley suggests that this was the result of a mistaken belief among archaeologists that it must be used as a rigid law rather than a general relationship. It was criticized, including from within the processual movement, on both ethnographic and archaeological grounds. John M. O'Shea argued that the living might mark social distinctions between the dead in ways which would not necessarily be preserved in the archaeological record. (Note: Chapman 2013, p. 52, citing O'Shea 1981.) In 1991, Whitley questioned the validity of the ethnographic evidence behind the hypothesis, writing that the burial practices of the Merina (used as evidence by Saxe) owed more to ideology and beliefs about the dead than to the social position of the deceased, and that it was "seriously misleading" to use them as straightforward confirmation of Saxe's hypothesis. In 2002, William Rathje, Vincent Lamotta, and William Longacre used the Saxe–Goldstein hypothesis as an example of what they called the "black hole" of archaeological explanation, namely that archaeologists were unwilling to incorporate observations from their own societies into supposedly general models of human behavior. In support of this, they argued that it fitted poorly with burial practices in the contemporary United States.

Whitley considered the Saxe–Goldstein hypothesis a generalization, rather than a universal truth, and that it could not be considered proven. He further suggested that it placed too little emphasis on the agency of people involved in the burial process, and on their potentially competing interests. He also criticized the hypothesis (as used by Morris) for relying excessively on ancestors as an explanation, arguing that ethnographic parallels did not give ancestors the same central social role as Saxe, Goldstein, and their followers assumed they must hold. In 2012, André Strauss wrote that the hypothesis had little value in interpreting Brazilian sites of the Archaic period, particularly because of the difficulty of precisely defining a "formal disposal area" within the terms of the prediction.

=== Legacy ===
Some post-processual archaeologists returned to using funerary evidence to infer social hierarchies in the 1990s. However, during this period, funerary archaeology played a comparatively small role in archaeology, particularly in the United States, due both to cultural changes among archaeologists and to methodological difficulties with its study. The Saxe–Goldstein hypothesis remained fairly rarely used, particularly among British archaeologists. Parker Pearson wrote in 1999 that the hypothesis could partially explain why cemeteries may be constructed, but did not explain why a society would choose to adopt cemeteries rather than other means of highlighting individuals' descent from certain ancestors. He also argued that the hypothesis did not encompass the full significance of relationships between the living and the ancestors. In 2010, Emma Elder wrote that it was "in the graveyard of disused theoretical tools", though she considered that it could still be useful if applied with proper qualification. In 2013, David Edwards wrote that the Saxe–Goldstein hypothesis could be applied to certain African burial rites, such as the below-house burial practiced in West Africa, though these rituals also contained other meanings and alternative methods could be used alongside them to assert territorial claims.

Hypothesis Eight was described by Chapman in 2013 as the most famous of Saxe's eight hypotheses, and by Parker Pearson as the only one that had continued to be used and discussed by 1999. While generally rejecting it as excessively reductionist and deterministic, Parker Pearson credited the hypothesis with focusing archaeologists' attention on the use of ancestors to create legitimacy for structures of social hierarchy. In 2017, the archaeologist Joanne Curtin described the work of Saxe and Binford as the most significant recent development in funerary archaeology.

In 2002, Whitley wrote that the Saxe–Goldstein hypothesis had become part of the "theoretical unconscious" of Neolithic archaeologists, including those who subscribed to post-processual theories that generally rejected its processual basis. Brown wrote in 2007 that it was the "most enduring accomplishment" of the processual approach to mortuary studies, and that it had remained useful into the present. While he judged that the hypothesis had been of "limited success in producing durable findings", he credited it with renewing interest in funerary practices among archaeologists, other scholars, and the public. Robert Rosenswig, Margaret Briggs, and Marilyn Masson similarly considered it part of "the realm of archaeological common sense" in 2020.

== See also ==
- Veneration of the dead

== Bibliography ==
- Antonaccio, Carla M. (1995). An Archaeology of Ancestors: Greek Tomb and Hero Cult. Lanham: Rowman & Littlefield. ISBN 978-0-8476-7942-3.
- Barrett, John C.; Boyd, Michael J. (2020). From Stonehenge to Mycenae: The Challenges of Archaeological Interpretation. London: Bloomsbury Academic. ISBN 978-1-350-19082-5.
- Binford, Lewis (1962). "Archaeology as Anthropology". American Antiquity. 28 (2): 217–225. doi:10.2307/278380. ISSN 0002-7316. JSTOR 278380.
- Binford, Lewis (1971). "Mortuary Practices: Their Study and Their Potential". Memoirs of the Society for American Archaeology. 25 (25): 6–29. doi:10.1017/S0081130000002525. ISSN 0081-1300. JSTOR 25146709.
- Bloch, Maurice (1982). "Death, Women and Power". In Bloch, Maurice; Parry, Jonathan (eds.). Death and the Regeneration of Life (PDF). Cambridge University Press. pp. 211–230. doi:10.1017/CBO9780511607646. ISBN 0-511-60764-4.
- Brown, James A. (1981). "The Search for Rank in Prehistoric Burials". In Chapman, Robert; Kinnes, Ian; Randsborg, Klavs (eds.). The Archaeology of Death. New Directions in Archaeology. Cambridge University Press. pp. 25–37. ISBN 0-521-23775-0 – via Academia.edu.
- Brown, James A. (1995). "On Mortuary Analysis—with Special Reference to the Saxe-Binford Research Program". Regional Approaches to Mortuary Analysis. Interdisciplinary Contributions to Archaeology. pp. 3–26. doi:10.1007/978-1-4899-1310-4_1. ISBN 978-1-4899-1312-8.
- Brown, James A. (2007). "Mortuary Practices for the Third Millennium: 1966–2006". Performing Death: Social Analyses of Funerary Traditions in the Ancient Near East and Mediterranean. Interdisciplinary Contributions to Archaeology. pp. 3–26. ISBN 978-1-4899-1312-8.
- Brown, James A. (2013). "Archaeological Study of Mortuary Practices in the Eastern United States". In Nilsson Stutz, Liv; Tarlow, Sarah (eds.). The Oxford Handbook of the Archaeology of Death and Burial. Oxford University Press. pp. 359–373. doi:10.1093/oxfordhb/9780199569069.013.0019. ISBN 978-0-19-956906-9.
- Carr, Christopher (1995). "Mortuary Practices: Their Social, Philosophical-Religious, Circumstantial, and Physical Determinants". Journal of Archaeological Method and Theory. 2 (2): 105–200. doi:10.1007/BF02228990. ISSN 1072-5369. JSTOR 20177326.
- Chapman, Robert (1981). "The Emergence of Formal Disposal Areas and the 'Problem' of Megalithic Tombs in Prehistoric Europe". In Laneri, Nicola (ed.). The Archaeology of Death. Oriental Institute Seminars. Vol. 3. University of Chicago. pp. 71–82. ISBN 978-1-885923-50-9.
- Chapman, Robert (2013). "Death, Burial and Social Representation". In Nilsson Stutz, Liv; Tarlow, Sarah (eds.). The Oxford Handbook of the Archaeology of Death and Burial. Oxford University Press. pp. 47–57. doi:10.1093/oxfordhb/9780199569069.013.0004. ISBN 978-0-19-956906-9.
- Chapman, Robert; Wylie, Alison (2015). Material Evidence: Learning from Archaeological Practice. Abingdon: Routledge. ISBN 978-1-317-57623-5.
- Charles, Douglas K.; Buikstra, Jane E. (1983). "Archaic Mortuary Sites in the Central Mississippi Drainage: Distribution, Structure, and Behavioral Implications". In Phillips, James L.; Brown, James A. (eds.). Archaic Hunters and Gatherers in the American Midwest. New York: Academic Press. pp. 117–145. ISBN 1-59874-452-6.
- Chattopadhyaya, Umesh C. (1996). "Settlement Pattern and the Spatial Organization of Subsistence and Mortuary Practices in the Mesolithic Ganges Valley, North-central India". World Archaeology. 27 (3): 461–476. doi:10.1080/00438243.1996.9980320. ISSN 0043-8243. JSTOR 124936.
- Cherstich, Luca (2024). The Southern Necropolis of Cyrene. Oxford: Archaeopress. ISBN 978-1-80327-549-9.
- Curtin, Joanne (2017). Prehistoric Mortuary Variability on Gabriola Island, British Columbia. Burnaby: Simon Fraser University Archaeology Press. ISBN 978-0-86491-227-5.
- Das, Debojyoti (2018). The Politics of Swidden Farming: Environment and Development in Eastern India. London: Anthem Press. ISBN 978-1-78308-776-1.
- Earle, Timothy K.; Preucel, Robert W. (1987). "Processual Archaeology and the Radical Critique". Current Anthropology. 28 (4): 501–538. doi:10.1086/203551. ISSN 0011-3204. JSTOR 2743487.
- Edwards, David N. (2013). "African Perspectives on Death, Burial, and Mortuary Archaeology". In Nilsson Stutz, Liv; Tarlow, Sarah (eds.). The Oxford Handbook of the Archaeology of Death and Burial. Oxford University Press. pp. 209–226. doi:10.1093/oxfordhb/9780199569069.013.0012. ISBN 978-0-19-956906-9.
- Elder, Emma (2010). A Comparison of the Late Pleistocene and Early Holocene Burials of North Africa and Western Europe: Grim Investigations: Reaping the Dead. British Archaeological Reports International Series. Vol. 2143. Oxford: British Archaeological Reports. doi:10.30861/9781407306841. ISBN 978-1-4073-0684-1.
- Fowler, Chris (2010). "From Identity and Material Culture to Personhood and Materiality". In Hicks, Dan; Beaudry, Mary C. (eds.). The Oxford Handbook of Material Culture Studies. Oxford University Press. pp. 352–387. ISBN 978-0-19-921871-4.
- Glazier, Jack (1984). "Mbeere Ancestors and the Domestication of Death". Man. 19 (1): 133–147. doi:10.2307/2803228. ISSN 0025-1496. JSTOR 2803228.
- Goldstein, Lynne (1976). Spatial Structure and Social Organization: Regional Manifestations of Mississippian Society (PhD thesis). Northwestern University. OCLC 3175396.
- Goldstein, Lynne (1981). "One-Dimensional Archaeology and Multi-Dimensional People: Spatial Organization and Mortuary Analysis". In Chapman, Robert; Kinnes, Ian; Randsborg, Klavs (eds.). The Archaeology of Death. New Directions in Archaeology. Cambridge University Press. pp. 53–69. ISBN 0-521-23775-0.
- Gosden, Chris (2002) [1999]. Anthropology and Archaeology: A Changing Relationship. Abingdon: Routledge. ISBN 978-1-134-71620-3.
- Gruschke, Andreas (2004). The Cultural Monuments of Tibet's Outer Provinces: The TAR Part of Kham, Tibetan Autonomous Region. Bankok: White Lotus Press. ISBN 974-480-049-6.
- Hill, Erica; Hageman, Jon B. (2016). "The Archaeology of Ancestors". In Hill, Erica; Hageman, Jon B. (eds.). The Archaeology of Ancestors: Death, Memory, and Veneration. Gainesville: University Press of Florida. pp. 42–80. ISBN 978-0-8130-6251-8.
- Hodder, Ian (1982). Symbols in Action: Ethnoarchaeological Studies of Material Culture. Cambridge University Press. ISBN 0-521-24176-6.
- Hodder, Ian (1984). "Burials, Houses, Women and Men in the European Neolithic". In Miller, Daniel; Tilley, Christopher (eds.). Ideology, Power and Prehistory. Cambridge University Press. pp. 51–68. ISBN 0-521-25526-0.
- Hodder, Ian; Shanks, Michael; Alexandri, Alexandra; Buchli, Victor; Carman, John; Last, Jonathan; Lucas, Gavin, eds. (2013) [1995]. Interpreting Archaeology: Finding Meaning in the Past. London and New York: Routledge. ISBN 978-1-317-79946-7.
- Hoskins, Janet (2006). "Agency, Biography and Objects". In Tilley, Christopher; Keane, Webb; Kuechler, Suzanne; Rowlands, Michael; Spyer, Patricia (eds.). Handbook of Material Culture. London: Sage. pp. 74–84. ISBN 978-1-84860-797-2 – via ResearchGate.net.
- Kerber, R. A. (1986). Political Evolution in the Lower Illinois Valley, Evanston, Ill (PhD thesis). Northwestern University. OCLC 1194781816.
- Kus, Susan (2013). "Death and the Cultural Entanglements of the Experienced, the Learned, the Expressed, the Contested, and the Imagined". In Nilsson Stutz, Liv; Tarlow, Sarah (eds.). The Oxford Handbook of the Archaeology of Death and Burial. Oxford University Press. pp. 58–75. doi:10.1093/oxfordhb/9780199569069.013.0005. ISBN 978-0-19-956906-9.
- McAnany, Patricia (2014) [1995]. Living with the Ancestors (2nd ed.). Cambridge University Press. doi:10.1017/CBO9781139017190. ISBN 978-1-139-01719-0.
- Meggitt, Mervyn J. (1965). "The Mae Enga of the Western Highlands". In Lawrence, Peter; Meggitt, Mervyn J. (eds.). Gods, Ghosts and Men in Melanesia: Some Religions of Australian New Guinea and the New Hebrides. Melbourne: Oxford University Press. pp. 105–131. ISBN 978-0-19-550147-6. OCLC 347026 – via Internet Archive.
- Morris, Ian (1991). "The Archaeology of Ancestors: The Saxe/Goldstein Hypothesis Revisited". Cambridge Archaeological Journal. 1 (2): 147–169. doi:10.1017/S0959774300000330. ISSN 1474-0540.
- O'Shea, John M. (1981). "Social Configurations and the Archaeological Study of Mortuary Practices". In Chapman, Robert; Kinnes, Ian; Randsborg, Klavs (eds.). The Archaeology of Death. New Directions in Archaeology. Cambridge University Press. pp. 39–52. ISBN 0-521-23775-0.
- Pardoe, Colin (1988). "The Cemetery as Symbol: The Distribution of Prehistoric Aboriginal Burial Grounds in Southeastern Australia". Archaeology in Oceania. 23 (1): 1–16. doi:10.1002/j.1834-4453.1988.tb00178.x. ISSN 1834-4453.
- Parker Pearson, Mike (2009) [1999]. The Archaeology of Death and Burial. Stroud: The History Press. ISBN 978-0-7509-3276-9.
- Raab, L. Mark; Goodyear, Albert C. (1984). "Middle-Range Theory in Archaeology: A Critical Review of Origins and Applications". American Antiquity. 49 (2): 255–268. doi:10.2307/280018. ISSN 0002-7316. JSTOR 280018.
- Rathje, William; Lamotta, Vincent; Longacre, William (2002). "Into the Black Hole: Archaeology 2001 and Beyond ...". In Cunliffe, Barry; Davies, Wendy; Renfrew, Colin (eds.). Archaeology: The Widening Debate. Oxford University Press. pp. 497–540. ISBN 0-19-726255-4.
- Rosenswig, Robert M.; Briggs, Margaret L.; Masson, Marilyn A. (2020). "Burying the Dead During the Maya Postclassic period: Saxe, Binford and Goldstein's Continued Relevance to Mortuary Analysis". Journal of Anthropological Archaeology. 58 101147. doi:10.1016/j.jaa.2020.101147. ISSN 1090-2686.
- Rowley-Conwy, Peter; Piper, Stephanie (2016). "Hunter-Gatherer Variability: Developing Models for the Northern Coasts". Arctic. 69: 1–14. ISSN 0004-0843. JSTOR 26891241.
- Saxe, Arthur Alan (1970). Social Dimensions of Mortuary Practices (PhD thesis). University of Michigan. doi:10.7302/10451.
- Saxe, Arthur Alan; Gall, P. L. (1977). "Ecological Determinants of Mortuary Practices: The Temuan of Malaysia". In Wood, William (ed.). Cultural-Ecological Perspectives on Southeast Asia: A Symposium. Papers in International Studies: Southeast Asia Series. Vol. 41. Athens: Ohio University. pp. 74–82. ISBN 0-8214-0322-2.
- Shanks, Michael; Tilley, Christopher (1982). "Ideology, Symbolic Power, and Ritual Communication: A Reinterpretation of Neolithic Mortuary Practices". In Hodder, Ian (ed.). Symbolic and Structural Archaeology. New Directions in Archaeology. Cambridge University Press. pp. 129–154. doi:10.1017/CBO9780511558252. ISBN 0-51-155825-2.
- Shennan, Stephen (2007). "The Spread of Farming into Central Europe and Its Consequences: Evolutionary Models". In Kohler, Timothy A.; Van der Leeuw, Sander E. (eds.). The Model-Based Archaeology of Socionatural Systems. Santa Fe: School for Advanced Research. pp. 141–156. ISBN 978-1-930618-87-9 – via Internet Archive.
- Strauss, André (2012). "Interpretative Possibilities and Limitations of Saxe/Goldstein Hypothesis". Boletim do Museu Paraense Emílio Goeldi Ciências Humanas (in Portuguese). 7 (2): 525–546. doi:10.1590/S1981-81222012000200013. hdl:11858/00-001M-0000-0010-1F78-D. ISSN 1981-8122.
- Suriano, Matthew J. (2018). A History of Death in the Hebrew Bible. Vol. 1. Oxford University Press. doi:10.1093/oso/9780190844738.001.0001. ISBN 978-0-19-084473-8.
- Tainter, Joseph (1976). "Spatial Organisation and Social Patterning in the Kaloko Cemetery, North Kona, Hawaii". Archaeology and Physical Anthropology in Oceania. 11 (2): 91–105. ISSN 0003-8121. JSTOR 40386261.
- Tainter, Joseph (1978). "Mortuary Practices and the Study of Prehistoric Social Systems". Advances in Archaeological Method and Theory. 1: 105–141. ISSN 0162-8003. JSTOR 20170131.
- Tarlow, Sarah (1999). Bereavement and Commemoration: An Archaeology of Mortality. Oxford: Blackwell. ISBN 0-631-20613-2 – via Internet Archive.
- Taylor, Richard P. (2000). Death and the Afterlife: A Cultural Encyclopedia. London: Bloomsbury Academic. ISBN 0-87436-939-8.
- Velasco, Matthew C. (2014). "Building on the Ancestors: Mortuary Structures and Extended Agency in the Late Prehispanic Colca Valley, Peru". Cambridge Archaeological Journal. 24 (3): 453–465. doi:10.1017/S0959774314000778. ISSN 0959-7743.
- Whitley, James (1995). "Tomb Cult and Hero Cult: The Uses of the Past in Archaic Greece". In Spencer, Nigel (ed.). Time, Tradition and Society in Greek Archaeology: Bridging the "Great Divide". Abingdon: Routledge. pp. 43–63. doi:10.4324/9780203759349. ISBN 978-0-203-75934-9.
- Whitley, James (2002). "Too Many Ancestors?". Antiquity. 76 (291): 119–126. doi:10.1017/S0003598X00089870. ISSN 0003-598X.
- Whitley, James (2003) [1991]. Style and Society in Dark Age Greece: The Changing Face of a Pre-literate Society 1100–700 BC. Cambridge University Press. ISBN 0-521-54585-4.
- Zubrow, Ezra B. W. (2024). "Processual Archaeology". In Biehl, Peter F.; Endere, Maria-Luz (eds.). Encyclopaedia of Archaeology. Vol. 1 (2nd ed.). Cambridge, Massachusetts: Academic Press. pp. 61–71. doi:10.1016/B978-0-323-90799-6.00182-8. ISBN 978-0-323-91856-5.
