= The Archaeology of Death and Burial =

Book by Michael Parker Pearson

- The first edition cover of the book, depicting a skull found at the Neolithic archaeological site of Jericho.
- Author: Mike Parker Pearson
- Language: English
- Subject: Archaeology; Funeral
- Publisher: Sutton Publishing Ltd
- Publication date: 1999
- Publication place: United Kingdom
- Media type: Print (hardback & paperback)
- Pages: 250
- ISBN: 978-0750917773

The Archaeology of Death and Burial is an archaeological study by the English archaeologist Mike Parker Pearson, then a professor at the University of Sheffield. It was first published in 1999 by Sutton Publishing Limited, and later republished by The History Press.

Parker Pearson's book adopts a post-processual approach to funerary archaeology. It explores earlier approaches to the subject that have been advocated by social anthropologists and processual archaeologists.

The Archaeology of Death and Burial was reviewed in various academic, peer-reviewed journals, to widespread praise, with a number of reviewers noting that the book would work well as a textbook on the subject of funerary archaeology for students. Some however criticised what they saw as Parker Pearson's dismissive and negative attitude towards processual approaches to funerary archaeology.

== Background ==
Mike Parker Pearson attained his BA in archaeology at the University of Southampton in 1979, where he had been supervised by the prominent post-processual archaeologist Ian Hodder, and socialised with several of Hodder's other students, including Sheena Crawford, Daniel Miller, Henrietta Moore, Christopher Tilley and Alice Welbourn. Like them, he had come under the influence of Hodder's post-processual ideas, in particular his use of structuralism as an interpretative tool. Parker Pearson went on to write a number of academic papers that were published in early post-processual anthologies such as Symbolic and Structural Archaeology (1982), Marxist Perspectives in Archaeology (1984) and Ideology, Power and Prehistory (1984). In 1985, he was awarded his PhD in archaeology from the University of Cambridge for a thesis entitled "Death, society and societal change: the Iron Age of southern Jutland 200 BC – 600 AD."

Gaining work as an Inspector of Ancient Monuments for English Heritage, in 1989 he became a member of the Institute of Field Archaeologists. In 1990, he took up an academic teaching position at the University of Sheffield, becoming a fellow of the Society of Antiquaries the following year.

== Synopsis ==
Chapter one, "Learning from the Dead", opens with an account of a 10th-century Volga Viking funeral from the Arab traveller Ibn Fadlan. Parker Pearson then highlights that funerals and the rites of the dead tell us more about the living in a society rather than the dead themselves. The book then proceeds to offer an overview of such issues as inhumation, cremation, grave goods, the organisation of cemeteries and human sacrifice.

In the second chapter, "From Now to Then: Ethnoarchaeology and Analogy", Parker Pearson explores earlier anthropological and archaeological theoretical approaches to death and burial. Beginning with a discussion of social anthropological approaches, he discusses the role of death as a rite of passage, thereby introducing the reader to the work of the anthropologist Arnold van Gennep. From there, he moves on to a discussion of functionalist approaches to death among social anthropologists, highlighting that funerals often serve as political events among communities. This is followed by a discussion of the dead as polluting entities, an idea advocated by Mary Douglas, and then themes of fertility and regeneration. He finally refers to the rites of reversal and ancestor veneration that play a role in funerals in many societies. From social anthropology, he moves on to look at the processual archaeological approaches to funerary archaeology, which have been advocated since the 1960s. In doing so, he discusses Arthur Saxe's arguments regarding the social dimensions of mortuary practices as well as Joseph Tainter's theories regarding the relationship between the energy expenditure used for a funeral and the social status of the corpse. He rounds this section off by highlighting a number of criticisms of processual approaches. Proceeding with a discussion of post-processual archaeological approaches, Parker Pearson looks at the influence of social practice and human agency on mortuary practices.

== Reception ==
=== Academic reviews ===
Jane Buikstra of the University of New Mexico reviewed Parker Pearson's tome for the Journal of Anthropological Research. Considering it to be a "curious and intriguing" work, she thought it noteworthy that there was no introductory chapter exploring the author's goals. Remarking that Parker Pearson was clearly well versed in the subject, she also praised the use of illustrations throughout the book. Ultimately, she felt that The Archaeology of Death and Burial read like a series of essays, with the epilogue and the appendix being poorly integrated with the rest of the text, but nevertheless considered it to be "very good" overall.

"Apart from the boldness of its vision, the clarity of its argument, and the breadth of its learning – the bibliography is 26 pages in small type – this book's most impressive feature is the rich diversity of its exempla. The author vividly illustrates the customs of many different historic and geographic realms, from the frozen barrows at Pazyryk in central Asia to Sutton Hoo, the Berewan of Borneo, African Americans in colonial Manhattan, and Chilean and Peruvian druglords. His selection is biased toward prehistoric northern Europe, but only because Britain and Scandinavia have long been in the vanguard of this growing field."

— Joseph L. Rife, 2001.

The American Journal of Archaeology published a book review by the classical archaeologist Joseph L. Rife of Cornell University in New York. In it, Rife described Parker Pearson's work as a "cogent, learned and entertaining" study that he believed would become both the primary textbook in the field of funerary archaeology and the prime example of a post-processual approach to the subject, arguing that the influence of Ian Hodder was "profound". Feeling that the work struck the correct balance between theoretical discussions and case studies, Rife notes that Parker Pearson had not used any examples from the classical Mediterranean, but nevertheless feels that classical archaeologists could learn much from reading the book.

Edward M. Luby of the Berkeley Natural History Museums reviewed the book for American Antiquity, asserting that it was written in a "clear and lively" manner and praising the detailed nature of the endnotes and bibliography, ultimately feeling that it would be of great use to undergraduate students, who would be particularly interested in its discussion of topics like mummification, bog bodies and cannibalism. Recognising its post-processual approach to the subject of funerary archaeology, he felt however that its critique of processual approaches had been unnecessarily severe, describing it as "one-sided, disappointing, and ultimately distracting." Luby felt that the book would have been greatly enhanced had Parker Pearson sought to unite processual and post-processual approaches rather than pitting the latter against the former in an "either/or" situation.

=== Wider reception ===
While referencing Parker Pearson's work in their 2005 book, The Quest for the Shaman, archaeologists Miranda and Stephen Aldhouse-Green commented that he had produced "a major contribution" to the study of "ancient death rituals".
