= Agongointo-Zoungoudo Underground Town =

Archaeological site in Benin

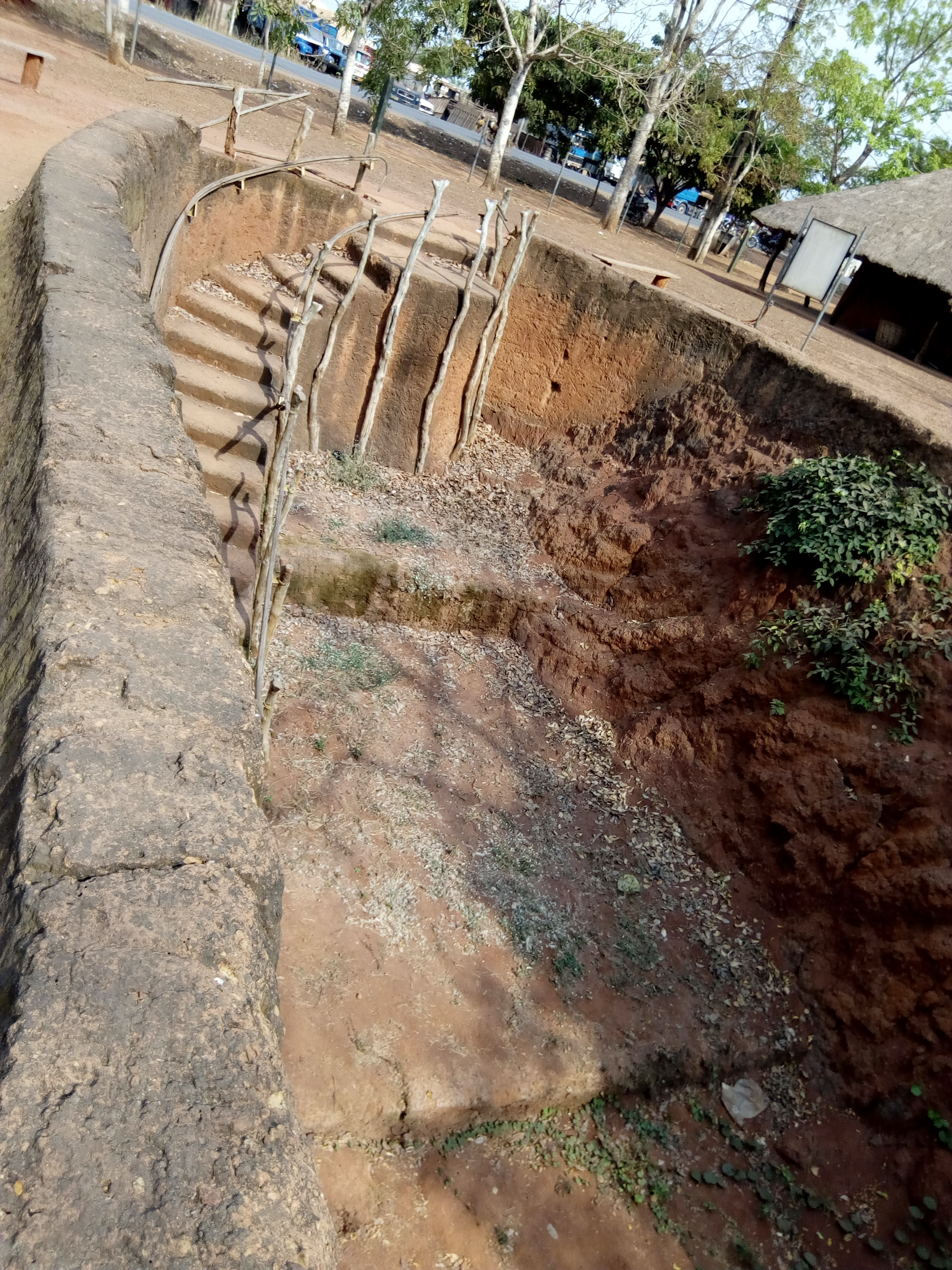
- Agongointo-Zoungoudo Underground Town
- Interactive map of Agongointo-Zoungoudo Underground Town
- 7.1889°N 2.0842°E
- Type: Underground Town
- Location: Abomey, Benin

History
- Built: 17th century

Site notes
- Archaeologists: DANIDA
- Discovered: 1998

Designations
- Designation: UNESCO World Heritage Tentative List

The underground town of Agongointo-Zoungoudo is located approximately 9 km (5.6 mi) from Abomey, in central Benin. The city was discovered in 1998 by the Danish company DANIDA. It consists of a series of bunkers and other housing structures around 10m deep underground, built in an apparent effort to provide dwelling as well as protection for warriors.

== History ==
These houses appear to have been built in the 17th century under the reign of King Dakodonou, the second King of Abomey. Souterrains around the Abomey plateau have been dated to the late 17th century. Archaeologists Randsborg and Merkyte initially argued that these souterrains played the sole function of providing military installations for the Dahomeyan army. To back their theory, they recounted Fon oral history about the invasion of Dahomey by the Oyo empire which states that "the Dahomean army ‘disappeared’ in the face of the enemy, later to re-appear behind him." Since 2009, the two scholars have revised their theory adding that the souterrains in the Abomey plateau played different functions ranging from mining, water storage and providing military installations. Historian Monroe Cameron agrees with the revised theory.

== World Heritage Status ==
This site was added to the UNESCO World Heritage Tentative List on June 19, 1998, in the Cultural category. It was added to the list because it reunited two criteria:

1. Represent a masterpiece of human creative genius.
2. Be an outstanding example of a type of building, architectural or technological ensemble or landscape which illustrates (a) significant stage(s) in human history.

== Gallery ==
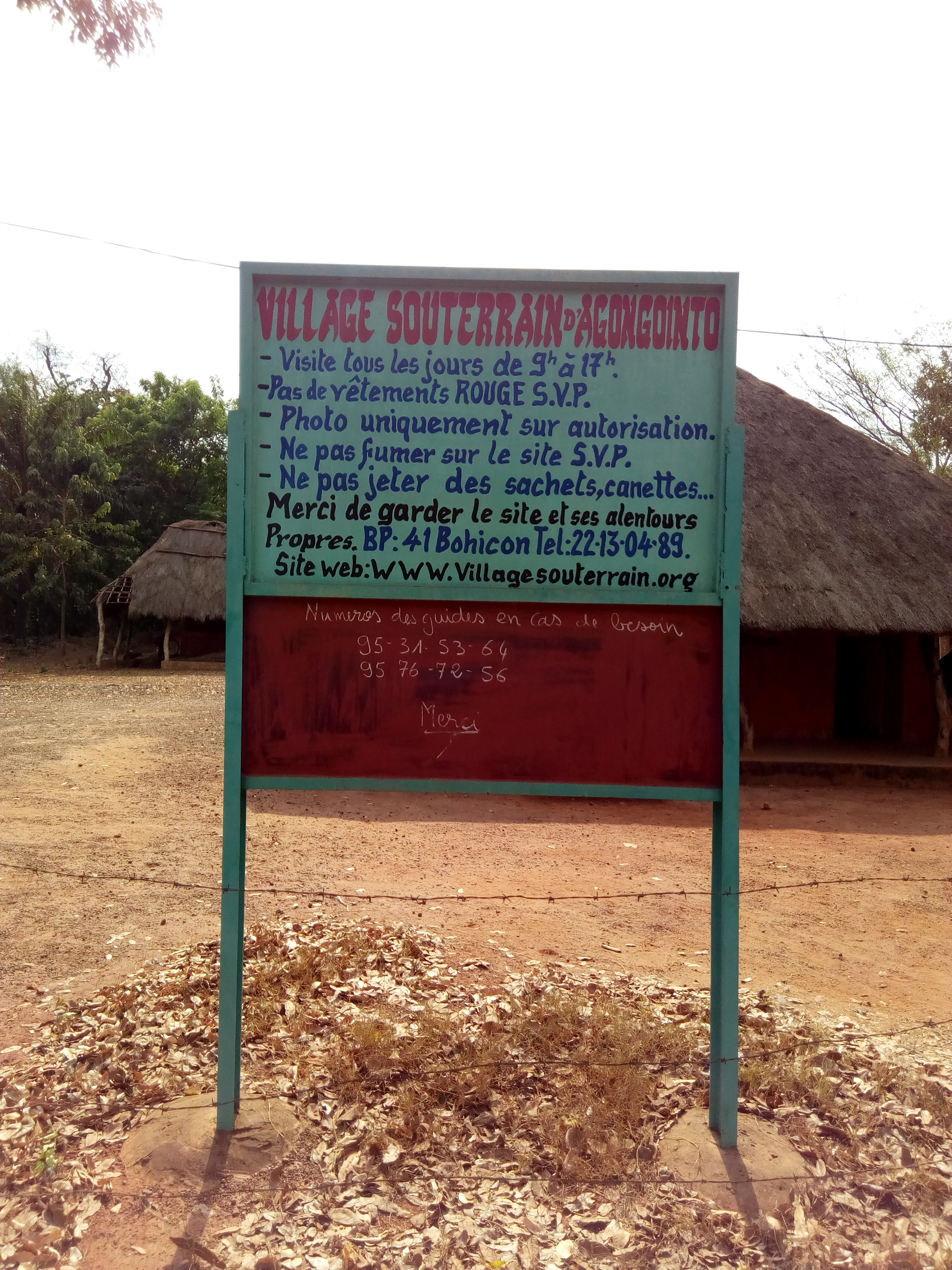
Sign at the entry stating the rules on the site.

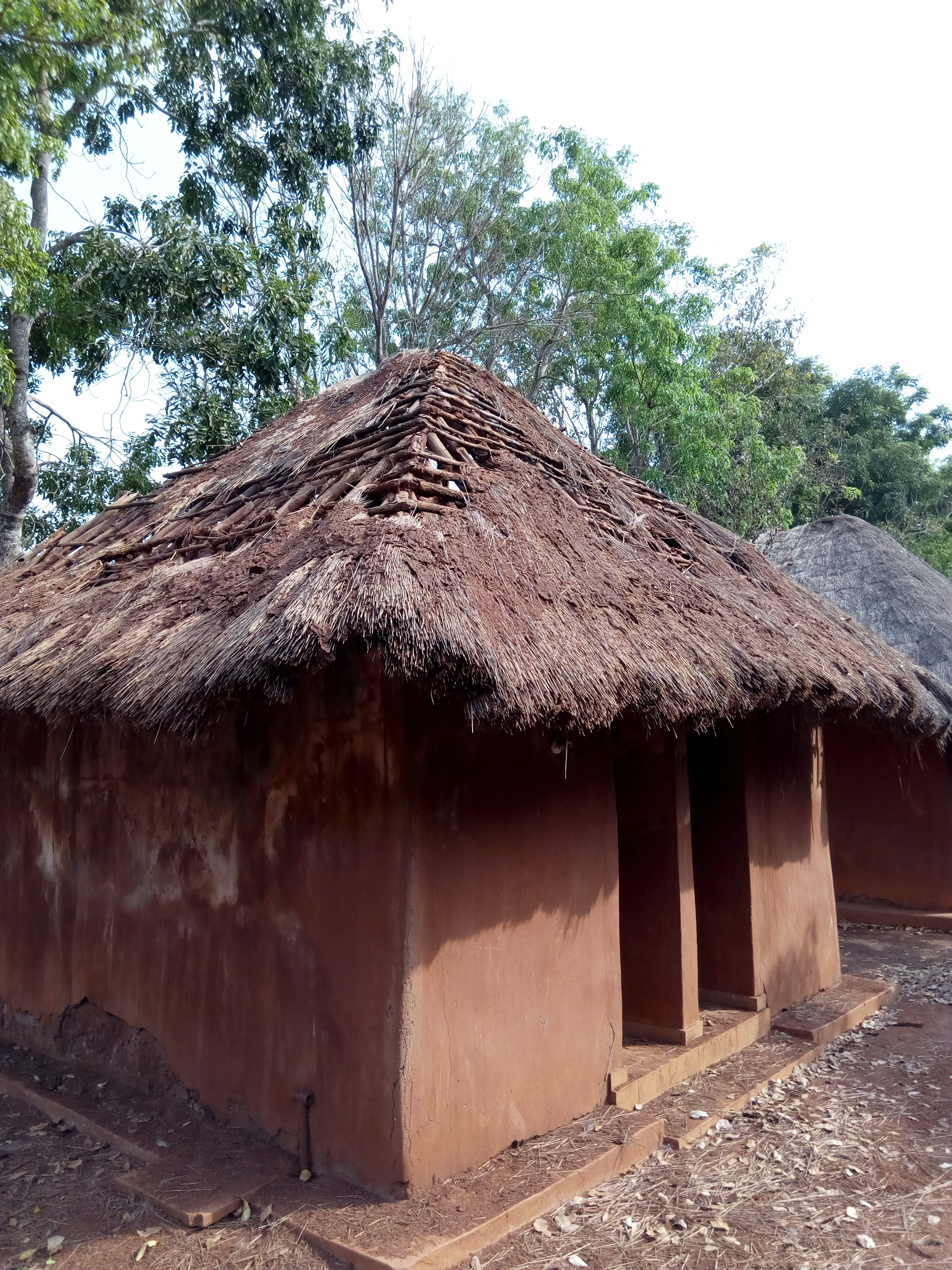
Hut in the village

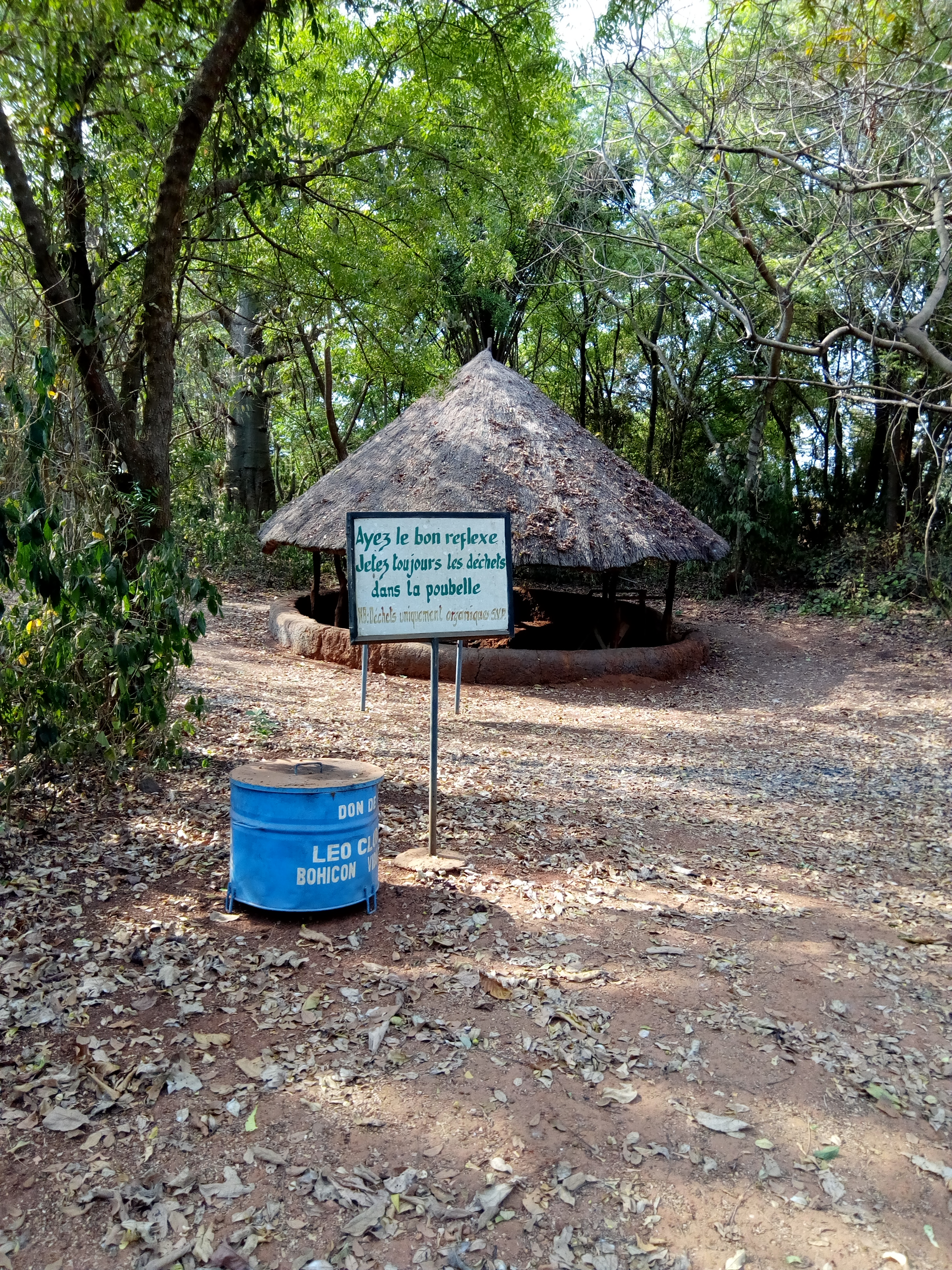
Access to one of the underground tunnel.

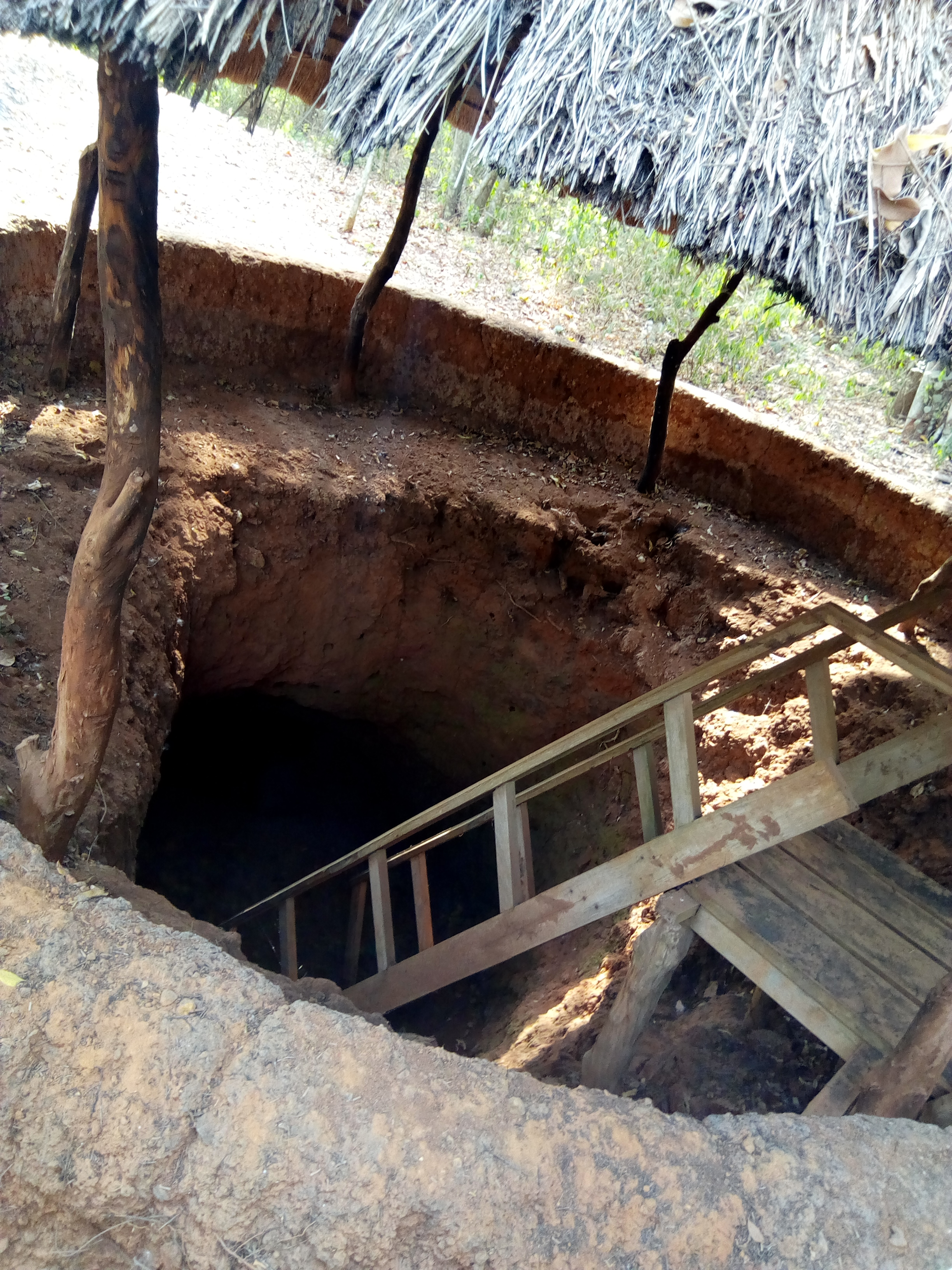
Access to one of the underground tunnel.

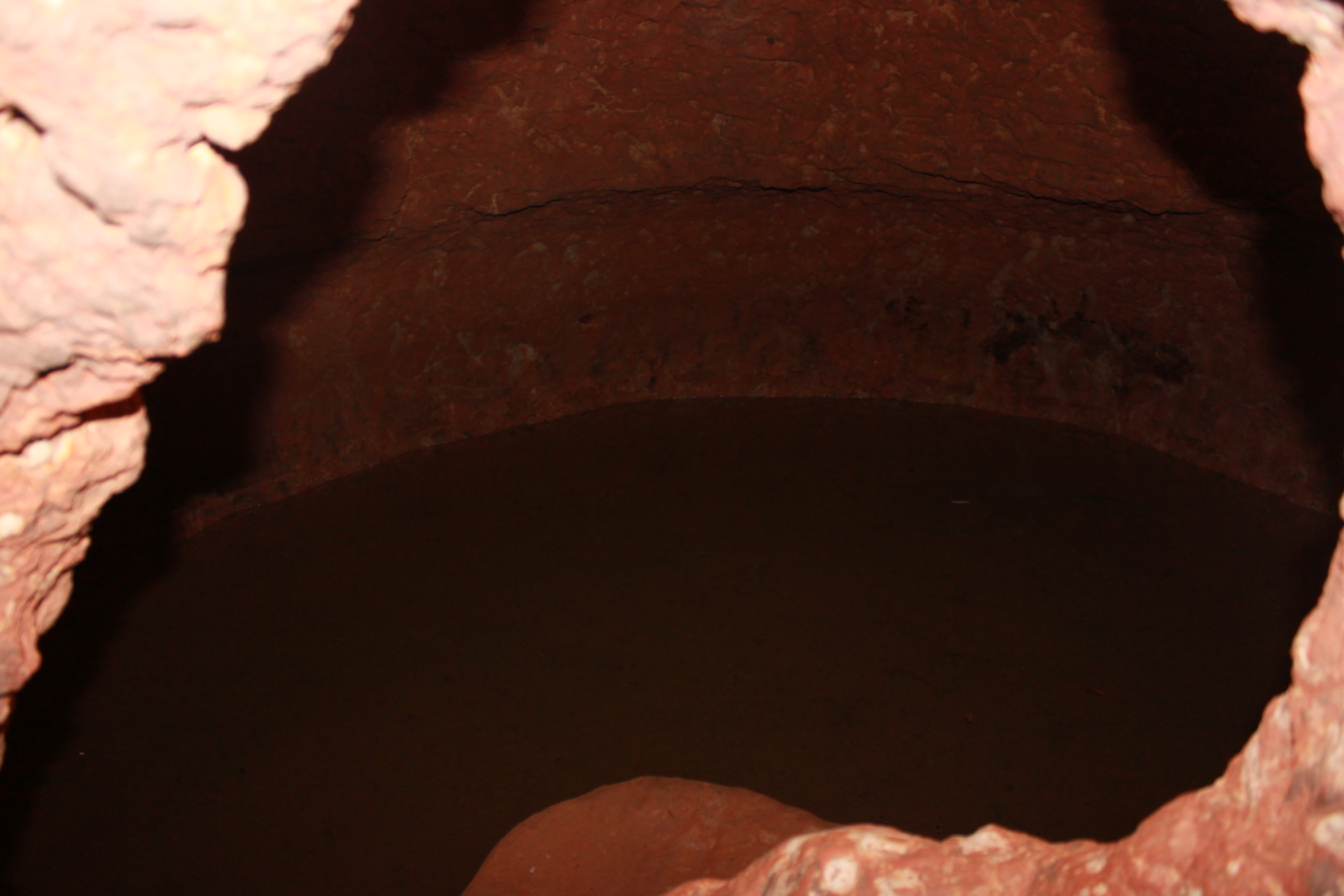
Entry to one of the underground house.
