= Sally Binford =

American archaeologist and feminist (1924–1994)

Sally Binford (née Rosen; 1924–1994) was an archaeologist and feminist. A prehistorian, she contributed alongside her husband (Lewis Binford) to the formation of processual archaeology.

== Early life ==
She was born in Brooklyn, New York, to Jewish parents. A collection of interviews with Binford were published by Janet Clinger in a collection of interviews called "Our Elders, Six Bay Area Life Stories." In the interviews, Binford is reported as saying that her parents were racists, and one of her first realizations of this was when she had a crush on a Chinese boy at school in the second grade.

With her parents' urging, Binford started at Vassar College in 1942. In 1943, Binford quit against her parents' wishes. After working for two years, she decided to attend the University of Chicago undergraduate program. She was briefly married and had one child, Susan, before divorcing in 1950.

== Early career in archaeology ==
In 1962 she completed her PhD at the University of Chicago in the department of anthropology, publishing on a survey of early prehistory in the Sahara. The faculty was all male and Binford felt that she was not taken seriously and experienced gender discrimination as a female student and single mother.

Sally taught at UCLA alongside Lewis, where students included Michael Schiffer. She excavated at Mousterian sites in Israel with F. Clark Howell at Combe Grenal, France with Lewis in 1966 and 1968. She studied lithics from Israel with François Bordes.

Binford co-founded the processual archaeology movement, which aimed to make archaeology more scientific with explicit evidence and quantitative techniques. It also employed new technologies in a set of approaches towards archeological study. For example, Don S. Rice argues that this approach wanted to explain why historical events happened, rather than simply prove that they happened. Binford and her then-husband, Lewis Binford, co-founded the movement, however Binford was often denied credit for her involvement. Sally and Lewis co-edited New Perspectives in Archaeology (1968), deriving from a symposium held in 1965 in Denver at the annual American Anthropological Association Conference. Its success has been attributed to Sally's editing skills. A 1966 article on Mousterian Levallois lithics was an early application of multivariate statistics in archaeology.

Her challenge of François Bordes in the 1960s over his taxonomic description of ancient French stone tool assemblages from the Mousterian period lead to the Bordes-Binford Debate, which revealed the discrepancies in training and theory that are practiced by European and American archaeologists. The results of the debate drastically changed the practice of Paleolithic archaeology as it is practiced by both sides of the debate. She left both anthropology and Binford in 1969.

== Later career ==
She became an important sexual liberation and feminist pioneer in the 1970s and 1980s. She was in a relationship with a woman, Jan, for several years, and published on feminist articles about both anthropology and modern politics. Sally co-organised the first Old Lesbian Conference in San Francisco in 1989.

At age 69, Binford died by suicide.

== Legacy ==
The artist Gabriella Ripley-Phipps curated the participatory event and mixed media video installation The Archival Dinner Party in 2009.

== Selected publications ==
- Binford, S.R. 1982. Myths and matriarchies. In C. Spretnak (1982). The Politics of Women's Spirituality.
- Binford, S.R. 1982. "Counter-response". In C. Spretnak (1982). The Politics of Women's Spirituality. 558–59.
- Binford, S.R. and Binford, L. 1969. Stone Tools and Human Behavior. Scientific American 220(4): 70–87.
- Binford, S.R. and Binford, L. 1968. New Perspectives in Archaeology. Chicago: Aldine Publishing.
- Binford, S.R. 1968. Early Upper Pleistocene Adaptations in the Levant. American Anthropologist 70(4): 707–717.
- Binford, S.R. 1968. Ethnographic Data and Understanding the Pleistocene. In R. B. Lee and I. DeVore (Eds.), Man the Hunter, Chicago (Aldine Publishing Company) 1968, pp. 274–275.
- Binford, S.R. 1968. Variability and change in the Near Eastern Mousterian of Levallois facies. In New Perspectives in Archaeology.
- Binford, L. and Binford, S.R. 1966. The predatory revolution: a consideration of the evidence for a new subsistence level. American Anthropologist 68(2): 508–512.
- Binford, L. and Binford, S. 1966. A Preliminary Analysis of Functional Variability in the Mousterian of Levallois Facies. American Anthropologist 68(2): 238–295.
- Binford, S.R. 1966. Me'arat Shovakh (Mugharet esh-Shubbabiq). Israel Exploration Journal 16(1): 18–32.
