= Mervyn Meggitt =

Australian anthropologist (1924–2004)

Mervyn John Meggitt
- Born: 08 August, 1924
- Died: 13 November 2004
- Occupation: Anthropologist

Academic background
- Education: University of Sydney

Academic work
- Discipline: Anthropology

Mervyn John Meggitt (20 August 1924 – 13 November 2004 New York State) was an Australian anthropologist and one of the pioneering researchers of highland Papua New Guinea and of Indigenous Australian cultures.

== Early life ==
Born in Warwick, Queensland and educated at the Anglican Church Grammar School (formerly the Church of England Grammar School) in Brisbane, Meggitt served in the Royal Australian Navy during the Second World War. Following demobilisation, he studied psychology and anthropology at the University of Sydney, and between 1953 and 1979, on the suggestion of A. P. Elkin, he carried out research amongst the Warlpiri (Walbiri) of Central Australia and the people of Engan Province, Papua New Guinea.

== Teaching ==
Throughout the 1950s he was a lecturer in anthropology at Sydney, but in the 1960s he took up a position as a professor of anthropology at the City University of New York. His works include The Lineage System of the Mae Engan and Desert People: A Study of the Walbiri Aborigines of Australia. But perhaps his most noted work is "Blood is Their Argument," an intensive analysis of the warfare habits of the Engan tribes. The book is widely considered to be among the first ethnographic studies of warfare.

In his work on the people of Enga in Papua New Guinea Meggitt found a firmly patrilineal system. This was unusual as compared to other highland groups, which tended to be organized on a basis of residence as well as descent. Restudies of his material as well the Engan suggest that Meggitt overstated the case, and the Engan may be more like other highland groups than was thought in previous decades. In his 1970 doctoral dissertation, Arthur Saxe used Meggitt's observations to form the basis of what became known as the Saxe–Goldstein hypothesis, a general prediction about the relationship between social organization and funerary practices.
