= Middle-range theory (archaeology) =

Archaeological framework

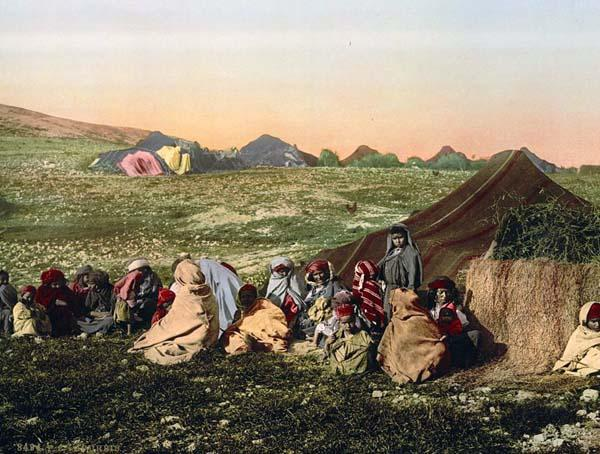
Middle-range theory has been applied in the archaeology of nomadic peoples, amongst others

In archaeology, middle-range theory refers to theories linking human behaviour and natural processes to physical remains in the archaeological record. It allows archaeologists to make inferences in the other direction: from archaeological finds in the present to behaviours in the past. Middle range theories are derived from ethnoarchaeology and experimental research in combination with the study of taphonomic processes.

== Background and application ==
The term was borrowed from the middle-range theory in sociology by Lewis Binford. He conducted ethnographic fieldwork amongst modern hunter-gatherer peoples such as the Nunamiut, the Navajo, and Aboriginal Australians in order to understand the pattern of waste their activities generated. He then used this data to infer the behaviour of Palaeolithic hunter-gatherers from the waste they left in the archaeological record.

Binford and many of his contemporaries viewed the construction of middle-range theories as a fundamental first step in understanding how people in the past behaved. However, middle-range research has since been criticized as logically flawed. Its critics argued that it rested on the unjustified assumption that there is a uniform link between behaviour and physical remains that holds true throughout human history. Its conclusions were argued to be untestable because their application was founded on a tautology: evidence from contemporary peoples (e.g. modern hunter-gatherers) was asserted to be applicable to people in the past (e.g. Palaeolithic hunter-gatherers) because they behaved in a similar way, but that same evidence was used to reconstruct the behaviour of the past people.

== Middle-range theory ==
The middle-range theory in archaeology is narrowly conceived in current conception and negated in use. Theory building began to gain traction in the late 1970s in the time of New Archaeology and took several years to be a topic of critical interest. The concept is often misunderstood because of the multiplicity of the middle-range theory in another scholarly discipline – sociology. It is suggested in this approach that scientific knowledge becomes tied with emerging research studies and in turn into a middle-range abstraction.

Binford's structure for middle-range theory consists of four components: 1) documentation of causal relations between relevant dynamics and observable statics; 2) recognition of signature patterns in static remains; 3) inference of past dynamics from observation of signature patterns in archaeological record; and, 4) evaluation of these inferences.

In archaeology, Binford's method states that a strong relation to natural science will withstand close evaluation in that the theories and evidence should tie together. The connection between the history of the past and the material remains recovered in the present can be regimented to present the best inference. It's the explanatory element of archaeology though many critique it was being too arbitrary. The validity of the theories are often in question and because archaeology is not an exact science, the theories can not be tested rigorously to prove otherwise. The falls middle-range theory are on par with archaeology and anthropology as a whole because only small segments of people and material can be studied to produce an accurate depiction of past life. A general, global scope isn't possible.
