= David L. Clarke =

English archaeologist and academic (1937–1976)

- Born: 3 November 1937
- Died: 27 June 1976 (aged 38)

Academic background
- Education: Peterhouse, Cambridge
- Doctoral advisor: Grahame Clark

Academic work
- Discipline: Archaeology
- Institutions: Peterhouse, Cambridge

David Leonard Clarke (3 November 1937 – 27 June 1976) was an English archaeologist and academic. He is known for his work on processual archaeology.

== Early life and education ==
Clarke was born in Kent, England. He studied at Peterhouse, Cambridge, from which he obtained his PhD in 1964 under the supervision of Grahame Clark.

== Academic career ==
He became a Fellow of Peterhouse in 1966. His teaching and writing, particularly in analytical archaeology in 1967, transformed European archaeology in the 1970s. It demonstrated the importance of systems theory, quantification, and scientific reasoning in archaeology, and drew ecology, geography, and comparative anthropology firmly within the ambit of the subject. Never really accepted by the Cambridge hierarchy, he was nevertheless loved by his students for his down-to-earth, inclusive attitudes toward them. In 1970, he published his PhD thesis about British and Irish Bell Beaker pottery.

In 1975 and 1976 Clarke led an excavation of the Great Wilbraham causewayed enclosure, near Cambridge.

Clarke died in 1976 as a result of thrombosis arising from a gangrenous twisted gut.

== Selected works ==
- Clarke, David L. (1968). Analytical Archaeology. Methuen. ISBN 0-416-42850-9.
- Clarke, David L. (1970). Beaker Pottery of Great Britain and Ireland. Cambridge: Cambridge University Press. p. 576. ISBN 0-521-07249-2.
- Clarke, David L. (1972). Models in Archaeology. London: Methuen. ISBN 0-416-16540-0.
- Clarke, David L. (1973). "Archaeology: the Loss of Innocence". Antiquity. 47 (185): 6–18. doi:10.1017/s0003598x0003461x.
- Clarke, David L. (1977). Spatial Archaeology. Boston: Academic Press. ISBN 0-12-175750-1.
- Clarke, David L. (1979). Analytical Archaeologist: Collected Papers of David L. Clarke. Boston: Academic Press. ISBN 0-12-175760-9.

== Referenced Publications ==
- Evans, Christopher; Edmonds, Mark; Boreham, Steve (2006). "'Total Archaeology' and Model Landscapes: Excavation of the Great Wilbraham Causewayed Enclosure, Cambridgeshire, 1975-76". Proceedings of the Prehistoric Society. 72: 113–162. doi:10.1017/S0079497X00000803.
- Quote from David Clarke, from his 1973 article in Antiquity called The Loss of Innocence. Antiquity 47:100.
- Guidi, Alessandro (1 September 1998). "Clarke in Mediterranean Archaeology : David Clarke's 'Archaeology : The Loss of Innocence' (1973) 25 Years After". Antiquity. 72 (277): 678–680. doi:10.1017/S0003598X00087093. ISSN 0003-598X. Archived from the original on 6 June 2007 – via HighBeam Research.
