= Marilyn Masson =

Maya archaeologist (born 1958)

Marilyn Masson (born 1958) is a Maya archaeologist whose research has focused on social transformation and political economy of ancient Mesoamerican cultures in Mexico and Belize. She is a professor of Mesoamerican archaeology at the University at Albany, SUNY. She is a co-director of the PEMY (Proyecto los Fundamentos Ecónomico de Mayapán/Economic Foundations of Mayapán Project ) project at the site of Mayapan in the Northern Yucutan Peninsula of Mexico.

== Education and academic career ==
According to her curriculum vitae Marilyn Masson earned her Bachelor of Arts in anthropology from Texas A&M University in 1982, her Master of Science in anthropology from Florida State University in 1987, and her Ph.D. in anthropology from the University of Texas at Austin in 1993. Her Ph.D. dissertation is titled Changes in Maya Community Organization from the Classic to Postclassic Periods: A View from Laguna de On, Belize. Her Master's thesis focused on lithic production changes in Late Classic Maya workshops at the site of Colha in Belize. She has a wide array of archaeological interests including household archaeology, ancient urbanism, archaeological political economy, craft production, zooarchaeology, lithic and ceramic analysis, and the archaeology of religion.

Most of her academic career has been spent teaching as an Assistant Professor (1996-2002), an Associate Professor (2002–2011) and as Professor (2011 to present) at the University of Albany SUNY. She has taught and teaches a variety of undergraduate and graduate level classes, including Aztec Inca Maya, Maya Art and Archaeology, Stone Tool Analysis, Zooarchaeology, Archaeological Lab Methods, The Archaeology of Urban Life, Current Theories on the Ancient Maya, and Ethnohistory and Archaeology.

Prior to earning her Ph.D., she spent time working as an archaeologist in Florida and Texas.

== Mesoamerican research ==
Masson has worked extensively throughout the southern Mexico/Maya region. She has directed the Belize Postclassic Project (1996-2002) and the Economic Foundations of Mayapan project (2001 to present). Earlier in her career, she participated in research at sites in Belize such as Colha, Kichpanha, K'axob, and also in Oaxaca.

The newest phase of her research focuses on regional and temporal variation in the northern Plains of Yucatán in the environs of the city of Mayapan. This focus examines rural-urban relationships of the Classic to Postclassic period, specifically to determine degrees of wealth, trade dependency, and occupational diversification at rural houselots and commoner dwellings at minor centers. These provide an important complement to her team's prior work within the walled urban zone of Mayapan that exhibits considerable inter-household and inter-regional dependencies on exchange, as well as pronounced commoner wealth and occupational variation. Reconstructing ancient economies must consider urban-rural dependencies and patterns for a more robust view. In 2013 she co-directed the Mayapan LiDAR project with Tim Hare (Morehead State University, Carlos Peraza (INAH Yucatán) and Brad Russell (College of St. Rose). This work identified abundant, nearly continuous (low density) distributions of houses (of multiple time periods) across a 40 km^{2} zone beyond the city walls. Her work in 2015 with this team excavated eight houses (four Terminal Classic, four Postclassic) in the hinterland outside of the city walls. These efforts to document and compare rural economies to urban ones, and to adopt a regional, rather than site-level approach, will continue in forthcoming years.

== Mayapan ==
Current work at Mayapan is conducted within the scope of the Economic Foundations of Mayapán Project (PEMY), funded by the Foundation for the Advancement of Mesoamerican Studies, the National Science Foundation, National Geographic, the Center for Social and Demographic Analysis, and the College of Arts and Sciences (UAlbany SUNY).

== Awards, honors and grants ==
- September 2003 Chancellor’s Award for Teaching Excellence (SUNY-wide)

== Books and journal publications ==
=== Books ===
- 2014 Masson, M., & Lope, C. P. Kukulkan's Realm: Urban Life at Ancient Mayapán. University Press of Colorado.
- 2002 Masson, Marilyn A. and David A. Freidel, editors. 2002 Ancient Maya Political Economies. Altamira Press, Walnut Creek, California.
- 2000 Masson, Marilyn A. In the Realm of Nachan Kan: Postclassic Maya Archaeology at Laguna de On, Belize. University Press of Colorado, Boulder.
- 2000 Smith, Michael E. and Marilyn A. Masson, editors. 2000 Ancient Civilizations of Mesoamerica: A Reader. Blackwell Press, Malden.

=== Journals (since 2001) ===
- Freidel, David A., Marilyn A. Masson, and Michelle Rich 2016 Imagining a Complex Maya Political Economy: Counting Tokens and Currencies in Image, Text, and the Archaeological Record. Cambridge Archaeological Journal. published online October 2016.
- Hoggarth, Julie A., Sebastian F.M. Breitenbach, Brendan J. Culleton, Claire E. Ebert, Marilyn A. Masson, Douglas J. Kennett 2015 The Political Collapse of Chichén Itzá in climatic and cultural context. Global and Planetary Change 138:25-32. https://dx.doi.org/10.1016/j.gloplacha.2015.12.007.
- Masson, Marilyn A., Timothy S. Hare, Carlos Peraza Lope, Bárbara C. Escamilla Ojeda, Elizabeth Paris, Betsy Kohut, Bradley W. Russell, and Wilberth Cruz Alvarado 2016 Household Craft Production in the Prehispanic Urban Setting of Mayapán, Yucatán, Mexico. Journal of Archaeological Research. 24:1-46.
- Hare, Timothy S., Marilyn A. Masson, and Bradley W. Russell 2014 High-Density LiDAR Mapping of the Ancient City of Mayapán. Remote Sensing 2014(6):9064-9085. doi:10.3390/rs6099064.
- Jiménez-Cano, Nayeli G. and Marilyn A. Masson 2016 Estimation of fish size from archaeological bones of hardhead catfishes (Ariopsis felis): Assessing pre-Hispanic fish acquisition of two Mayan sites. Journal of Archaeological Science 8:116-120.
- Masson, Marilyn A. 2012 Maya Collapse Cycles. Proceedings of the National Academy of Sciences 109:18237-18238. (Invited commentary)
- Masson, Marilyn A. and David A. Freidel 2012 An Argument for Classic Era Maya Market Exchange. Journal of Anthropological Archaeology 31:455-484.
- Masson, Marilyn A. and Carlos Peraza Lope 2008 Animal Use at Mayapan. Quaternary International. 191:170-183.
- Marilyn A. Masson and Carlos Peraza Lope 2007 Kukulkan/Quetzalcoatl, Death God, and Creation Mythology of Burial Shaft Temples at Mayapán. Mexicon XXIX (3):77-85.
- Peraza Lope, Carlos, Marilyn A. Masson, Timothy S. Hare, and Pedro Candelario Delgado Kú 2006 The Late Postclassic Chronology of Mayapán: New Radiocarbon Evidence. Ancient Mesoamerica 17:153-176.
- Masson, Marilyn A. and Robert M. Rosenswig 2005 Production Characteristics of Postclassic Maya Pottery from Caye Coco, Northern Belize Latin American Antiquity 16:355-384.
- Masson, Marilyn A. and Robert M. Rosenswig. 2003. The Evolution of Postclassic Maya Pottery Traditions in Northern Belize. Submitted to Latin American Antiquity
- Masson, Marilyn A. 2001. Changing Patterns of Ceramic Stylistic Diversity in the Pre-Hispanic Maya Lowlands. Acta Archaeologica 72:159-188.
- Robert M. Rosenswig and Marilyn A. Masson. 2002. Postclassic Maya Monumental* Architecture from Caye Coco, Northern Belize. Ancient Mesoamerica 13:1-23.
- Masson, Marilyn A. 2001. The Economic Organization of Late and Terminal Classic Period Maya Stone Tool Craft Specialist Workshops at Colha, Belize. Lithic Technology 26:29-49.
- Masson, Marilyn A. 2001. El Sobrenatural Cocijo y Poder de Linaje en La Antigua Sociedad Zapoteca. Mesoamerica 41:1-30.
