= Lynne Goldstein =

American archaeologist (born 1953)

- Born: September 18, 1953 (age 72)
- Died: April 18, 2026; Arizona
- Citizenship: United States
- Education: Beloit College; Northwestern University
- Known for: Fort Ross, California, cemetery excavations

Lynne Goldstein (born September 18, 1953- died April 18, 2026) was an American archaeologist, known for her work in mortuary analysis, Midwestern archaeology, campus archaeology, repatriation policy, and archaeology and social media. She was a professor of anthropology at Michigan State University and was the editor of American Antiquity between 1995 and 2000.

== Education ==
Goldstein received her Ph.D. from Northwestern University in 1976 with a dissertation titled Spatial Structure and Social Organizations: Regional Manifestations of Mississippian Society. In this dissertation and a subsequent summarising article, she re-analysed "Hypothesis 8", a prediction made by Arthur Saxe as to the relationship between the use of formal cemeteries and the organisation of a society, and reframed it:

If there is a formal bounded disposal area, used exclusively for the dead, then the culture is probably one which has a corporate group structure in the form of a lineal descent system. The more organised and formal the disposal area is, the more conclusive this interpretation.

Goldstein's formulation of the hypothesis largely displaced that of Saxe, with the result that it became generally known as the Saxe–Goldstein hypothesis.

== Career ==
Goldstein's research focuses on mortuary analysis and she was influential in the development of US policy on the repatriation of human remains.She also works on campus archaeology, digital archaeology, public archaeology, archaeological ethics, spatial analysis and statistics. Regionally, Goldstein is known for her work in the Midwest, especially the Aztalan site in Wisconsin, and for her work on the historic cemetery at Fort Ross, California.

Goldstein was professor and chair of the department of anthropology at Michigan State University from 1996 to 2006. During her time as chair she ran a field school at the Aztalan site. In 2005 Goldstein, along with fellow archaeologists J. O’Gorman and K. Lewis, contributed to the sesquicentennial celebration of MSU by conducting a public field school that excavated the first dormitory on campus known as Saints’ Rest.

After stepping down as chair, Goldstein became the department's graduate program director, a position she held from 2010 to 2017. In 2007 she launched the Campus Archaeology Program to promote public awareness of heritage and the value of archaeology, as well as provide student training in public archaeology. Goldstein jointly received the AT&T Instructional Technology Award for the use and integration of social media with an on-campus field school in 2012.

== Honors and awards ==
- 2015 Distinguished Career Award, Midwest Archaeological Conference.
- 2010 Curator Emeritus, Board of Curators, Wisconsin Historical Society.
- 2000 President's Award for Exceptional Service to the Profession, Society for American Archaeology.
- 1995 President's Award for Exceptional Service to the Profession, Society for American Archaeology.
- 1991 President's Award for Exceptional Service to the Profession, Society for American Archaeology.
- 1992 President's Award for Exceptional Service to the Profession, American Anthropological Association
