= Liv Nilsson Stutz =

Archaeologist

Academic background
- Education: Lund University

Liv Nilsson Stutz is a full professor at Linnaeus University. She is a bioarchaeologist and archaeologist.

== Education ==
She received her PhD in 2004 from Lund University.

== Career ==
Nilsson Stutz is an editor of the journal Archaeological Dialogues. She was a panellist in the plenary session of the 2019 TAG conference.

== Selected publications ==
- Nilsson Stutz, Liv. 2003. Embodied Rituals and Ritualized Bodies: Tracing Ritual Practices in Late Mesolithic Burials.
- Nilsson Stutz, Liv. 2008. More than metaphor: approaching the human cadaver in archaeology. BAR INTERNATIONAL SERIES.
- Nilsson Stutz, Liv. 2007. Archaeology, Identity and the Right to Culture. Anthropological perspectives on repatriation. Current Swedish Archaeology 15: 1–16.
- Nilsson Stutz, Liv. 2010. The way we bury our dead. Reflections on mortuary ritual, community and identity at the time of the Mesolithic-Neolithic transition
- Nilsson Stutz, Liv. 2013. Claims to the past. A critical view of the arguments driving repatriation of cultural heritage and their role in contemporary identity politics. Journal of Intervention and Statebuilding.
- S. Tarlow and L. Nilsson Stutz (eds) 2013 The Oxford Handbook of the Archaeology of Death and Burial. Oxford: Oxford University Press.
- Liv Nilsson Stutz 2018. A Future for Archaeology: In Defense of an Intellectually Engaged, Collaborative and Confident Archaeology. Norwegian Archaeological Review 51(1–2): 48–56, DOI: 10.1080/00293652.2018.1544168
