= Sarah Tarlow =

British archaeologist

- Born: 1967 (age 58–59)
- Occupations: Archaeologist, academic

Academic background
- Education: Sheffield University; Cambridge University

Academic work
- Discipline: Historical archaeology
- Institutions: University of Leicester; University of Wales, Lampeter
- Notable works: The Oxford Handbook of the Archaeology of Death and Burial

Sarah Tarlow is a British archaeologist and academic. As professor of historical archaeology at the University of Leicester, Tarlow is best known for her work on the archaeology of death and burial. In 2012, Tarlow was awarded the chair in archaeology at the University of Leicester.

== Early life and education ==
Sarah Tarlow was born in 1967. She obtained a BA in 1989 from Sheffield University, a MPhil (1990) and a PhD (1995) from Cambridge University.

== Career ==
Tarlow taught at the University of Wales, Lampeter from 1995 to 2000. In 2000, she became a lecturer in Historical archaeology at the University of Leicester, and in 2006 was promoted to senior lecturer. In 2012, Tarlow was awarded the chair in archaeology.

Tarlow's research focuses on the historical archaeology of Great Britain and Northern Europe. She has published several books, journals and edited anthologies on the archaeology of death and burial, including the Handbook of the Archaeology of Death and Burial (Oxford Handbooks). Tarlow also studies the archaeology of emotion and issues of archaeological ethics.

From 2011 to 2016, Tarlow directed the large-scale research project, Harnessing the Power of the Criminal Corpse, funded by the Wellcome Trust. The study focused on the period between the sixteenth century and the twentieth century, and investigated the management, treatment and uses of the criminal corpse in Britain. The project's overall goal was an examination and discussion of the "changing ideas of self and person as they relate to the body".

Tarlow is a member of the editorial advisory board of the archaeology journal Antiquity.

== Writing ==
Tarlow's memoir, The Archaeology of Loss: Life, love and the art of dying (Picador, 2023)) is about caring for her husband, also an archaeologist, Mark Pluciennik, who had a progressive neurological illness affecting his brain and his functioning. Pluciennik died by suicide in 2016. Tarlow writes about finding it difficult to accept her role as his carer, and about how exhausting caring for him was, as well as about her grief. She is an advocate of assisted dying.

== Selected publications ==
=== Journals ===
- Tarlow, Sarah (8 January 2024). "The Names of the Dead: Identity, Privacy and the Ethics of Anonymity in Exhibiting the Dead Body". Public Archaeology: 1–20. doi:10.1080/14655187.2023.2268384..
- Tarlow, Sarah (2016). "Curious afterlives: the enduring appeal of the criminal corpse". Mortality (Abingdon, England). 21 (3): 210–228. doi:10.1080/13576275.2016.1181328. PMC 4917903. PMID 27366110..
- Tarlow, Sarah (2014). "The Technology of the Gibbet". International Journal of Historical Archaeology. 18 (4): 668–699. doi:10.1007/s10761-014-0275-0. PMC 4372825. PMID 25834380.
- Tarlow, Sarah (2000). "Emotion in Archaeology". Current Anthropology. 41 (5): 713–746. doi:10.1086/317404. S2CID 147669942.
- Tarlow, Sarah (2000). "Landscapes of memory: the nineteenth century garden cemetery". European Journal of Archaeology. 3 (2): 217–239. doi:10.1179/eja.2000.3.2.217. S2CID 232175475.

=== Books ===
- Tarlow, Sarah (2023). The Archaeology of Loss: life, love and the art of dying. Picador. ISBN 9781529099539..
- Tarlow, Sarah; Battell Lowman, Emma (2018). Harnessing the Power of the Criminal Corpse. Palgrave Historical Studies in the Criminal Corpse and its Afterlife. Palgrave MacMillan.
- Tarlow, Sarah (2017). The Golden and Ghoulish Age of the Gibbet in Britain. Palgrave Historical Studies in the Criminal Corpse and its Afterlife). Palgrave MacMillan.
- Tarlow, Sarah (2015). The Archaeology of Death in Post-medieval Europe. Sciendo. ISBN 978-3110439724.
- Tarlow, Sarah (2013). Ritual, Belief and the Dead in Early Modern Britain and Ireland. Cambridge University Press. ISBN 978-1107667983.
- Tarlow, Sarah; Nilsson, Liv, eds. (2013). The Oxford Handbook of the Archaeology of Death and Burial (Oxford Handbooks). Oxford University Press. ISBN 978-0199569069.
- Tarlow, Sarah (2007). The Archaeology of Improvement: Britain 1750–1850. Cambridge University Press.
- Tarlow, Sarah (1999). Bereavement and Commemoration, An Archaeology of Mortality. Wiley-Blackwell. ISBN 978-0631206149.
- Tarlow, Sarah; West, Susie (1999). Familiar Past?: Archaeologies of Later Historical Britain. Routledge. ISBN 978-0415188050.
