= Lewis Binford =

American archaeologist (1931–2011)

Lewis R. Binford
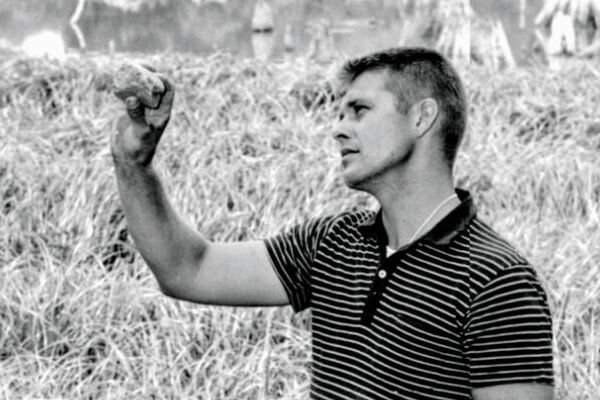
- Binford in 1955, surveying an archaeological site in Princess Anne County, Virginia
- Born: November 21, 1931; Norfolk, Virginia
- Died: April 11, 2011 (aged 79); Kirksville, Missouri
- Education: Virginia Tech; University of North Carolina; University of Michigan
- Known for: Pioneering processual archaeology and ethnoarchaeology Significant contributions to study of the Paleolithic
- Scientific career
- Fields: Archaeology, Anthropology
- Workplaces: University of Chicago; University of New Mexico; Southern Methodist University

Lewis Roberts Binford (November 21, 1931 – April 11, 2011) was an American archaeologist known for his influential work in archaeological theory, ethnoarchaeology and the Paleolithic archaeology. He is widely considered among the most influential archaeologists of the later 20th century, and is credited with fundamentally changing the field with the introduction of processual archaeology (or the "New Archaeology") in the 1960s. Binford, a highly productive writer, who achieved an extraordinary level influence in ideas, methodology, and behavioral research internationally, a legacy that continues to the present. His influence was controversial, however, as he seemed to pit theoretical work in archaeology in the late 1980s and 1990s as either a reaction to or in support of the processual paradigm. Recent appraisals remain split, some judging his contributions mainly in terms of his innovative ideas and approaches, and others focusing on the fact that his approach owed more to prior work in the 1940s and 50s than he recognized.

== Early life and education ==
Binford was born in Norfolk, Virginia, on November 21, 1931. As a child he was interested in animals, and after finishing high school at Matthew Fontaine Maury High School studied wildlife biology at the Virginia Polytechnic Institute. Previously a mediocre student, Binford excelled in college and considered pursuing an academic career in biology until he was put off the idea when a professor suggested that there were "still a few species of blind cave salamanders" that he could be the first to study. It was during his time in the military that Binford first became interested in anthropology and archaeology. After graduating he was drafted as an interpreter and assigned to a group of anthropologists tasked with resettling people on the Pacific islands occupied by the United States during World War II. He also became involved with the recovery of archaeological material from tombs on Okinawa that were to be removed to make way for a military base. Though he had no training in archaeology, Binford found himself excavating and identifying these artifacts, which were then used to restock the destroyed museum in Shuri.

After leaving the military Binford went to study anthropology at the University of North Carolina (UNC). The military subsidy he received was not enough to fund his study completely, so Binford used the skills in construction he learned from his father (a carpenter) to start a modest contracting business. He gained a second BA at UNC and then in 1957 transferred to the University of Michigan to complete a combined MA and PhD. His thesis used ethnohistorical and archaeological data to investigate the dynamic interaction between Native Americans and the first English colonists in Virginia, including the Powhatan (Wahunsonacook) Confederacy, a subject he became interested in while still at UNC.

== New Archaeology ==
Binford first became dissatisfied with the present state of archaeology while an undergraduate at UNC. He felt that culture history reflected the same 'stamp collecting' mentality that had turned him away from biology. At Michigan, he saw a sharp contrast between the "excitement" of the anthropology department's cultural anthropologists (which included Leslie White) and the "people in white coats counting their potsherds" in the Museum of Anthropology. His first academic position was as an assistant professor at the University of Chicago, where he taught New World archaeology and statistical methods in archaeology. Shortly after his appointment he wrote his first major article, Archaeology as Anthropology (1962), which was stimulated by problems in archaeological methodology that had become apparent with the use of radiocarbon dating to verify the dates and cultural typologies generated with relative dating techniques such as seriation. Binford criticised what he saw as a tendency to treat artifacts as undifferentiated traits, and to explain variations in these traits only in terms of cultural diffusion. He proposed that the goal of archaeology was exactly the same as that of anthropology more generally, viz. to "explicate and explain the total range of physical and cultural similarities and differences characteristic of the entire spatio-temporal span of man's existence." This would be achieved by relating artifacts to human behavior, and behavior to cultural systems (as understood by his mentor, cultural anthropologist Leslie White).

Several other archaeologists at Chicago shared Binford's ideas, a group their critics began calling the "New Archaeologists". In 1966 they presented a set of papers at a meeting of the Society for American Archaeology which were later collected in the landmark volume New Perspectives in Archaeology (1968), edited by Binford and his then wife Sally, also an archaeologist. By the time this volume was published he had left Chicago – dismissed, according to Binford, because of increasing tension between himself and the senior archaeologists in the faculty, particularly Robert Braidwood. He moved to the University of California, Santa Barbara for a year and then on to UCLA. He did not like the atmosphere at UCLA's large faculty, and so took the opportunity to relocate to the University of New Mexico in 1969.

== Ethnoarchaeology ==
Binford withdrew from the theoretical debates that followed the rapid adoption of New Archaeology (by then also called processual archaeology) in the 1960s and 70s, instead focusing on his work on the Mousterian, a Middle Palaeolithic lithic industry found in Europe, North Africa and the Near East. Interested in how to translate human behavior from patterns in the archeological record, he began ethnoarchaeology fieldwork among the Nunamiut in Alaska, a research choice based on periglacial environments similar to those occupied by Mousterian humans during the Pleistocene. The objective was to see first hand how hunter-gatherer behavior is reflected in material remains and to build interpretive methodologies from this kind of experience. Conducting ethnographic fieldwork to establish firm correlations between behavior and material culture is known as ethnoarchaeology, and while not being invented by Binford, was shaped significantly by his incorporation with Processual (New) Archaeology. Most of Binford's later work was focused on the lifeways of Palaeolithic humans, and in parallel the diversity of hunter-gatherer societies in the historic and prehistoric periods.

== Later career ==
Binford joined the Southern Methodist University faculty in 1991, after teaching and training students for 23 years as a distinguished professor at the University of New Mexico.

Binford's last published book, Constructing Frames of Reference (2001), was edited by his then wife, Nancy Medaris Stone. His wife at the time of his death, Amber Johnson, has said that she and a colleague will finish editing a book Binford had in progress at the time of his death.

He died on April 11, 2011, in Kirksville, Missouri, at the age of 79.

== Personal life ==
Binford was married six times. His first marriage was to Jean Riley Mock, with whom he had his only daughter, Martha. Binford also had a son, Clinton, who died as a result of injuries sustained in a car accident in 1976. He frequently collaborated with his third wife, Sally Binford, who was also an archaeologist; the couple married while they were graduate students at the University of Chicago, and co-edited New Perspectives in Archaeology (1968), among other works. After his marriage to Sally ended, Binford married Mary Ann Howell nee Wilson, an elementary school teacher. His fifth wife was Nancy Medaris Stone, an archaeologist. At the time of his death he was married to Amber Johnson, professor of anthropology at Truman State University who had worked with Binford as a research student at Southern Methodist University.

== Influence ==
Binford is mainly known for his contributions to archaeological theory and his promotion of ethnoarchaeological research. As a leading advocate of the "New Archaeology" movement of the 1960s, he proposed a number of ideas that became central to processual archaeology. Binford and other New Archaeologists argued that there should be a greater application of scientific methodologies and the hypothetico-deductive method in archaeology. He placed a strong emphasis on generalities and how human beings interact with their ecological niche, defining culture as the extrasomatic means of adaptation. This view reflected the influence of his PhD supervisor, Leslie White. Binford's work can largely be seen as a reaction to the earlier culture history approach to archaeology. New Archaeology was considered a revolution in archaeological theory.

Binford was involved in several high-profile debates, including arguments with James Sackett on the nature and function of style and on symbolism and methodology with Ian Hodder. Binford spoke out and reacted to a number of schools of thought, particularly the post-processual school, the behavioural school, and symbolic and postmodern anthropologies. Binford was also known for a friendlier rivalry with French archaeologist François Bordes, with whom he argued over the interpretation of Mousterian sites. Binford's disagreement with Bordes over the interpretation of Mousterian stone artifacts provided the impetus for much of Binford's theoretical work. Bordes interpreted variability in Mousterian assemblages as evidence of different tribes, while Binford felt that a functional interpretation of the different assemblages would be more appropriate. His subsequent inability to explain the Mousterian facies using a functional approach led to his ethnoarchaeological work among the Nunamiut and the development of his middle-range theory.

== Awards and recognition ==
Binford was elected to the National Academy of Sciences in 2001. He also received a Lifetime Achievement Award in 2008 from the Society for American Archaeology and an honorary doctorate from Leiden University. There is an asteroid named Binford in his honor.

== Works ==
- Constructing frames of reference:an analytical method for archaeological theory building using hunter-gatherer and environmental data sets Berkeley: University of California Press, (2001) ISBN 0-520-22393-4
- Debating Archaeology San Diego: Academic Press, (1989) ISBN 0-12-100045-1
- Faunal Remains from Klasies River Mouth (1984) ISBN 0-12-100070-2
- Working at Archaeology (Studies in Archaeology) (1983) ISBN 978-0-12-100060-8
- In Pursuit of the Past: Decoding the Archaeological Record (1983) ISBN 0-520-23339-5
- Bones, Ancient Men and Modern Myths (1981) ISBN 0-12-100035-4
- Nunamiut Ethnoarchaeology (1978) ISBN 0-12-100040-0
- An archaeological perspective New York: Seminar Press, (1972) ISBN 0-12-807750-6
- New Perspectives in Archaeology (1968) ISBN 0-202-33022-2
- Archaeology as Anthropology (1962)
