= Archaeological record =

Body of physical (i.e. not written) evidence about the past

The archaeological record is the body of physical (not written) evidence about the past. It is one of the core concepts in archaeology, the academic discipline concerned with documenting and interpreting the archaeological record. Archaeological theory is used to interpret the archaeological record for a better understanding of human cultures. The archaeological record can consist of the earliest ancient findings as well as contemporary artifacts. Human activity has had a large impact on the archaeological record. Destructive human processes, such as agriculture and land development, may damage or destroy potential archaeological sites. Other threats to the archaeological record include natural phenomena and scavenging. Archaeology can be a destructive science for the finite resources of the archaeological record are lost to excavation. Therefore, archaeologists limit the amount of excavation that they do at each site and keep meticulous records of what is found. The archaeological record is the physical record of human prehistory and history, of why ancient civilizations prospered or failed and why those cultures changed and grew. It is the story of the human world.

== Definitions ==
Scholars have frequently used in textual analogies such as 'record', 'source' and 'archive' to refer to material evidence of the past since at least the 19th century. The term 'archaeological record' probably originated this way, possibly via parallel concepts in geology (geologic record) or palaeontology (fossil record). The term was used regularly by V. Gordon Childe in the 1950s, and seems to have entered common parlance thereafter.

In the first critical review of the concept, philosopher Linda Patrik found that by the 1980s archaeologists conceptualised the term in at least five different ways:

1. As a "receptacle" for material deposits
2. As material deposits
3. As artefacts and objects
4. As a collection of samples
5. As reports written by archaeologists

Patrik argued that the first three definitions reflected a "physical model" of archaeological evidence, where it is seen as the direct result of physical processes that operated in the past (like the fossil record); in contrast, definitions four and five follow a "textual model", where the archaeological record is seen as encoding cultural information about the past (like historical texts). She highlighted the extent to which archaeologists' understanding of what constituted 'the archaeological record' was dependent on broader currents in archaeological theory, namely, that processual archaeologists were likely to subscribe to a physical model and postprocessual archaeologists a textual model.

Lucas condenses Patrik's list into three distinct definitions of the archaeological record:

1. The archaeological record is material culture
2. The archaeological record is the material remains of the past
3. The archaeological record is the sources used by archaeologists

=== As material culture ===
In its broadest sense, the archaeological record can be conceived as the total body of objects made by, used by, or associated with, humanity. This definition encompasses both artefacts (objects made or modified by humans) and ecofacts (natural objects associated with human activity). In this sense, it is equivalent to material culture, and includes not just 'ancient' remains but the physical things associated with contemporary societies.

This definition, which emphasizes the materiality of the archaeological record and aligns archaeology with material culture studies and the 'material turn' in cultural anthropology, has become increasingly common with the rise of post-processual archaeology.

=== As material remains ===
More conservative definitions specify that the archaeological record consists of the "remains", "traces" or "residues" of past human activity, although the dividing line between 'the past' and 'the present' may not be well-defined. This view is particularly associated with processual archaeology, which saw the archaeological record as the "fossilised" product of physical, cultural and taphonomic processes that happened in the past, and focused on understanding those processes.

=== As sources ===
The archaeological record can also consist of the written documentation that is presented in scientific journals. It is what archaeologists have learned from the artifacts they have documented. This spans the entire world; archaeology is the human story that belongs to everyone's past and represents everyone's heritage. This data can be archived and retrieved by archaeologists for research. The mission of an archaeologist is often preservation of the archaeological record. There are different databases which are used to archive and preserve the documentation in addition to the artifacts which serve as archaeological records. One of these databases is The Digital Archaeological Record. The Digital Archaeological Record (tDAR) is an international digital repository for the digital records of archaeological investigations. tDAR's use, development, and maintenance are governed by Digital Antiquity, an organization dedicated to ensuring the long-term preservation of irreplaceable archaeological data and to broadening the access to these data. The archaeological record serves as a database for everything archaeology stands for and has become. The material culture associated with archaeological excavations and the scholarly records in academic journals are the physical embodiment of the archaeological record. The ambiguity that is associated with the archaeological record is often due to the lack of examples, but the archaeological record is everything the science of archaeology has found and created.

== Components ==
Components of the archaeological record include: artifacts, built structures, human impact on the environment, garbage, stratigraphy, mortuary practices, plant remains, or animal remains. Artifacts from the archaeological record are usually found in the ground, and once dug up, archaeologists put data such as photographs and exact location of the artifact into the archaeological record. Bones are sometimes found and included in the archaeological record. Bones can be from both animals and humans that have died and been preserved. Bone fragments and whole bones can be a part of the archaeological record. Plant and organic material found can also become a part of the archaeological record. Seeds are a common plant material that are found and included in the archaeological record. The seeds that archaeologists find are usually those that were burned during cooking, which helps to preserve them. Features are also part of the archaeological record, and are material culture that usually archaeologists are unable to take and study inside a lab. Features can include burn marks in the ground from fire pits or mounds and other structures constructed long ago. Features can also include mounds or other monuments that have been constructed by other civilizations.

== See also ==
- Geological record
- Cultural resources management and cultural heritage management
- Excavation (archaeology)
- Typology (archaeology)
