= Klavs Randsborg =

Danish archaeologist

Photo of Klavs Randsborg

Klavs Randsborg (28 February 1944 – 13 November 2016) was a Danish archaeologist. He was Professor of World Archaeology at the University of Copenhagen, where he spent most of his academic life. He was also at times Visiting Professor at various British, Dutch and German universities, as well as Washington University in St. Louis.

Randsborg was considered one of the world's leading figures in Scandinavian and world archaeology. He is best known for his research on the Nordic Bronze Age and Viking Age in Denmark. Throughout his career, Randsborg conducted archaeological excavations in the United States, Europe and Africa. From 1984 he was the editor of the archaeological journal Acta Archaeologica.

Randsborg died on 13 November 2016 at the age of 72.

== Selected works ==
- The First Millennium AD in Europe and the Mediterranean, 1991
- The Anatomy of Denmark, 2009
- The Archaeology of Death (New Directions in Archaeology), 2011
- Bronze Age Textiles (Debates in Archaeology), 2011
- Danskernes huse på Guldkysten 1659-1850 (antologi), 2011
- Roman Reflections (Debates in Archaeology), 2015
