= Processual archaeology =

Theoretical paradigm in archaeology

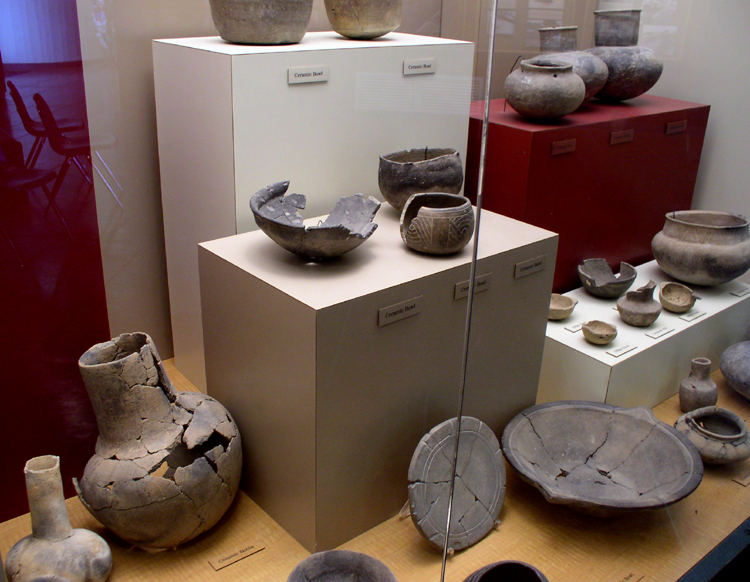
Processual archaeology originated in American archaeology, where analysing historical change over time had proved difficult with existing technology

Processual archaeology (formerly, the New Archaeology) is a form of archaeological theory. It had its beginnings in 1958 with the work of Gordon Willey and Philip Phillips, Method and Theory in American Archaeology, in which the pair stated that "American archaeology is anthropology, or it is nothing" (Willey and Phillips, 1958:2), a rephrasing of Frederic William Maitland's comment: "My own belief is that by and by, anthropology will have the choice between being history, and being nothing." The idea implied that the goals of archaeology were the goals of anthropology, which were to answer questions about humans and human culture. This was meant to be a critique of the former period in archaeology, the cultural-history phase in which archaeologists thought that information artifacts contained about past culture would be lost once the items became included in the archaeological record. Willey and Phillips believed all that could be done was to catalogue, describe, and create timelines based on the artifacts.

Proponents of processual archaeology claimed that the rigorous use of the scientific method made it possible to get past the limits of the archaeological record and to learn something about the lifestyles of those who created or used artifacts. Colin Renfrew, a proponent of processual archaeology, observed in 1987 that it focuses attention on "the underlying historical processes which are at the root of change". Archaeology, he noted, "has learnt to speak with greater authority and accuracy about the ecology of past societies, their technology, their economic basis and their social organization. Now it is beginning to interest itself in the ideology of early communities: their religions, the way they expressed rank, status and group identity."

== Theory ==
"New Archaeology represents a precipitate, unplanned and unfinished exploration of new disciplinary field space, conducted with very varied success in an atmosphere of complete uncertainty. What at first appeared to be merely a period of technical re-equipment has produced profound practical, theoretical and philosophical problems to which the new archaeologies have responded with diverse new methods, new observations, new paradigms and new theory. However, unlike its parent, the New Archaeology is as yet a set of questions rather than a set of answers; when the questions are answered it too will be Old Archaeology."

— Processualist David L. Clarke, 1973.

Processual archaeologists believe they can understand past cultural systems through the remains they left behind. One theory that influences this is Leslie White's theory that culture can be defined as the exosomatic (outside the body) means of environmental adaptation for humans. That is, archaeologists study cultural adaptation to environmental change rather than the humans' adaptation over generations, which is dealt with by evolutionary biologists. This focus on environmental adaptation is based on the cultural ecology and multilinear evolution ideas of anthropologists such as Julian Steward. In exosomatic adaptation, the culture is determined by its environmental constraints. As a result, processual archaeologists propose that cultural change happens within a set predictable framework, and they seek to understand the adaptation analyzing its components. Moreover, because the framework is predictable, science is the key to unlocking how those components interacted with the culture as a whole. Consequently, processual archaeologists hold that cultural changes are driven by evolutionary "processes" in cultural development. The resulting cultural changes would be adaptive relative to the environment. In this framework, the changes within the culture are not only understandable, but also scientifically predictable once the interaction of the variables is understood. In effect, archeologists should then be able to completely reconstruct these "cultural processes". Hence the name "processual archaeology", and its practitioners becoming known as "new archaeologists".

Scientifically however, the challenge facing proponents of New archaeology was developing a methodology of analyzing the archaeological remains in a more scientific fashion, as no such framework existed. The lack of this type of analysis in works of archeological science led Willey and Phillips to state in 1958, "So little work has been done in American archaeology on the explanatory level that it is difficult to find a name for it". Different researchers had alternative approaches to this problem. Lewis Binford felt that ethno-historical (history of peoples) information was necessary to facilitate an understanding of archaeological context. Ethno-historical research involves living and studying the life of those who would have used the artifacts—or at least studying a similar culture. Binford wanted to prove that the Mousterian assemblage, a group of stone artifacts from France during the ice age, was adapted to its environment. To prove this, Binford spent time with the Nunamiut of Alaska, a people living in conditions very similar to those of France during the period in question. Binford was successful with this approach, and though his specific problem ultimately eluded complete understanding, the ethno-historical work he did is often referred to by researchers today and has since been emulated by many.

The new methodological approaches of the processual research paradigm include logical positivism (the idea that all aspects of culture are accessible through the material record), the use of quantitative data, and the hypothetico-deductive model (scientific method of observation and hypothesis testing). An example of such hypothesis testing is the Saxe–Goldstein hypothesis, developed by Arthur Saxe and Lynne Goldstein in the 1970s, which predicted that the use of formal areas for the disposal of the dead would correlate with the degree to which a society contained corporate groups asserting rights to certain resources via claims of descent from the ancestors buried in them.

During the late 1960s and into the 1970s, archaeologist Kent Flannery began championing the idea that systems theory could be used in archaeology to approach questions of culture from an unbiased perspective, as the study focuses on the symbiotic whole of a culture rather than its parts, or artifacts. Systems theory however, proved to have problematic limitations for archaeology as a whole, in that it works well when describing how elements of a culture interact, but performs poorly when describing why they interact the way they do. Despite its lacking, systems theory has become a very important part of processualism, as it sets archaeologists with parameters to examine other cultures unique to its peoples, while limiting interference from the researcher's own cultural biases.

An example of processualism, in the field of paleolinguistics, Colin Renfrew—who in his 1987 re-examining of Proto-Indo-European language made a case for the spread of Indo-European languages through neolithic Europe in connection with the spread of farming—outlined three basic primary processes through which a language comes to be spoken in a specific area. These processes are initial colonization, replacement, and continuous development. Supported by linguistic analyses, accepted migration progressions, and archeological records, Renfrew proposed a radical new conclusion that contradicted long-held linguistic-origin theories. With Renfrew's proposal being far from conclusive, The New York Times published the findings, claiming that Renfrew's work has since been both supported and challenged in multiple studies by linguists, archaeologists, biologists, geneticists, statisticians, and computational mathematicians. Though Renfrew's conclusions still garner debate, the scientific understanding gained from the wide interdisciplinary studies demonstrates processual analyses of a complex topic provides valuable data that can be analyzed, refuted, and built upon to further understand cultural history.

== Further theoretical development ==
"Do these developments represent a 'New Archaeology'? Well of course it depends on the point of view of the observer and what the observer wishes to see. However, it does seem difficult to sustain the view that the character, scale and rapidity of recent change is of no greater significance than that experienced in other twenty-year spans of archaeological development. We seem rather to have witnessed an interconnected series of dramatic, intersecting and international developments which together may be taken to define new archaeologies within a New Archaeology; whether we choose to use these terms or avoid them is then mainly a personal, political and semantic decision."

— Processualist David L. Clarke, 1973.

In 1973, the processualist David Clarke of Cambridge University would publish an academic paper in Antiquity claiming that as a discipline, archaeology had moved from its original "noble innocence" through to "self-consciousness" and then onto "critical self-consciousness", a symptom of which was the development of the New Archaeology. As a result, he argued, archaeology had suffered a "loss of innocence" as archaeologists became skeptical of the work of their predecessors. Clarke's paper would later be described as "one of the seminal statements of the New Archaeology, by one of its leading proponents" in Britain, if not elsewhere, by the archaeologists Caroline Malone and Simon Stoddart.

Processualism's development transformed archaeology, and is sometimes called the "New Archaeology". With few notable exceptions such as Boston University, universities in America classify archaeology as a sub-discipline of anthropology, while in Europe it is thought to be a subject more like historical studies. It is important to analyze which sciences are related because such analysis highlights the questions of what archaeology ought to study and in what ways. Like the other social scientists, the New Archaeologists or processualists wanted to utilize scientific methodology in their work. Archaeology, and in particular archaeology of the historical period, has sometimes been allied more with humanities disciplines, such as Classics. The question of where to put archaeology as a discipline, and its concomitant issues of what archaeology ought to study and which methods it ought to use, likely played no small part in the emergence of post-processualism in Europe.

== Legacy ==
In his 2010 book on archaeological theory Matthew Johnson, then of the University of Southampton, now at Northwestern University, argued that despite the 40 years since its development, the "intellectual questions" first posed by processualism remained "absolutely central" to archaeology.

== Criticism ==
Processual archaeologist David L. Clarke suggested that the New Archaeology would face particular opposition from amateurs, historical archaeologists, and practical excavators but argued that such individuals would still benefit from the theory's adoption.

Processualism began to be critiqued soon after it emerged, initiating a theoretical movement that would come to be called post-processualism. Post-processualist critics consider the main weaknesses of processual archaeology to be:

- environmental determinism
- lack of human agency
- view of cultures as homeostatic, with cultural change only resulting from outside stimuli
- failure to take into account factors such as gender, ethnicity, identity, social relations etc.
- supposed objectivity of interpretation

Writing in 1987, the archaeologist Christopher Chippindale of Cambridge University spoke on the view of processualism at that time, putting it in the context of the 1960s, when he stated that:

The sharper students of the current generation reasonably regard the "New Archaeology" in its pristine form as a period piece, as strange an artefact of that remote era as the Paris évènements or Woodstock. They have some cause: the then-radical insistence that nothing valuable had been written in archaeology before 1960 matched the hippie belief that anyone over 30 was too ancient to be intelligent, and the optimism that anything could be recovered from the archaeological record if only you searched hard enough was the archaeological version of the hope that the Pentagon could be levitated if only enough people had sufficient faith.

== Notes ==
=== Bibliography ===
- Willey, Gordon; Phillips, Philip (1958). Method and Theory in American Archaeology. Chicago: University of Chicago Press.
- Johnson, Matthew (2010). Archaeological Theory: An Introduction (second edition). Oxford: Blackwell. ISBN 978-1405100144.
- Clarke, David (1973). "Archaeology: the loss of innocence". Antiquity. Vol. 47. pp. 6–18.
- Malone, Caroline; Stoddart, Simon (1998). "Special section: David Clarke's "Archaeology: the loss of innocence" (1973) 25 years after". Antiquity. Vol. 72. pp. 676–677.
