= Haidy Geismar =

British anthropologist

Haidy Geismar FBA
- Known for: Cultural and intellectual property, indigenous knowledge systems, museum anthropology, visual anthropology, anthropology of art, digital anthropology
- Notable work: Treasured Possessions (2013); Museum Object Lessons for the Digital Age (2018); Digital Anthropology (2021)
- Awards: Fellow of the British Academy (2025); Collier Award (Society for Visual Anthropology)
- Scientific career
- Fields: Anthropology
- Workplaces: University College London

Haidy Geismar, FBA (born 1976) is a British anthropologist and Professor of Anthropology at University College London (UCL), where she is Founding Director of the UCL School for the Creative and Cultural Industries (SCCI). Her research focuses on cultural and intellectual property, indigenous knowledge systems, museum anthropology, and material, visual and digital anthropology, with a regional emphasis on the Pacific, particularly Vanuatu and New Zealand.

== Early life and education ==
Geismar was born on 24 July 1976 in London, England. She was educated at South Hampstead High School, an all-girls independent school in north-west London. She studied archaeology and anthropology at Pembroke College, Cambridge, graduating from the University of Cambridge with a first class honours Bachelor of Arts (BA) degree. She then undertook a Master of Arts (MA) degree in the anthropology of art, which she completed in 1999, and a Doctor of Philosophy (PhD) degree in anthropology at University College London. Her doctoral thesis was titled "Markets, museums and material culture: Presentations and prestations in Vanuatu, South West Pacific", and her supervisors were Christopher Tilley and Susanne Küchler.

== Academic career ==
Geismar started her academic career in the United States as assistant professor and faculty fellow in New York University's Program in Museum Studies between 2004 and 2006. She then an assistant professor in anthropology and museum studies from 2006, and was made promoted to associate professor (with tenure)) in 2012.

Geismar returned to University College London as a lecturer in 2012. She has been Professor of Anthropology since 2018 and Director of the School for the Creative and Cultural Industries since 2023.

She has also been affiliated with institutions including the Bard Graduate Center and the Centre for Anthropological Research on Museums and Heritage (CARMAH) at the Humboldt University in Berlin.

Since 2000, she has maintained a research collaboration with the Vanuatu Cultural Centre and National Museum, undertaking ethnographic research on contemporary arts, Indigenous economies, and museum practices in the archipelago.

=== Research and contributions ===
Geismar's work addresses cultural and intellectual property, Indigenous knowledge systems, and museum anthropology, including the impact of digital media and practices in these domains. One strand of her research examines how Indigenous communities—particularly in Vanuatu and New Zealand—engage with and negotiate global frameworks governing cultural property across contexts including the art market and local exchange systems.

A further strand of her research explores relationships between social organization, archival systems, and digital infrastructures.

Geismar has also contributed to research in visual and digital anthropology, including work on visual methods such as drawing and photography and the role of digital technologies in collections and knowledge practices.

Her work on museum collections and indigenous heritage includes long-term involvement with Te Maru o Hinemihi, a cultural association connected to the care and future of the Māori meeting house Hinemihi at Clandon Park. Recent publications have placed Hinemihi within wider debates on restitution and museum practice.

She has collaborated with cultural institutions including the Metropolitan Museum of Art, the Victoria and Albert Museum, and Tate

== Publications ==
Selected works include:

- Geismar, Haidy (2013). Treasured Possessions: Indigenous Interventions into Cultural and Intellectual Property. Duke University Press.
- Geismar, Haidy (2018). Museum Object Lessons for the Digital Age. UCL Press.
- Geismar, Haidy; Knox, Hannah (eds.) (2021). Digital Anthropology. 2nd ed. London: Taylor and Francis.
- Geismar, Haidy; Anderson, Jane (eds.) (2017). The Routledge Cultural Property Reader. London: Taylor and Francis.
- Geismar, Haidy; Otto, Ton; Warner, Cameron (eds.) (2022). Impermanence. London: UCL Press.
- Geismar, Haidy; Herle, Anita (2010). Moving Images. University of Hawai'i Press.

== Curatorial work ==
Geismar is curator of the UCL Ethnography Collections. She has curated, or co-curated exhibitions including:

- Vanuatu Stael, Museum of Archaeology and Anthropology, Cambridge (2003–2006).
- Loaded Out: Making a Museum (2007–2008), with New York's Department of Sanitation.
- Port Vila Mi Lavem Yu, East–West Center, Honolulu.
- Power!, UCL East Culture Lab (2024–2025).

== Professional service ==
Geismar has held editorial roles with journals including the Journal of Material Culture and the International Journal of Cultural Property and is the founding editor of the open-access journal Anthropology and Photography. She chaired the Photography Committee of the Royal Anthropological Institute (2016–2024) and has served as a Trustee of the Royal Anthropological Institute since 2025.

== Awards and honours ==
- Fellow of the British Academy (FBA), 2025
- Collier Award, Society for Visual Anthropology (2010)
