= Medway Megaliths =

Group of long barrows in Kent, England

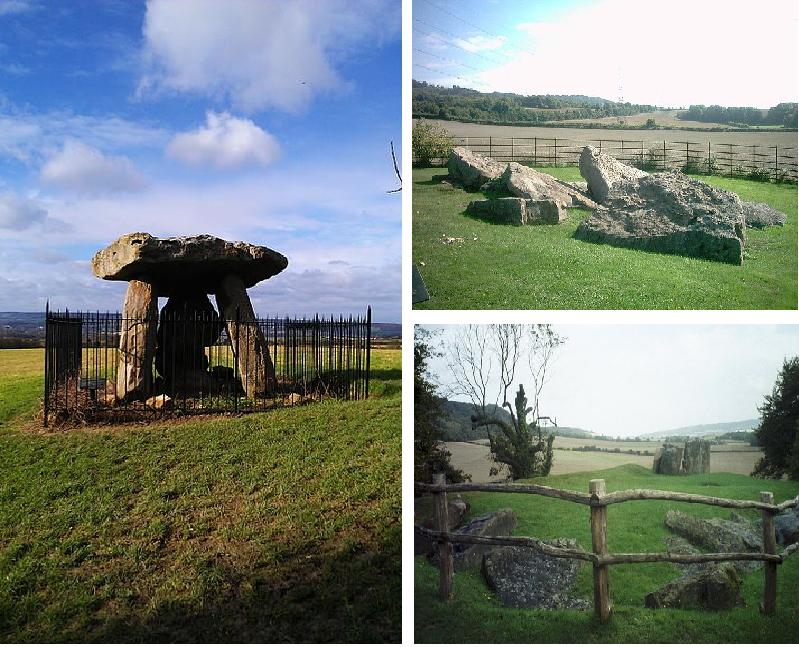
- Three of the Medway Megaliths: Kit's Coty House (left), Little Kit's Coty (above right), and the Coldrum Stones (below right).

- Location within Kent
- Established: Early Neolithic
- Location: Northern Kent
- Coordinates: 51.31746°N 0.502635°E
- Type: Long barrow

The Medway Megaliths, sometimes termed the Kentish Megaliths, are a group of Early Neolithic chambered long barrows and other megalithic monuments located in the lower valley of the River Medway in Kent, South-East England. Constructed from local sarsen stone and soil between the 4th and 3rd millennia BCE, they represent the only known prehistoric megalithic group in eastern England and the most south-easterly group in Britain.

They remain one of several regionally contained chambered long barrow traditions in Britain, although have certain precise architectural characteristics which mark them out as distinct from other groups. The purpose of these long barrows remains elusive, although some were used as tombs for the remains of a select group of individuals. It is also widely believed that they were places where religious rituals were performed. Many archaeologists believe that they reflect the process of Neolithisation of Britain, as hunter-gatherer populations were replaced by pastoralists.

Three chambered tombs have been identified to the west of the river: the Coldrum Stones, Addington Long Barrow, and Chestnuts Long Barrow. To the east of the river, another three chambered tombs have been identified: Kit's Coty House, Little Kit's Coty House, and Smythe's Megalith, although it has also been suggested that two nearby megaliths, the Coffin Stone and the White Horse Stone, are remnants of former chambered tombs. An Early Neolithic longhouse and causewayed enclosure have also been identified in the vicinity of the monuments.

The Medway Megaliths have become heavily damaged and dilapidated since original construction, largely due to an intentional program of destruction in the late 13th century CE. They began to attract the interest of antiquarians in the late 16th century, who developed a number of erroneous theories about their origin, before later being scientifically investigated by archaeologists in the late 19th century. Local folklore has also grown up around the monuments, which came to be interpreted and used as sacred sites by contemporary Pagans in the latter 20th century.

== Background ==
The Early Neolithic was a revolutionary period of British history. Beginning in the fifth millennium BCE, it saw a widespread change in lifestyle as the communities living in the British Isles adopted agriculture as their primary form of subsistence, abandoning the hunter-gatherer lifestyle that had characterised the preceding Mesolithic period. Archaeologists have been unable to prove whether this adoption of farming was because of a new influx of migrants coming in from continental Europe or because the indigenous Mesolithic Britons came to adopt the agricultural practices of continental societies. Either way, it certainly emerged through contact with continental Europe, probably as a result of centuries of interaction between Mesolithic people living in south-east Britain and Linear Pottery culture (LBK) communities in north-eastern France.

Between 4500 and 3800 BCE, all of the British Isles came to abandon its former Mesolithic hunter-gatherer lifestyle, to be replaced by the new agricultural subsistence of the Neolithic Age. Throughout most of Britain, there is little evidence of cereal or permanent dwellings from this period, leading archaeologists to believe that the Early Neolithic economy on the island was largely pastoral, relying on herding cattle, with people living a nomadic or semi-nomadic way of life. It is apparent that although a common material culture was shared throughout most of the British Isles in this period, there was great regional variation regarding the nature and distribution of settlement, architectural styles, and the use of natural resources. There is archaeological evidence of violence and warfare in Early Neolithic Britain from such sites as West Kennet Long Barrow and Hambledon Hill, with some groups constructing fortifications to defend themselves from attackers. Contemporary archaeologists have no direct proof of gender relations on the island at this time, although most believe that it was probably a male-dominated society, in keeping with all recorded societies that practice large-scale animal husbandry.

Britain was largely forested in this period, although did witness some land clearance. It remains unclear to what extent the Kentish area was deforested in the Early Neolithic, although it appears that widespread forest clearance only took place on the chalklands of south-east Britain much later, in the Late Bronze Age. Environmental data from the area around the White Horse Stone supports the idea that the area was still largely forested in the Early Neolithic, covered by a woodland of oak, ash, hazel/alder and Maloideae.

=== The tomb building tradition ===
"It seems that the role of ancestors in Neolithic society was much more important than in the world of the hunter-gatherer. Clans and forebears began to have symbolic importance to the settled farming communities of the Neolithic. Dead ancestors were celebrated through funerals, feasts and grave goods, and their carefully selected body-parts were housed in specially built monuments, often symbolising 'houses' of the dead ... The tombs provide the earliest and most tangible evidence of Neolithic people and their customs, and are some of the most impressive and aesthetically distinctive constructions of prehistoric Britain."

— Archaeologist and prehistorian Caroline Malone, 2001.

Across Western Europe, the Early Neolithic marked the first period in which humans built monumental structures in the landscape. These were tombs that held the physical remains of the dead, and though sometimes constructed out of timber, many were built using large stones, now known as "megaliths". Individuals were rarely buried alone in the Early Neolithic, instead being interred in collective burials with other members of their community. The construction of these collective burial monumental tombs, both wooden and megalithic, began in continental Europe before being adopted in Britain in the first half of the fourth millennium BCE.

The Early Neolithic people of Britain placed far greater emphasis on the ritualised burial of the dead than their Mesolithic forebears had done. Many archaeologists have suggested that this is because Early Neolithic people adhered to an ancestor cult that venerated the spirits of the dead, believing that they could intercede with the forces of nature for the benefit of their living descendants. It has furthermore been suggested that Early Neolithic people entered into the tombs – which doubled as temples or shrines – to perform rituals that would honour the dead and ask for their assistance. For this reason, historian Ronald Hutton termed these monuments "tomb-shrines" to reflect their dual purpose.

In Britain, these tombs were typically located on prominent hills and slopes overlooking the surrounding landscape, perhaps at the junction between different territories. Archaeologist Caroline Malone noted that the tombs would have served as one of a variety of markers in the landscape that conveyed information on "territory, political allegiance, ownership, and ancestors." Many archaeologists have subscribed to the idea that these tomb-shrines served as territorial markers between different tribal groups, although others have argued that such markers would be of little use to a nomadic herding society. Instead it has been suggested that they represent markers along herding pathways. Many archaeologists have suggested that the construction of such monuments reflects an attempt to stamp control and ownership over the land, thus representing a change in mindset brought about by Neolithicisation. Others have suggested that these monuments were built on sites already deemed sacred by Mesolithic hunter-gatherers.

Archaeologists have differentiated these Early Neolithic tombs into a variety of different architectural styles, each typically associated with a different region within the British Isles. Passage graves, characterised by their narrow passage made of large stones and one or multiple burial chambers covered in earth or stone, were predominantly located in northern Britain and southern and central Ireland. Alternately, across northern Ireland and central Britain long chambered mounds predominated, while in the east and south-east of Britain, earthen long barrows represented the dominant architectural trend. These earthen long barrows were typically constructed of timber because building stone was scarce in southern Britain; archaeologist Aubrey Burl argued that these timber tombs might have been "even more eye-catching" than their stone counterparts, perhaps consisting of "towering carved poles, flamboyantly painted", but that evidence of such sculptures has not survived. The Medway Megaliths represent just one of these regional groups within the wider West European tradition of tomb building in this period.

== Description ==
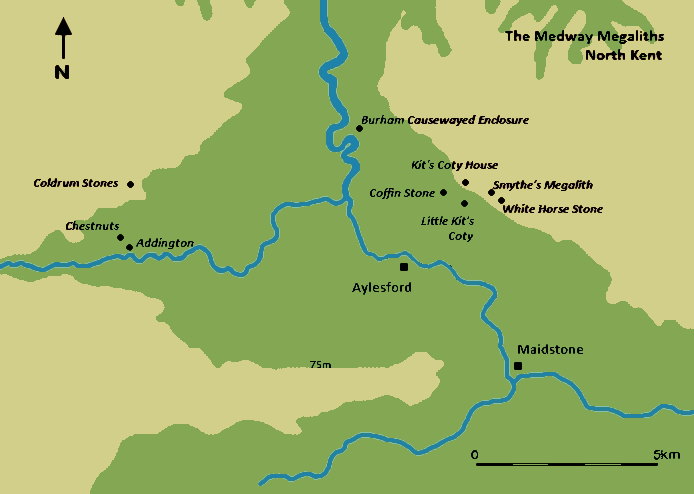
Map of the Medway Megaliths around the River.

Although now all in a ruinous state and not retaining their original appearance, at the time of construction the Medway Megaliths would have been some of the largest and most visually imposing Early Neolithic funerary monuments in Britain. Grouped along the River Medway as it cuts through the North Downs, they constitute the most south-easterly group of megalithic monuments in the British Isles, and the only megalithic group in eastern England. Archaeologists Brian Philp and Mike Dutto deemed the Medway Megaliths to be "some of the most interesting and well known" archaeological sites in Kent, while archaeologist Paul Ashbee described them as "the most grandiose and impressive structures of their kind in southern England". The BBC Countryfile website notes that although none of the monuments are on the same scale as Stonehenge, they are "really quite impressive" when taken collectively, describing them as "the east of England's answer to the megaliths of the Salisbury Plains".

They can be divided into two separate clusters: one to the west of the River Medway and the other on Blue Bell Hill to the east, with the distance between the two clusters measuring at between 8 and 10 km. The western group includes Coldrum Long Barrow, Addington Long Barrow, and the Chestnuts Long Barrow. The eastern group consists of Kit's Coty House, Lower Kit's Coty House, the Coffin Stone, and several other stones which might have once been parts of chambered tombs. It is not known if they were all built at the same time, or whether they were constructed in succession, while similarly it is not known if they each served the same function or whether there was a hierarchy in their usage.

The Medway long barrows all conformed to the same general design plan, and are all aligned on an east to west axis. Each had a stone chamber at the eastern end of the mound, and they each probably had a stone facade flanking the entrance. The chambers were constructed from sarsen, a dense, hard, and durable stone that occurs naturally throughout Kent, having formed out of silicified sand from the Eocene. Early Neolithic builders would have selected blocks from the local area, and then transported them to the site of the monument to be erected.

Such common architectural features among these tomb-shrines indicate a strong regional cohesion with no direct parallels elsewhere in the British Isles. For instance, they would have been taller than most other tomb-shrines in Britain, with internal heights of up to 10 ft. Nevertheless, as with other regional groupings of Early Neolithic tomb-shrines (such as the Cotswold-Severn group), there are also various idiosyncrasies in the different monuments, such as Coldrum's rectilinear shape, the Chestnut long barrow's facade, and the long, thin mounds at Addington and Kit's Coty. This variation might have been caused by the tomb-shrines being altered and adapted over the course of their use; in this scenario, the monuments would represent composite structures.

It seems apparent that the people who built these monuments were influenced by pre-existing tomb-shrines that they were already aware of. Whether those people had grown up locally, or moved into the Medway area from elsewhere is not known. Based on a stylistic analysis of their architectural designs, Stuart Piggott thought that they had originated in the area around the Low Countries, while Glyn Daniel instead believed that the same evidence showed an influence from Scandinavia. John H. Evans instead suggested an origin in Germany, and Ronald F. Jessup thought that their origins could be seen in the Cotswold-Severn megalithic group. Paul Ashbee noted that their close clustering in the same area was reminiscent of the megalithic tomb-shrine traditions of continental Northern Europe, and emphasised that the Medway Megaliths were a regional manifestation of a tradition widespread across Early Neolithic Europe. He nevertheless stressed that a precise place of origin was "impossible to indicate" with the available evidence.

There is little evidence for deposition within the tomb-shrines, largely due to the damage that they have sustained. Human bone has been found in the Coldrum Long Barrow, Addington Long Barrow, and the Coffin Stone, burned bone from Chestnuts Long Barrow, and pot sherds from Chestnuts, Addington, and Kit's Coty. They have thus usually been interpreted as collective tombs for the interment of the physical remains of the dead. Ashbee believed that the area surrounding the megaliths might have been a "ritual landscape" that was believed to possess "especial qualities", thus explaining why Early Neolithic people decided to construct the monuments at this location. Killick suggested that the area was chosen because of the visually imposing nature of the local landscape, also suggesting that it might have been chosen because it allowed for intervisibility between the different monuments. Inspired by ideas pioneered elsewhere by the archaeologist Chris Tilley, Killick suggested that the Medway Megaliths were oriented to point at either the Downs or the river, noting that five of the monuments point toward at least one of these two geographical features. The views visible from the monuments are not however uniform; had the vicinity been deforested, then Kit's Coty, Little Kit's Coty and Coldrum would have had 360° panoramic views of the landscape, whereas only a third of the local landscape is visible from Addington and Chestnuts Long Barrows. Killick also thought it probably that intervisibility was a factor in locating the monuments, noting that Kit's Coty House, Little Kit's Coty and the Coffin Stone were probably intervisible in the Early Neolithic, as were Addington and Chestnuts Long Barrow, and the White Horse Stones and Smythe's Megalith.

=== Related activity ===
Other evidence of Neolithic activity has also been identified in the vicinity of the megaliths. Excavation by the Oxford Archaeological Unit in the late 1990s revealed the existence of a Neolithic longhouse close to the White Horse Stone. It was stylistically very similar to longhouses belonging to the linearbandkeramic (LBK) and post-LBK cultures of central and north-western Europe, which are dated to the 5th and 6th millennia BCE. Three of the building's post holes contained sherds of Early Neolithic ceramic Plain Bowls, which were radiocarbon dated to 4110–3530 cal BCE. In the vicinity, sherds of Clacton-style Grooved Ware and Mortlake-style Peterborough ware ceramics were also found, dating from the Mid-to-Late Neolithic, suggesting that activity continued at the site over a long period of time (c.3750–2250 BCE). It is not known what the purpose of the longhouse was, or whether it was primarily domestic or ritualistic in function, although excavators expressed their opinion that it was probably domestic and communal in use. Conversely, the archaeologist Paul Ashbee thought it likely that it was a "cult-house" on the basis of its isolated nature. Evidence of a smaller, circular building was found to the south-east of the longhouse, although this might have been later in date. Ashbee highlighted that the stone long barrows stylistically emulated the wooden long houses, and that this was probably an act of conscious imitation.

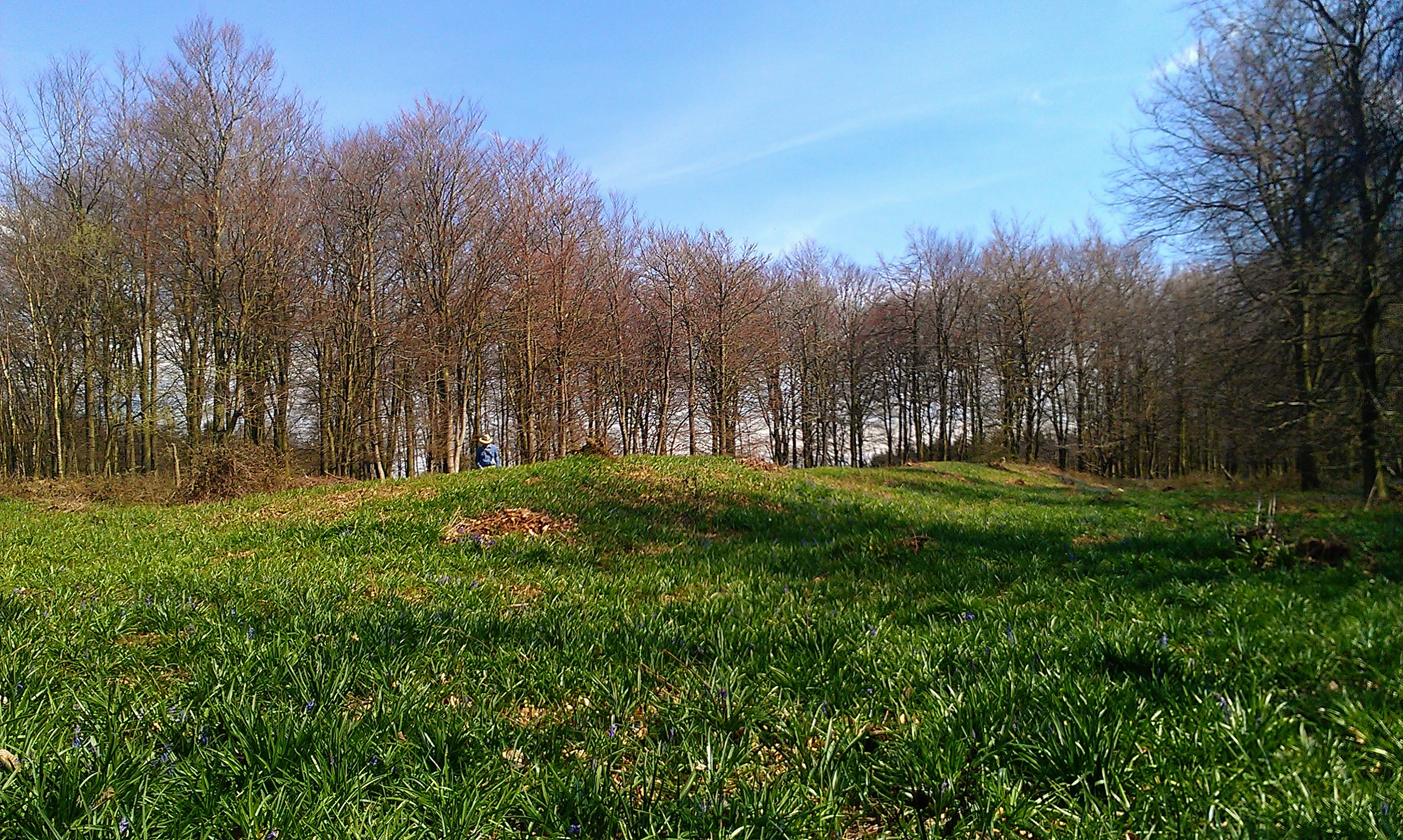
The Stour long barrows, such as Julliberrie's Grave (pictured left) and Jacket's Field Long Barrow (right) are non-megalithic funerary monuments near the Medway megaliths

An Early Neolithic causewayed enclosure was also found in the vicinity of the megaliths, at Burham. The enclosure consists of two closely spaced concentric ditches, surrounding an oval-shaped area measuring 5 ha. It is thus the largest known causewayed enclosure in Kent and one of the largest known in Britain. Excavation in 2009–10 unearthed dating evidence showing that the enclosure was in use from circa 3700 to 3400 BCE.

The Medway Megaliths are not the only Early Neolithic mound monuments in modern Kent, with another group of long barrows being located around the Stour valley. Here, three monuments are still evident: Julliberrie's Grave, Boughton Aluph barrow, and Elmstead barrow. These Stour monuments primarily differ from their Medway counterparts in that they have not been built using sarsens, and are thus non-megalithic, unchambered long barrows. The decision by the builders of these Stour Long-Barrows to avoid using stone as a building material was likely deliberate, for sarsens are naturally present in the local area and could have been obtained without too much trouble.

== Later history ==
Throughout later prehistory, the landscape around the Medway megaliths continued to be used for ritual and ceremonial purposes, including rich Bronze Age burials, gold deposits in the Late Bronze Age, an Iron Age cemetery with several rich bucket burials and a potential Romano-British temple on Blue Bell Hill. Evidence for a settlement dating to the Late Bronze Age and Early Iron Age has been identified on the western side of the valley by the White Horse Stone, as evidenced by postholes indicating possible roundhouses and numerous four-post structures, alongside pits that might originally have been used for storage. In the Medieval period, the Pilgrim's Way track was constructed close to the megaliths.

In the latter 13th century, the Medway Megaliths were systematically damaged, although this was accomplished in different ways. Some of the chambers were completely toppled, while others were left standing. The reasons for this destruction are not entirely clear. Ashbee suggested that it was due to the Christian Church's renewed attempt to consolidate its control over non-Christian beliefs and practices, in conjunction with the Northern Crusade that was supported by both Edward I and Edward III of England. He also suggested that the construction of St. Stephen's Church at Tottington, St. Michael's Church at Cosington, and St. Margaret's Church at Addington, all in the vicinity of the megaliths, was potentially part of this same process.

=== Antiquarian and archaeological investigation ===
"The many perspectives of the Medway's stone-built long barrows, from the sixteenth-century to the present day, are conditioned by the nature of the inevitable progress of knowledge. Such successive restatements cannot be other than in terms of the interests and assumptions of their age and, when representations are involved, the subjectivity of vision which is contingent upon understanding."

— Archaeologist Paul Ashbee, 1993.

From the late 16th century, the Medway Megaliths began to be discussed in the published literature of antiquarians. A number of the megaliths were damaged or destroyed during the 19th century, perhaps to be broken up and used as building material by local masons.

Antiquarian investigations came to be replaced by archaeological ones in the 19th century. In 1871 E.H.W. Dunkin published a paper titled "On the Megalithic Remains in Mid-Kent" in which he discussed the monuments and included his own plans of their lay-outs. In 1908, George Klint included information on the megaliths in his Kentish volume of the Victoria County History, in which he included early photographs of the structures and identified them as being Neolithic in origin. In 1924, O.G.S. Crawford provided locations and further information on the sites in his Ordnance Survey Professional Paper, in which he also discussed their origins.

In 1982, Robin Holgate published a paper in Archaeologia Cantiana in which he reassessed the stones in the context of contemporary thought as to megalithic archaeology in Britain. He noted that sample excavation at each site would be necessary in order to develop a "chronological and structural framework" for the tradition. From October 1998 to March 1999, the company Oxford Archaeological Unit excavated the site around the White Horse Stone at the behest of Union Railways (South) (URS) in advance of the construction of the nearby Channel Tunnel Rail Link. The excavations were directed by Richard Brown. Archaeologist Paul Garwood of the University of Birmingham oversaw a six-year fieldwork program known as the Medway Valley Prehistoric Landscapes Project from 2006 to 2012 in which he mapped the landscape surrounding the megaliths. During 2007–08, archaeologist Sian Killick performed a phenomenological survey of the tombs in their surrounding landscape, looking at factors of intervisibility.

=== Religious and folk practices ===
Several modern Pagan religions are practiced at the Medway Megaliths, the most publicly visible of which is Druidry. As of 2014, a Druidic group known as Roharn's Grove were recorded as performing their ceremonies at the monuments, as were Heathen groups like the neo-völkisch Odinic Rite and Woden's Folk.

Analysing Pagan uses of the Megaliths, the scholar of religion Ethan Doyle White argued that these Pagans commonly associated the sites both with a concept of ancestry and of them being a source of "earth energy". He argued that these sites in particular were interpreted as having connections to the ancestors both because they were created by Neolithic peoples whom modern Pagans view as their "own spiritual ancestors" and because the sites were once chambered tombs, and thus held the remains of the dead, who themselves may have been perceived as ancestors. On this latter point, it is apparent that Pagan perspectives on these sites are themselves shaped by older archaeological interpretations. Doyle White also observed differences in how this concept of ancestry was understood: among the Heathens, this concept of ancestry was expressly genetic and racial, with the figures being "ancestors of the blood". Conversely, the Druids emphasised "ancestors of the land", with whom they share a spiritual connection rather than a necessarily racial one. The Pagans also cited the Megaliths as spots marking sources of "earth energy", often aligned on ley lines, an idea likely derived ultimately from the publications of Earth Mysteries proponents like John Michell.

== The western stones ==
=== Coldrum Long Barrow ===
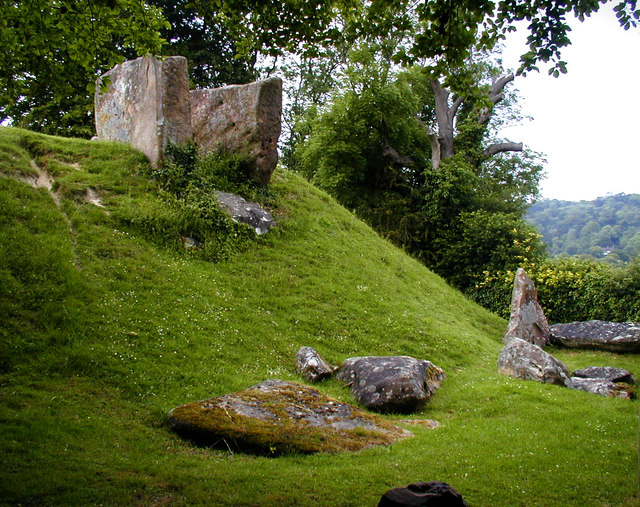
Coldrum Long Barrow

Coldrum Long Barrow, also known as the Coldrum Stones and the Coldrum, sits north-east of the village of Trottiscliffe and about 500 metres from the Pilgrims Way track. The tomb is situated on a small ridge facing east, towards the Medway. About 20 metres in length, the width at the western end is about 15 metres, and 19 metres at the eastern end, thus forming a truncated wedge-shape.

It is the best preserved of the Medway Megaliths. Nevertheless, it has suffered much damage, particularly to its eastern side, where the sarsen boulders have broken away from the monument and fallen down the ridge.

The name "Coldrum" dates from at least the mid-19th century, and comes from an adjacent farmhouse, Coldrum Lodge, which has since been demolished. From 1842 to 1844, the antiquarian Beale Post authored an unpublished account of the monument in which he stated that skulls had been found in the terrace, close to the chamber, in 1804 and 1825. The earliest known reference in print to the Coldrum Stones comes from Albert Way 1845, when it was erroneously described as a stone circle with a cromlech. In 1856, John Mitchell Kemble and the Reverend Lambert Larkin excavated at the site, reporting to the Central Committee of the British Archaeological Association that they had discovered sherds of pottery, some of which they suspected to be Anglo-Saxon in date.

The first published plan of the monument came from E.H.W. Dunkin in 1871, although a more detailed plan was published by Flinders Petrie in 1878, and the first photograph of the site was published in 1893. In 1910, F.J. Bennett undertook an excavation at the site, revealing the bones of 22 individuals, of both sexes and various ages, along with a pot sherd and a flint saw, which had been buried in the north-western part of the monument. Further bones were excavated in a 1922 excavation by E.W. Filkins, but these were largely lost during the Second World War. In 1926, the monument was given to the National Trust who dedicated it as a memorial to the local historian Benjamin Harrison. In 1946, the folklorist John H. Evans noted that locally, the Coldrum Long Barrows had come to be associated with the folkloric trope of the countless stones. The site is open free of charge to the public throughout the year, and can be accessed by foot along Coldrum Lane.

=== Addington Long Barrow ===
Addington long barrow is situated about 250 metres north of the parish church in Addington, and can be accessed via one of two small roads that branch off from the A2. A peristalith, the monument is approximately 60 metres in length, although its width tapers, from 14 metres at the east to 11 metres at the west. The stone chamber was apparently on the eastern end, although has now collapsed. The monument is now bisected by a road running through the middle of it. The mound of the barrow is currently one metre high, although would initially have been much higher, having succumbed to millennia of weathering.

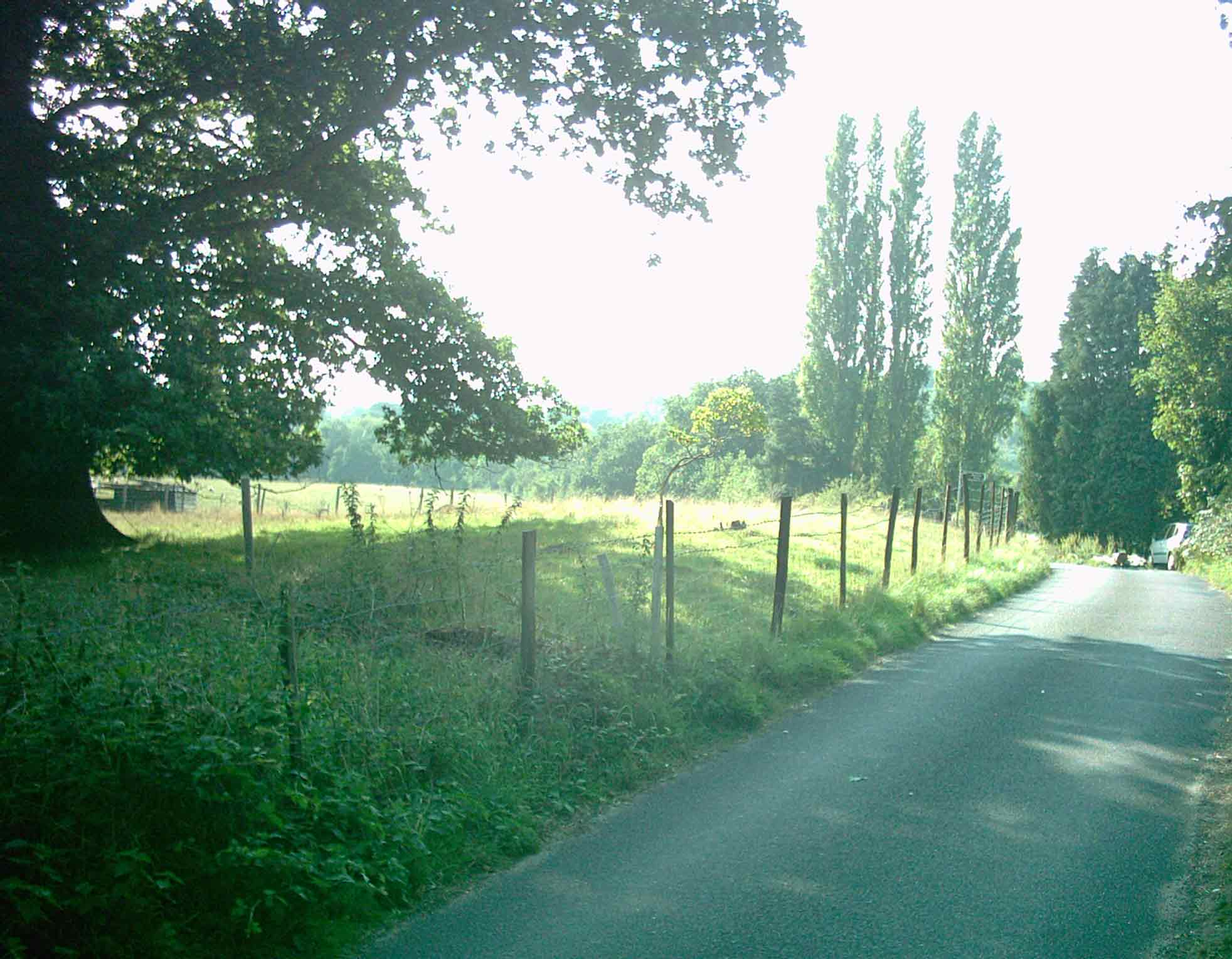
The barrow at Addington, bisected by a small road.

The first published record that commented on the existence of stones at the site was in 1719, although they would only be described as the relics of a prehistoric survival in print in 1779, when it was erroneously described as a stone circle and compared to Stonehenge. When the road was widened and deepened in 1827, two of the stones from the revetment curb were removed and deposited in the corner of the wood to the south of the barrow. The site was excavated circa 1845 by a local vicar, the Reverend Lambert Larking, who allegedly found some evidence of ceramics; it has also been asserted, although not proven, that he discovered human bones at the site. When Thomas Wright explored it c.1850, he was aided by a local man who enthusiastically believed that a crock of gold would be buried there, something that Leslie Grinsell deemed to be part of local folklore.

Edwin Dunkin produced a plan of the site in 1871, with a more accurate plan being created by Augustus Pitt-Rivers in 1878. The monument underwent a measured survey in 1981 by a team from the Kent Archaeological Rescue Unit (KARU). KARU continued to monitor the status of the monument, and in 2007 archaeologist Brian Philp noted that rabbit burrowing had compromised the road; as the road was being repaired, a previously unknown sarsen was discovered buried on the northern side of the monument. The rabbit burrowing prompted rescue excavations in 2007 and 2010 led by Paul Garwood of the University of Birmingham. This revealed buried sarsens on the north side of the monument, but no dating evidence. The site is situated on privately owned land, although is visible from the road.

=== Chestnuts Long Barrow ===
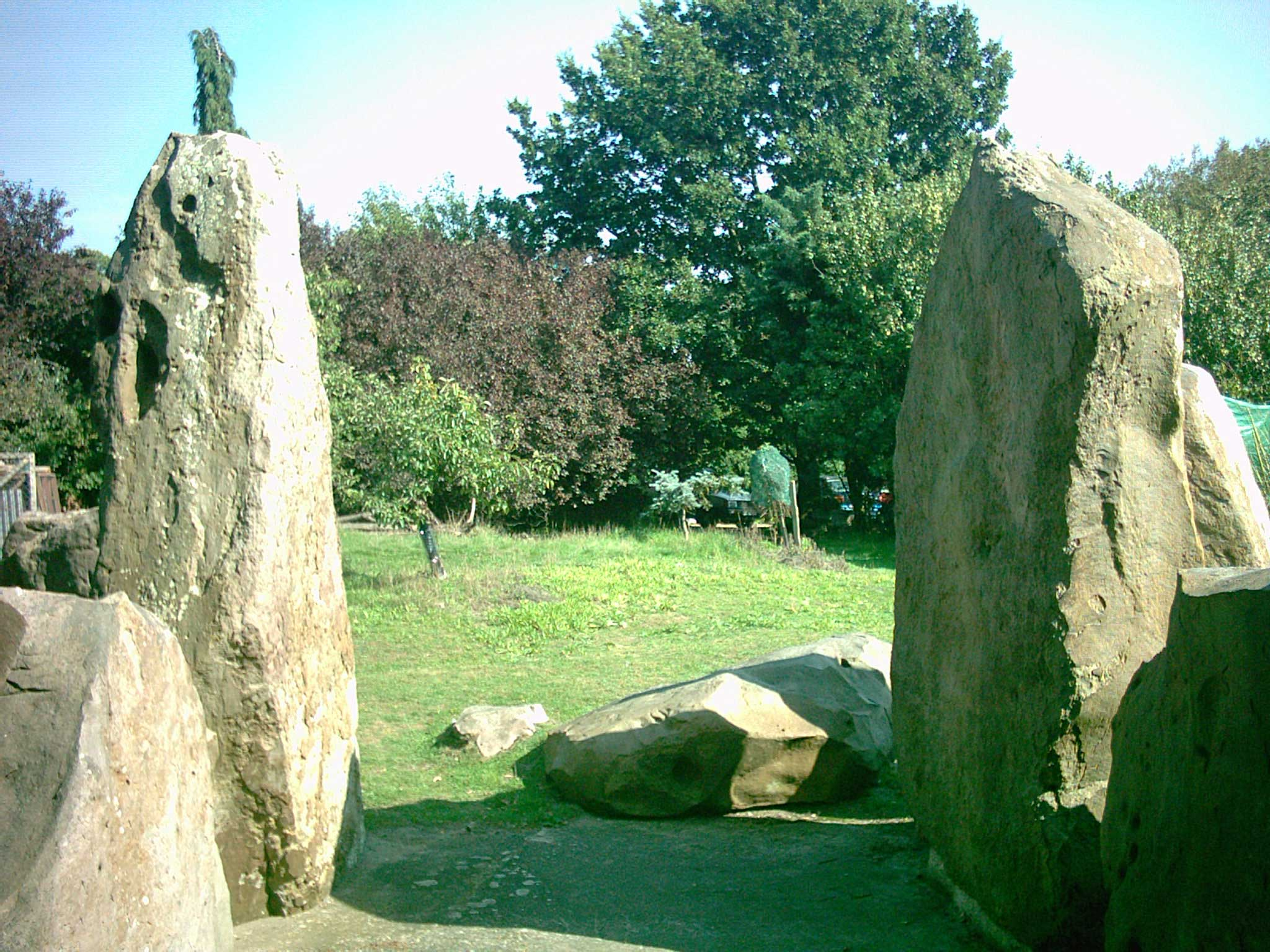
Chesnuts Long Barrow

Chestnuts Long Barrow is located around 100 metres north-west of Addington long barrow. The mound itself no longer exists, although the eastern end of the barrow is still marked out by sarsens, some of which have been re-erected to their original positions. Although the earthen mound no longer exists in any form, it has been estimated that it would have been 20 metres long and around 15 metres wide. The chamber would have been 12 ft long, 7 ft wide, and 9 ft high, thus being described by Paul Ashbee as being of "huge and unusual proportions". Inside the chamber had been deposited human bone, cremated bone, flint artefacts, and ceramic sherds.

The first unequivocal published mention of the Chesnuts Long Barrow was provided by antiquarian Josiah Colebrooke in 1773; he erroneously considered it to be a stone circle, describing it as one of "the temples of the antient [sic] Britons". In 1778 John Thorpe wrongly associated the monument with the ancient druids, and it was not until 1863 that Charles Moore Jessop recognised that the stones had once been part of a chambered tomb. The site was excavated in 1957 by John Alexander at the behest of the Ancient Monuments Inspectorate of the Ministry of Works due to the construction of a house nearby. Human bone and other artefacts discovered were deposited in Maidstone Museum. Much of this material was destroyed during the 1980s by a fire in the museum, preventing the human remains from being radiocarbon dated. In 1981, a team from the Kent Archaeological Rescue Unit performed a measurement survey of the monument.

The barrow is located on private land, and is accessible for a small fee.

== The eastern stones ==
=== Kit's Coty House ===
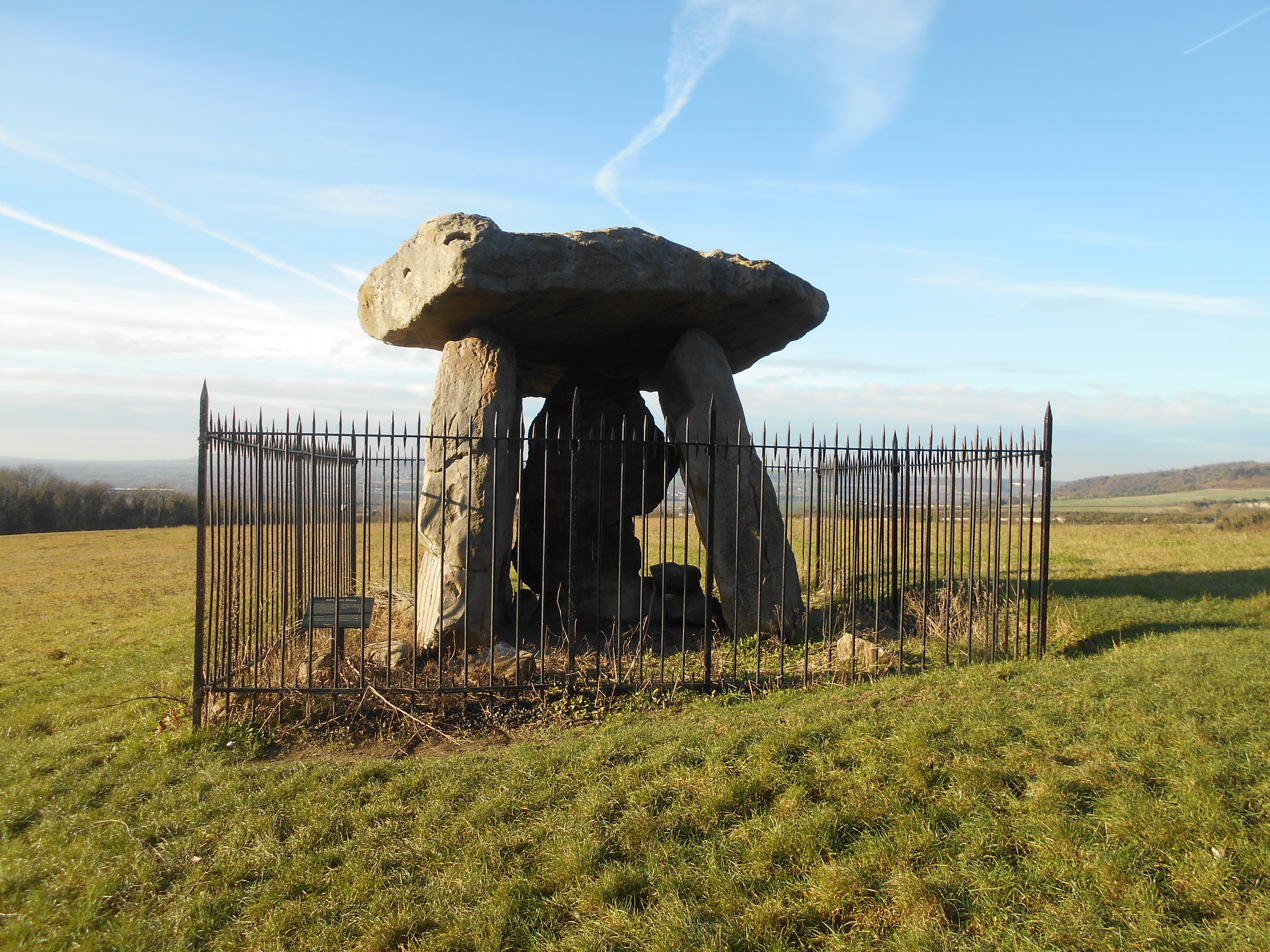
Kit's Coty House

Kit's Coty House represents the surviving remains of another chambered tomb, and has been described by archaeologist Timothy Champion as "perhaps the best-known monument in Kent". The long mound has eroded away, leaving only a dolmen on the eastern end of the monument, which consists of three large upright stones, with a fourth capstone on top. Traces of the mound and peristalith were identified in January 1982 during a measured survey by the Kent Archaeological Rescue Unit, in which they showed it to be 70m long, estimating that it was about 1m high.

Archaeologist Paul Garwood noted that the chamber's closest parallels come from western Britain. Garwood's team investigated the site from 2009 to 2012, using excavations and geophysical surveys. They revealed that the chamber was not directly connected to the long mound, being offset to the south, and thus was potentially part of a structure that predated the long mound. They also revealed that the long mound had gone through at least two main phases of construction.

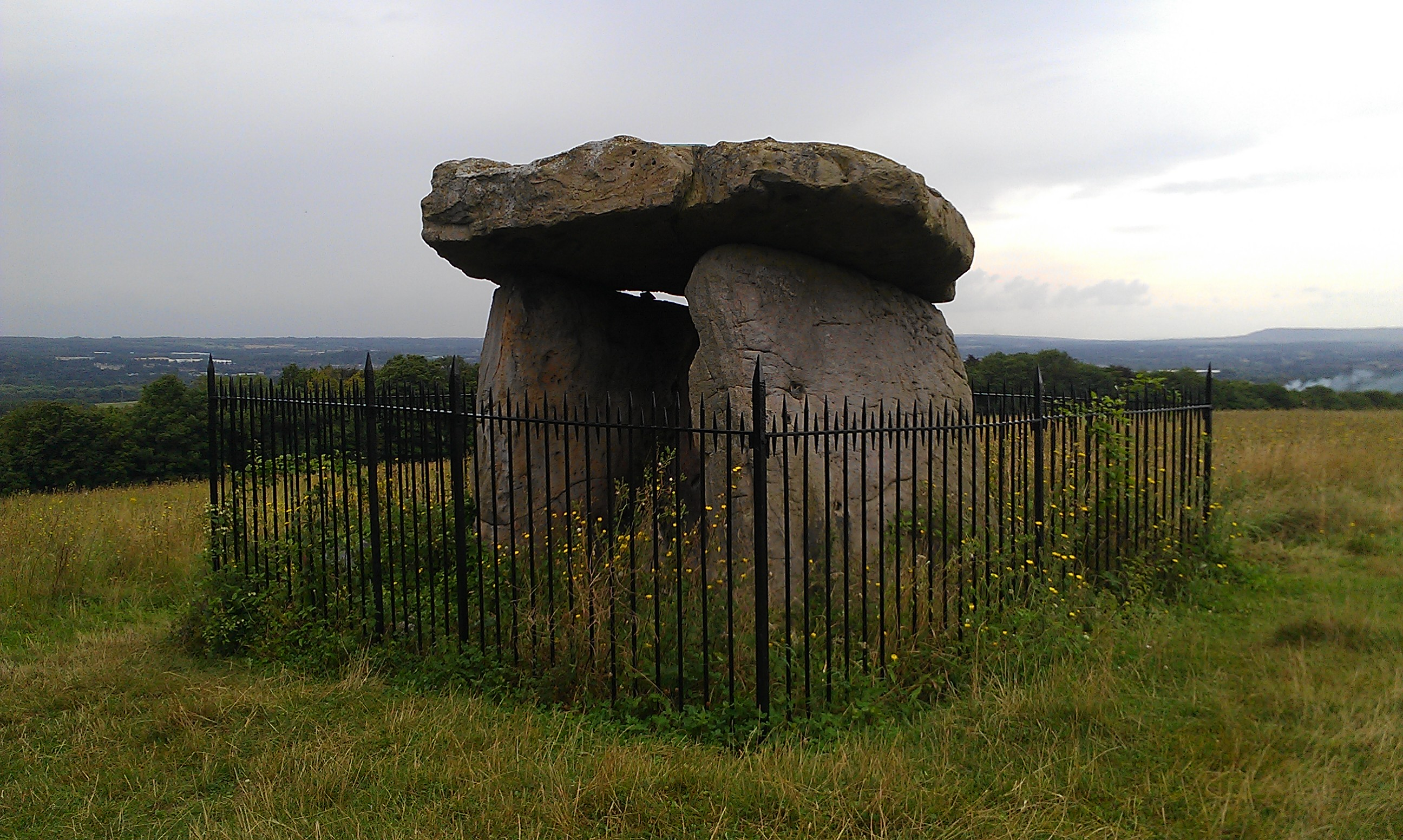
Kit's Coty House

Due to its accessibility, Kit's Coty House has attracted continual notice since the 16th century. In the latter part of that century, the stones were discussed in print by three antiquarians: William Lambarde, William Camden, and John Stow. Although not featured in the first edition, Lambarde discussed Kit's Coty in the second edition of his Perambulation of Kent, published in 1596. Here he compares it to Stonehenge in Wiltshire, describing it as having been erected by ancient Britons to the memory of Catigern, a figure whom he presumably knew about through the work of Nennius. He also noted that the site was associated with the mythical hero Horsa, whom he believed had been buried nearby. However, it was the discussion of the work in Camden's Britannia that resulted in it becoming more widely known and developing into a visitor's attraction; for instance, Samuel Pepys recorded his 1669 visit to the site in his diary.

It attracted the interest of antiquarian John Aubrey, who wrote about it in his Monumenta Britannica, in which he included an image of the site drawn by classical scholar Thomas Gale. William Stukeley first visited the site in October 1722, making various drawings and plans of the monument, and would later publish his findings, albeit without reference to either Horsa or Catigern. In 1722, Hercules Ayleway recorded a local belief that the monument had been erected in memorial to two contending kings of Kent, who died in a battle nearby.

Following the introduction of the Ancient Monuments Protection Act 1882, the first Inspector of Ancient Monuments, Augustus Pitt Rivers, visited Kit's Coty in April 1886, noting that it was being damaged by ploughing and graffiti. He ensured that it was categorised as a protected monument in 1885, and that an iron railing be put around the chamber, although not the mound, which would be subject to further damage through ploughing. In 1946, folklorist John H. Evans recorded another local piece of folklore that the megalithic dolmen was constructed by three witches living on Blue Bell Hill, while the capstone was then raised atop with the aid of a fourth witch. The monument is currently surrounded by iron railings, and is regularly visited by tourists.

=== Little Kit's Coty House ===
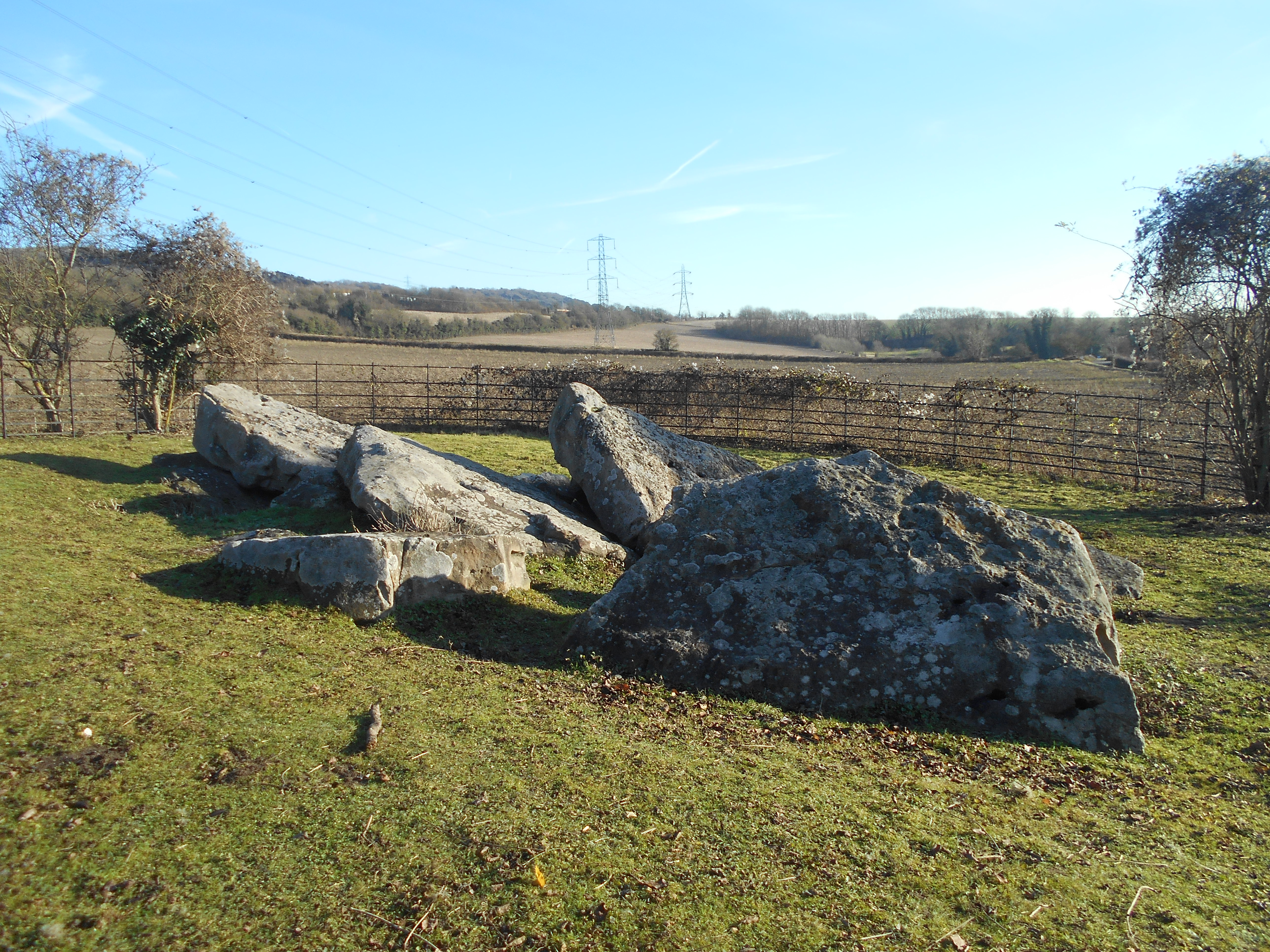
Little Kit's Coty House

Little Kit's Coty House, also known as Lower Kit's Coty House and the Countless Stones, is located about 3 km north east of the village of Aylesford. It is permanently open to visitors, although the monument is enclosed within iron railings. In its current state, it consists of about 21 stones of various sizes.

The antiquarian John Aubrey noted the existence of Little Kit's Coty in his unpublished Monumenta Britannica, having been informed of its existence by classical scholar Thomas Gale. It was also investigated and detailed by fellow antiquarian William Stukeley, who noted that it was once a chambered tomb in his posthumously published Itinerarium Curiosum of 1776. Stukeley had been informed that many of the stones in the monument had been pulled down in the late 17th century. By the early 19th century, the site was being erroneously associated with the ancient druids, and by the middle of the century was associated with the folkloric tale of the countless stones, thus gaining the actual moniker of "the Countless Stones". In 1887, it became a scheduled ancient monument.

Folklorist Leslie Grinsell believed that it only adopted the name "Countless Stones" following the monument's pillaging circa 1690. The folktale held that an Aylesford baker attempted to count the stones by placing a loaf on each of the stones, but one loaf disappeared, with the Devil appearing in its place. At the end, the baker tried to count the loaves, but found that he had one more than he had brought with him. As he was about to call out the number of the stones, he then fell dead. In 1976, Grinsell noted that this folkloric belief still survived, as evidenced by numbers chalked on to the stones.

=== Coffin Stone ===
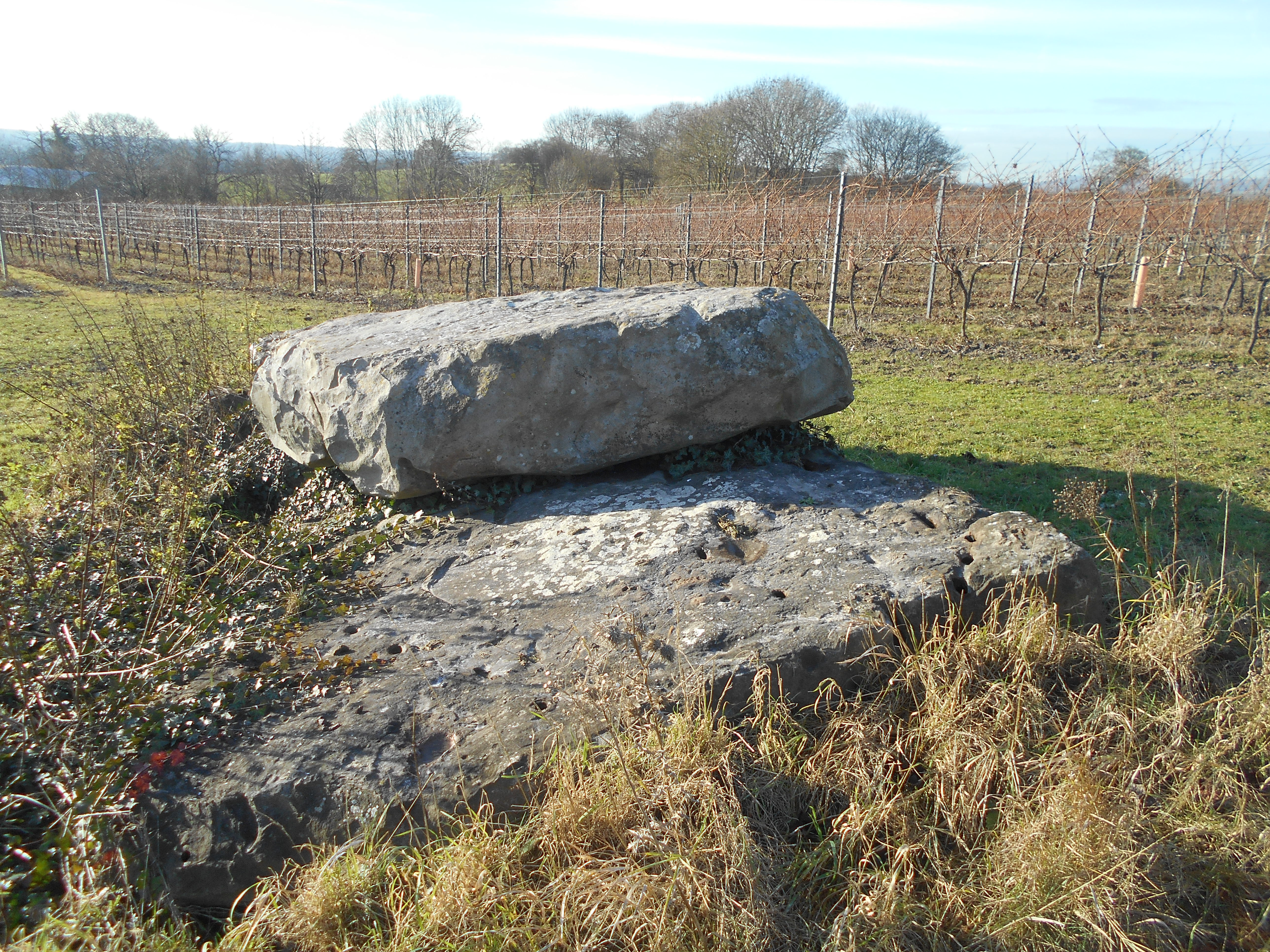
The Coffin Stone, in a vineyard

The Coffin Stone is located about 400 metres north-west of Little Kits Coty House, and is also around 250 metres away from the Pilgrims Way.

The Coffin Stone is a rectangular sarsen measuring about 4.40m by 2.80m, and is at least 50 cm thick. Archaeologists Brian Philp and Mike Dutto thought that this stone marked the chamber of a chambered long-barrow, noting that an outline of a mound could be seen. They highlighted that two smaller stones exist nearby, and that another sarsen was also located close by; in 1980, a farmer shifted that latter stone atop the Coffin Stone, where it still resides.

The monument's existence was noted in Stukeley's 1776 Itinerarium Curiosum. In the 1840s, an antiquary and Druid from Maidstone, Beal Poste, published an account in which he asserted that a sack full of human bones was found in the vicinity of the Stone during the 1830s. A slightly different account was provided by Edwin Dunkin in 1871; he asserted that a hedge had been removed in 1836, revealing the stone along with two human skulls, several bones, and charcoal, although he did not state the provenance of this account.

In 2008 and 2009, a team led by Garwood's team excavated at the site, revealing that the sarsen had only been placed in its current position during the Post-Medieval period (c.1450–1600), and thus was not the fallen orthostat of a chambered tomb as had previously been believed. Garwood nevertheless suggested that it might have been erected as a monolith during later prehistory, as evidence citing a large hollow in the chalk adjacent to the stone, which he asserted had similarities with the extraction hollows of the Cuckoo Stone and Torstone discovered during the Stonehenge Riverside Project.

=== Smythe's Megalith ===
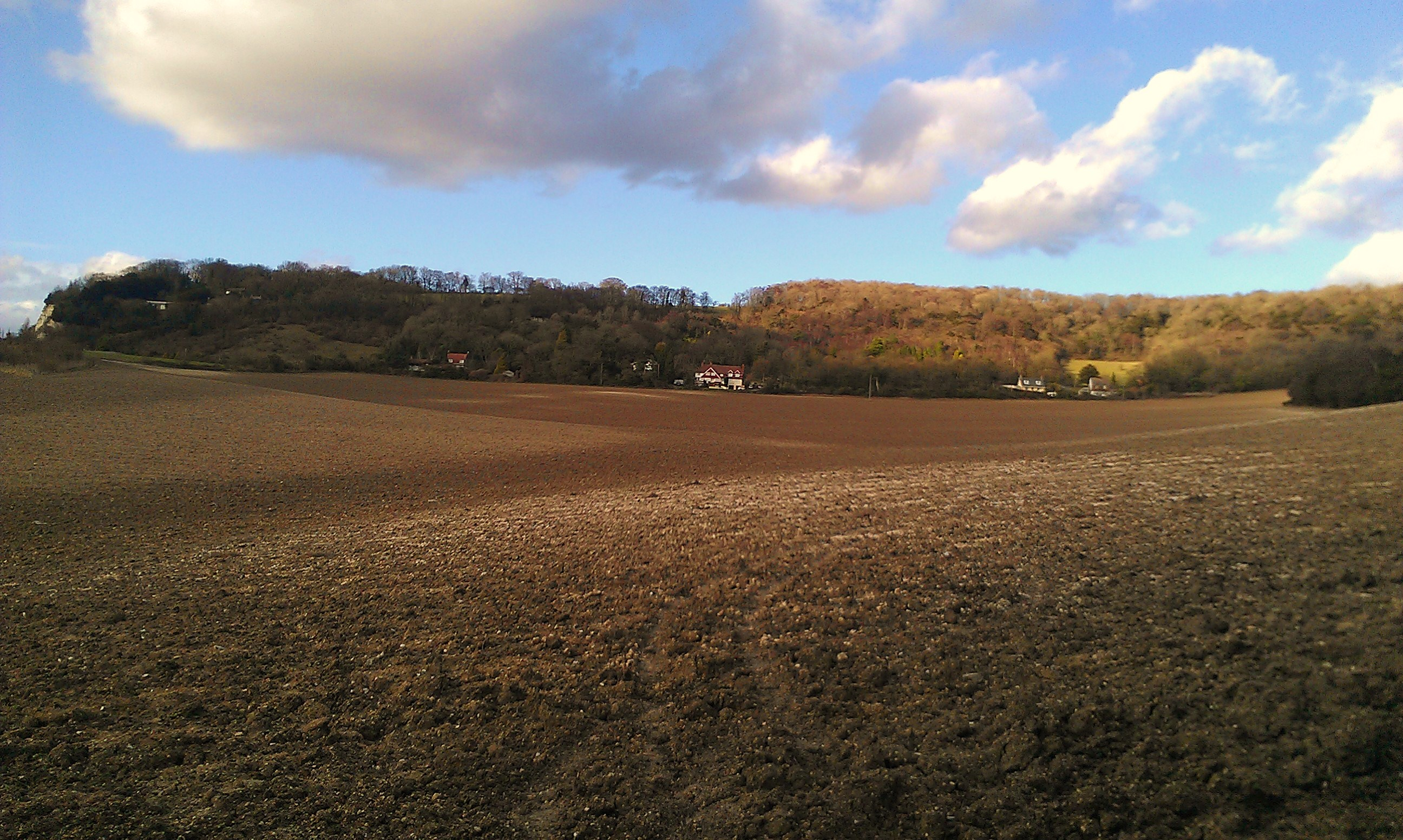
The field in which Smythe's Megalith was located

Another chambered tomb once existed in a large field east of the A229, which is sometimes termed Smythe's Megalith. In 1823 or 1824, the landowner, George Fowle, found that large sarsens beneath the soil were interfering with ploughing. When he tried removing them, he discovered three upright sarsens, and brought Maidstone historian Clement Taylor Smythe to investigate the site. Smythe's excavation revealed a rectilinear stone chamber, containing the bones of at least two adults and a pot sherd. None of the monument remains visible. From the account, Ashbee noted that the chamber was clearly oriented on an east–west axis like the rest of the Medway Megaliths and that the chamber would have been at the eastern end of a long barrow.

=== The White Horse Stones ===
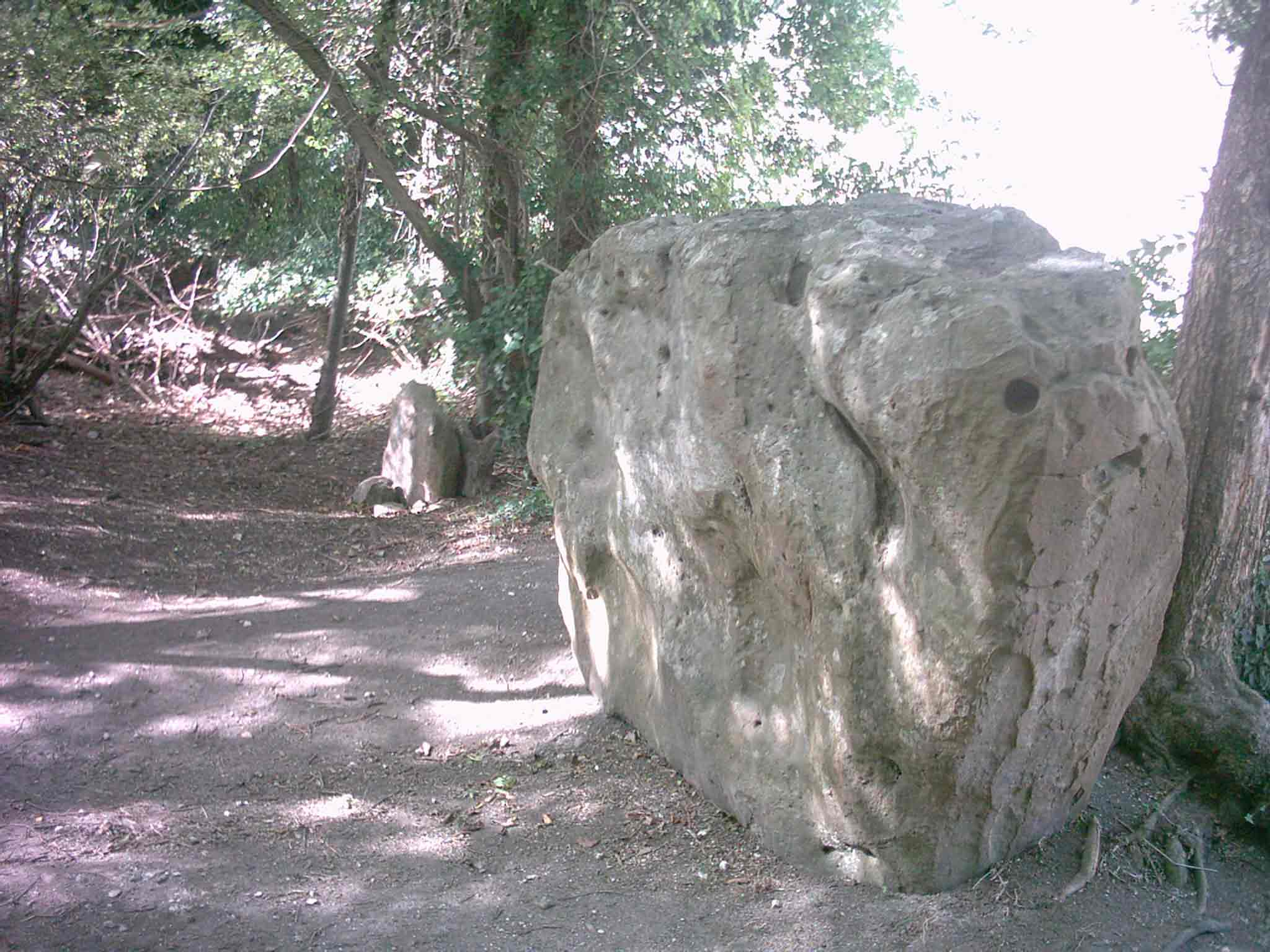
Upper White Horse Stone with some of the smaller stones behind it.

The Upper White Horse Stone is located inside a narrow strip of woodland east of the A229 dual carriageway, and can be reached via the Pilgrim's Way track. Erected in an upright position, the stone measures 2.90m in length, 1.65m in height, and 60 cm in width. There are nine smaller stones extending westward from the Upper White Horse Stone for about 10 metres. These might represent parts of a chambered tomb, although there is no evidence of a mound, and it is possible that they are actually stones moved from an adjacent field by farmers. About 300m west of the Upper White Horse Stone was a second large upright stone, known as Lower White Horse Stone, but this was destroyed in the 1820s, and its site is probably now under the dual-carriageway.

S.C. Lampreys recorded a piece of local folklore in the early 19th century which held that in the Battle of Aylesford of 455, Hengist and Horsa flew the banner of the White Horse, before it was found next to or under the White Horse Stone. Ashbee noted that this folk tale was probably no older than the 17th century, because it made use of the motif of the White Horse of Kent which developed at that point. Ashbee believed that much of the folklore associated with the White Horse Stone was originally associated with the Lower White Horse Stone, only transferring to the Upper counterpart upon the former's destruction.

=== Other possible tombs ===
In 1980, a farmer discovered two large buried stones near the eastern group of chambered long barrows. Excavation by the Kent Archaeological Rescue Unit revealed four further medium-sized stones buried in pits dug into the underlying chalk. The excavators believed that this represented a potential chambered long barrow.
