= Phenomenology (archaeology) =

Application of sensory experiences to interpret an archaeological site

In archaeology, phenomenology is the application of sensory experiences to view and interpret an archaeological site or cultural landscape in the past. It views space as socially produced and is concerned with the ways people experience and understand spaces, places, and landscapes. Phenomenology became a part of the Post-processual archaeology movement in the early 1990s and was a reaction to Processual archaeology's proposed 'scientific' treatment of space as an abstract and empty locus for action. In contrast, phenomenology proposes a 'humanized' space which is embedded with meaning and is created through praxis (actions, rituals, social events, and relationships between people and places). Phenomenology therefore treats the landscape as a network of places, each of which bears meaning and is connected through movements and narratives.

Phenomenological approaches have been the subject of much debate within archaeology, with critics saying the methods are unscientific, subjective, and require an assumption that modern human experiences of a landscape approximate the experiences those of people in the past. Others, however, have found the framework useful in analyses using Geographical Information Systems and Virtual Reality Modeling, despite early phenomenologists in archaeology rejecting these representations in favor of embodied experiences.

== Overview ==
Phenomenological approaches in archaeology first came to widespread attention among archaeologists with the publication of Christopher Tilley's A Phenomenology of Landscape: Places, Paths and Monuments (1994), in which he proposed phenomenology as a technique to discover more about historical peoples and how they interacted with the landscapes in which they lived. Drawing on ethnographic examples from around the world, Tilley proposed that physical connections to the landscape were especially a part of the lives of non-industrial societies and that land "becomes humanized" as specific myths and stories get tied to places in the landscape. Therefore, "Spatial experience is not innocent and neutral, but invested with power relating to age, gender, social position, and relationships with others." Phenomenological techniques seek to understand this humanized space to gain further insight to how peoples living in hunter-gatherer and agricultural societies related to those landscapes.

In Time, Culture and Identity : An Interpretative Archaeology Julian Thomas proposed phenomenology as a way of overcoming a Cartesian view of the world which separates mind and body, and nature and culture. Thomas says that this split is a cultural product of Modernity which structured Culture-historical archaeology and Processual archaeology, but limits the ways these approaches handle material culture. By enforcing the nature/culture divide, Thomas says culture-historical approaches tend to treat the material as mostly unimportant, focusing on the mental and cultural aspects material culture, while processual archaeology treats culture as not in mind or body, but rather the interaction between people and their environments. As such, Thomas says neither approach allowed archaeologists to study culture directly. Thomas says phenomenology, in contrast, understands material culture in its relationship to a "Being-in-the-world" and therefore culture is not embedded in any one entity but rather the relationships between entities across time. This interpretation of phenomenological approaches prefigures Ian Hodder's theorization of Human-thing-entanglement.

== Methodology ==
In The Materiality of Stone: Explorations in Landscape Archaeology (2004), Christopher Tilley proposes that all people who seek to engage with and understand a non-neutral 'humanized' space have a human body, and will therefore engage with the landscape in similar ways. By paying close attention to, and documenting, their bodily engagement with the archaeological site and landscape, Tilley says that archaeologists can use phenomenology to better understand prehistoric humanized space. Phenomenological methods therefore include approaching a place from different directions, experiencing it from every angle, spending time there, and exploring its relationships to other landmarks such that one starts to develop "a feeling for the place." Tilley says that this process allows one to make observations one never could have otherwise. Phenomenological methods are therefore highly reliant on the archaeologists own senses of sight, smell, and hearing as they enter and move about the landscape that they are studying.

== Phenomenology in Alternative Representations ==
According to Christopher Tilley in The Materiality of Stone, phenomenological approaches in archaeology are focused on an embodied experience of the archaeological landscape. Therefore, representational forms of archaeological features such as diagrams, pictures, statistical analyses, geographic information systems, simulations, or narrative descriptions are said to be inadequate to produce phenomenological knowledge or understanding, as they cannot be substituted for first-hand experience. Other archaeologists have found various representational tools useful for expanding one's phenomenological analyses.

Geographical Information Systems

Geographic information systems (GIS) have also been employed to augment phenomenological approaches. Due to the intensive nature of phenomenological methods, sample sizes tend to be small, making it difficult to validate relationships identified through phenomenological research. However, for relationships such as intervisibility between archaeological monuments and landscape features, GIS analyses such as visibility analyses can quickly provide estimations of this experience for a large number of archaeological features. Researchers have paired visibility analyses with models of movement to better understand Spanish colonial surveillance and the effects of colonial architecture in the Andean Highlands. Similar approaches have also been used to model soundsheds in Chaco Canyon, to better understand Ancestral Puebloan ritual and political theater. However, Geographical Information Systems modeling has been critiqued for reifying the Cartesian model of space, and the abstract nature of GIS analyses are far removed from the usually embodied, experiential focus of phenomenological methodologies.

Virtual Reality Modeling

Virtual Reality Modeling (VRM) is one method that has been proposed for augmenting phenomenological approaches. Virtual reality representations overcome shortcomings of two dimensional representations such as maps, diagrams or pictures and allow researchers to digitally move through a space in a way that imitates an embodied experience without having to travel to the location. This allows for any researcher to verify and reproduce experiences of intervisibility, dimension, orientation, or other phenomenologically relevant observations. It can also provide experiences of a place that may not be available today by reconstructing elements of the landscape, removing modern structures, or simulating different environmental contexts. GIS and VRM are also being combined into augmented reality in an effort to "bridge the gap" and bring GIS insights into the phenomenological experience. Nevertheless, Pollard and Gillings say that their efforts in Virtual Reality Modeling are not intended to replace direct observation entirely, as it is impossible to simulate all of the bodily experiences of being at an actual place. Furthermore, like GIS, Virtual Reality Modeling has been critiqued for continuing to maintain a Cartesian model of space and centering of visual experience over other embodied experiences.

== Criticism ==
According to Joanna Brück, phenomenology "has provoked considerable discussion within the discipline", receiving criticism from members of the archaeological community who deem it to be "unscientific" and "subjective". Brück says the crucial phenomenological question is "whether contemporary encounters with the landscape [...] can ever approximate the actual experience of people in the past" and that, in spite of Christopher Tilley's claim that the common use of human bodies between archaeologists and past peoples implies that both groups will engage with the material world in a similar way, the body itself is culturally constituted and bodily engagement with the world will be shaped and controlled by social norms and practices. Therefore, it cannot be assumed that modern human experiences of a space will closely match those of the past simply because they may share a similar physical form. Barret and Ko say that Tilley's idea of a culturally neutral body separated from its history itself relies on a Cartesian separation of body and mind that is at odds with Heidegger's phenomenology which Tilley takes as a foundation for his methods. Therefore, they say that archaeological phenomenology as practiced is premised on a rejection of processual archaeology's claim to seek generalization cross-cultural historical processes, and a rejection of scientific archaeology's methodological consensus, rather than a philosophical alignment with phenomenology.

Others have critiqued the data and interpretations of Tilley and other phenomenological research. Andrew Fleming, says that many of Tilley's claims that certain megalith structures are oriented so their major axis points to particular landscape features are incorrect. Rather, Fleming claims that the monument's orientations often miss the features Tilley ascribes to them, or if they are oriented with the described feature they are often ignoring other landscape features which Fleming says are much more prominent Furthermore, Fleming says that Tilley's interpretations of Mesolithic megalithic structures fails to account for "the problem of differential site destruction", wherein structures that were constructed near rock outcrops are more likely to survive than those in appealing agricultural areas. Fleming says this difference could explain the apparent prevalence of megalithic structures near outcroppings observed by Tilley.

== Notable Applications ==
Phenomenological approaches have been supported by a great number of archaeologists and are often used in fieldwork alongside other, more traditional methods. Typical examples of the phenomenological approach to landscapes include Christopher Tilley's own recording of the Dorset Cursus, and Tilly's and Barbara Bender and Sue Hamilton's work on the Bronze Age landscapes of Bodmin Moor, England. It was also used to develop an understanding of the famous Neolithic villaggi trincerati of the Tavoliere Plain in Puglia, Italy, in an effort to more explicitly define phenomenological methodologies. Other researchers have used phenomenology to explore the subjectivity of archaeologists, embracing poetic descriptions of history, and performative tellings of the past as well as archeological ones,
