= Post-processual archaeology =

Theoretical paradigm in archaeology

Post-processual archaeology, which is sometimes alternatively referred to as the interpretative archaeologies by its adherents, is a movement in archaeological theory that emphasizes the subjectivity of archaeological interpretations. Despite having a vague series of similarities, post-processualism consists of "very diverse strands of thought coalesced into a loose cluster of traditions". Within the post-processualist movement, a wide variety of theoretical viewpoints have been embraced, including structuralism and Neo-Marxism, as have a variety of different archaeological techniques, such as phenomenology.

The post-processual movement originated in the United Kingdom during the late 1970s and early 1980s, pioneered by archaeologists such as Ian Hodder, Daniel Miller, Christopher Tilley and Peter Ucko, who were influenced by French Marxist anthropology, postmodernism and similar trends in sociocultural anthropology. Parallel developments soon followed in the United States. Initially post-processualism was primarily a reaction to and critique of processual archaeology, a paradigm developed in the 1960s by 'New Archaeologists' such as Lewis Binford, and which had become dominant in Anglophone archaeology by the 1970s. Post-processualism was heavily critical of a key tenet of processualism, namely its assertion that archaeological interpretations could, if the scientific method was applied, come to completely objective conclusions.

In the United States, archaeologists widely see post-processualism as an accompaniment to the processual movement, while in the United Kingdom, they remain largely thought of as separate and opposing theoretical movements. In other parts of the world, post-processualism has made less of an impact on archaeological thought.

== Approach to archaeology ==
=== Subjectivism ===
The post-processualists' approach to archaeology is diametrically opposed to that of the processualists. The processualists, as positivists, believed that the scientific method should and could apply to archaeological investigation, therefore allowing archaeologists to present objective statements about past societies based upon the evidence. Post-processual archaeology, however, questioned this stance, and instead emphasized that archaeology was subjective rather than objective, and that what truth could be ascertained from the archaeological record was often relative to the viewpoint of the archaeologist responsible for unearthing and presenting the data. As the archaeologist Matthew Johnson noted, "Postprocessualists suggest that we can never confront theory and data; instead, we see data through a cloud of theory."

=== Interpretation ===
Due to the fact that they believe archaeology to be inherently subjective, post-processualists argue that "all archaeologists... whether they overtly admit it or not", always impose their own views and biases into their interpretations of the archaeological data. In many cases, they hold that this bias is political in nature. Post-processualist Daniel Miller believed that the positivist approach of the processualists, in holding that only that which could be sensed, tested and predicted was valid, only sought to produce technical knowledge that facilitated the oppression of ordinary people by elites. In a similar criticism, Miller and Chris Tilley believed that by putting forward the concept that human societies were irresistibly shaped by external influences and pressures, archaeologists were tacitly accepting social injustice. Many post-processualists took this further and criticised the fact that archaeologists from wealthy, Western countries were studying and writing the histories of poorer nations in the Second and Third Worlds. Ian Hodder stated that archaeologists had no right to interpret the prehistories of other ethnic or cultural groups, and that instead they should simply provide individuals from these groups with the ability to construct their own views of the past. While Hodder's viewpoint was not universally accepted among post-processualists, there was enough support for opposing racism, colonialism and professional elitism within the discipline that in 1986 the World Archaeological Congress was established.

A number of post-processualists, such as Michael Shanks, Christopher Tilley and Peter Ucko, undermined "archaeology's claims to be an authoritative source of knowledge about the past", thereby "encourag[ing] people to question and resist all forms of authority… This position was hailed by its supporters as democratizing archaeology and purging it… of elitist pretensions".

== Understanding past societies ==
=== Materialism and idealism ===
Whereas the processualists had been firm materialists, and the culture-historical archaeologists had, by contrast, been idealists, the post-processualists argued that past societies should be interpreted through both materialist and idealist ideas. As Johnson noted, "Many postprocessualists claim that we should reject the whole opposition between material and ideal in the first place." While recognizing that past societies would have interpreted the world around them in a partially materialistic way, the post-processualists argue that many historic societies have also placed a great emphasis on ideology (which included religion) in both interpreting their world and influencing their behaviour. Examples of this can be seen in the work of Bernard Knapp, who examined how the social elite manipulated ideology to maintain their political and economic control, and of Mike Parker Pearson, who asserted that tools were just as much a product of ideology as were a crown or a law code.

Using an example to explain this belief in materialist-idealist unity, the archaeologist Matthew Johnson looked at the idea of landscape among past societies. He argued that:

On the one hand, a materialist view of landscape tends to stress how it may be seen in terms of a set of resources, for example for hunter-gatherers or early farming groups. This leads one to turn, for example, to optimal foraging theory and other economic models for an understanding of how people exploited the landscape 'rationally'. Postprocessualists like to argue that landscapes are always viewed in different ways by different peoples. They reject the 'rational' view of 'landscape-as-a-set-of-resources' as that of our own society and one that is ideologically loaded in its own way, loaded towards ideas of commodity and exploitation found in our own society. They suggest that ancient peoples would have had different views of what was 'real' in that landscape. On the other hand, an exclusively idealist view of landscape does not work either. Postprocessualists like to stress that such an understanding of landscape was not formed in the abstract—that the way people moved around and used that landscape affected their understanding of it.

=== Structuralism ===
Many, although not all post-processualists have adhered to the theory of structuralism in understanding historical societies. Structuralism itself was a theory developed by the French anthropologist Claude Lévi-Strauss (1908–2009), and held to the idea that "cultural patterns need not be caused by anything outside themselves… [and that] underlying every culture was a deep structure, or essence, governed by its own laws, that people were unaware of but which ensured regularities in the cultural productions that emanate from it." At the centre of his structuralist theory, Lévi-Strauss held that "all human thought was governed by conceptual dichotomies, or bilateral oppositions, such as culture/nature, male/female, day/night, and life/death. He believed that the principle of oppositions was a universal characteristic inherent in the human brain, but that each culture was based on a unique selection of oppositions". This structuralist approach was first taken from anthropology and applied into forms of archaeology by the French archaeologist André Leroi-Gourhan (1911–1986), who used it to interpret prehistoric symbols in his 1964 work, Les Religions de la Préhistoire.

Within the post-processual movement, Ian Hodder became "the leading exponent of a structuralist approach". In a 1984 article, he looked at the similarities between the houses and the tombs of Neolithic Europe, and used a structuralist approach as a basis for his ideas on their symbolism. He then went on, in his seminal book The Domestication of Europe (1990), to use structuralist ideas to come up with his theory that within Neolithic Europe, there was a dichotomy between field (agrios) and house (domus), with this duality being mediated by a boundary (foris).

=== Human agency ===
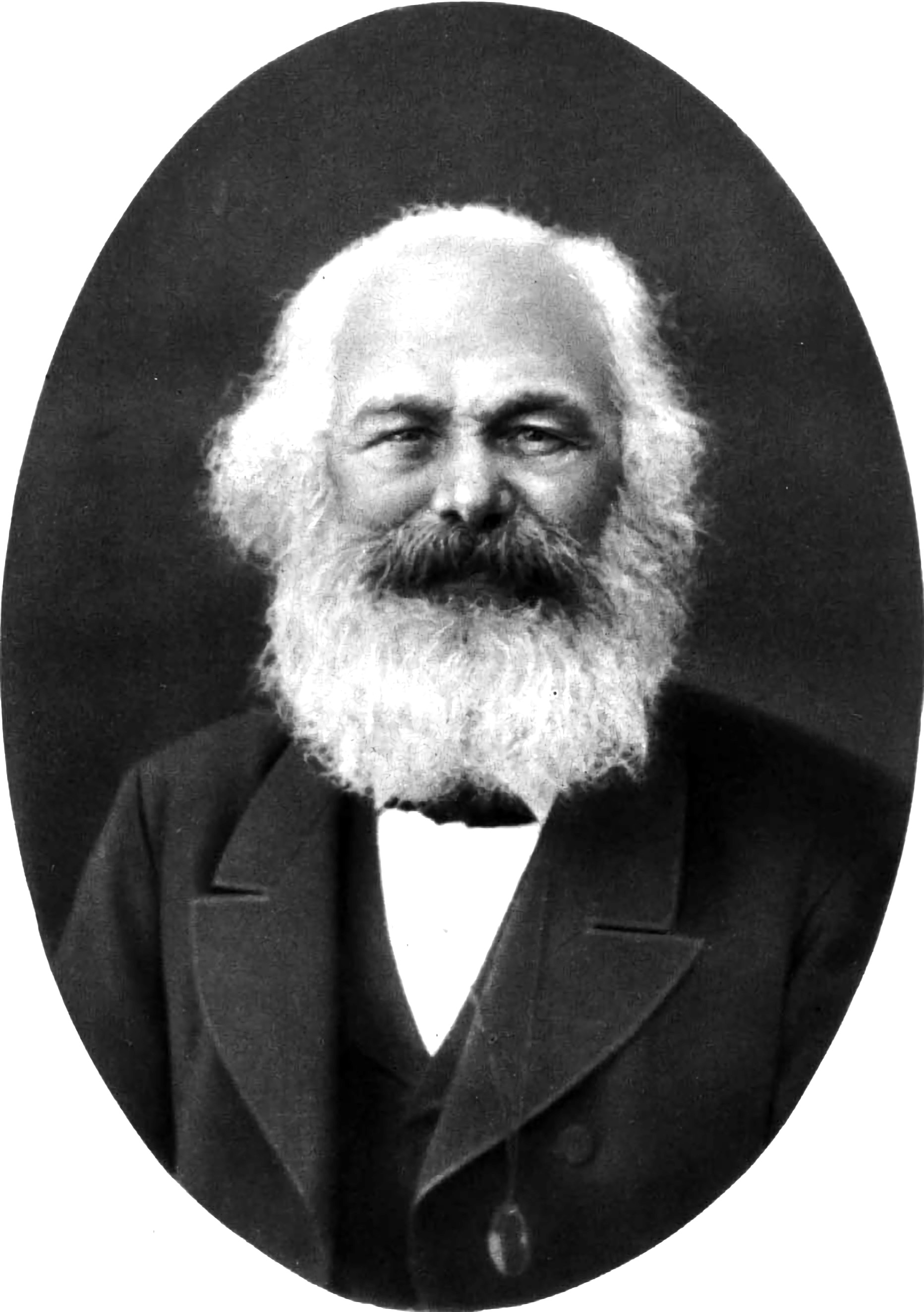
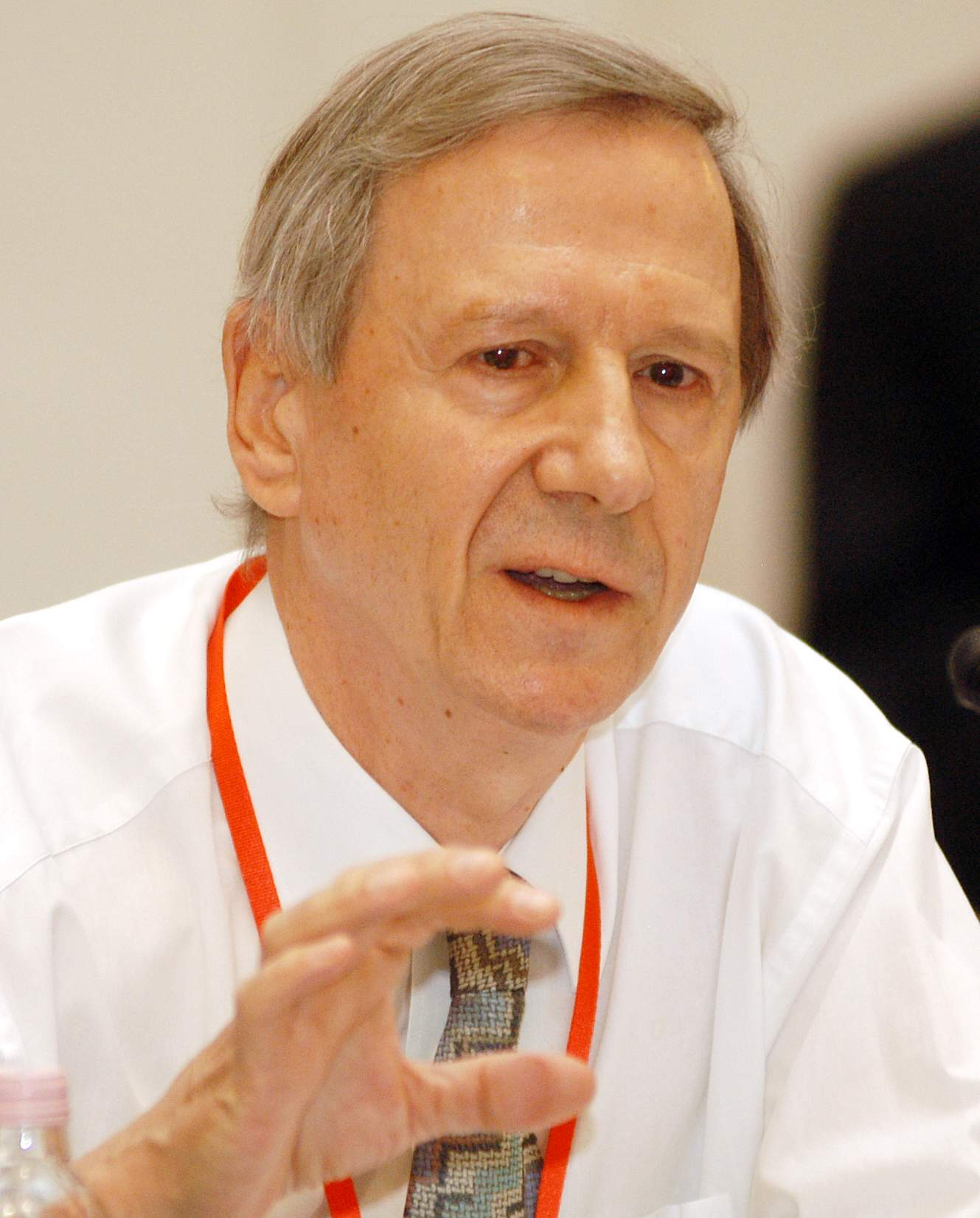
Sociologists Karl Marx and Anthony Giddens were influential figures in the development of post-processual ideas about human agency.

Post-processualists have also adopted beliefs regarding human agency, arguing that in other theoretical approaches to archaeology such as cultural-historical and processual, "the individual is lost", and humans are therefore portrayed as "passive dupes who blindly follow social rules." Post-processualists instead argue that humans are free agents who in many cases act in their own interests rather than simply following societal rules, and by accepting these ideas, post-processualists argue that society is conflict-driven. Influenced by the sociologist Anthony Giddens (born 1938) and his structuration theory, many post-processualists accepted that most human beings, while knowing and understanding the rules of their society, choose to manipulate them rather than following them obediently. In turn, by bending the societal rules, these rules eventually change.

Other post-processualists have instead taken the view of sociologist Karl Marx (1818–1883) that class conflict was the force for this social change. In this manner they share similarities with Marxist archaeologists. A minority of post-processualists, such as Julian Thomas have however argued that human agency is not a useful aspect for looking at past societies, thereby accepting a culturally determinist position.

== Marginalised archaeologies ==
Post-processualism places great emphasis on encouraging marginalised groups to interact with archaeology.

=== Gender archaeology ===
In the 1960s and 1970s, feminist archaeology emerged as adherents of the second wave feminist movement began to argue that women in the archaeological record had been ignored by archaeologists up until that time. According to archaeologist Sam Lucy, "The agendas of feminist archaeology and post-processualism highlighted the importance of social and political factors on supposedly 'objective' investigation".

== History ==
=== Precedents ===
Although it would not be actually termed "post-processual archaeology" until 1985 (by one of its most prominent proponents, Ian Hodder), an archaeological alternative to processual archaeology had begun to develop during the 1970s. Some had already anticipated the theory's emergence, with the social anthropologist Edmund Leach informing the assembled archaeologists at a 1971 discussion on the topic of "The Explanation of Culture Change" held at the University of Sheffield that cultural structuralism, which was then popular among social anthropologists, would soon make its way into the archaeological community.

Bruce Trigger, a Canadian archaeologist who produced a seminal study of archaeological theory, identified the existence of three main influences upon post-processualism. The first of these was "the Marxist-inspired social anthropology that had developed in France during the 1960s and already had influenced British social anthropology." This, Trigger noted, "had its roots not in orthodox Marxism but in efforts to combine Marxism and structuralism by anthropologists such as Maurice Godelier, Emmanuel Terray, and Pierre-Phillipe Rey". The second main influence was postmodernism, which "emphasized the subjective nature of knowledge and embraced extreme relativism and idealism". Having originated among the disciplines of comparative literature, literary criticism and cultural studies, postmodernist thinking had begun to develop within archaeology. The third influence identified by Trigger was the New cultural anthropology movement within the cultural anthropological discipline, which had arisen after the collapse of Boasian anthropology. The new cultural anthropologists "denounced studies of cultural evolution as being ethnocentric and intellectually and morally untenable in a multicultural, postcolonial environment."

=== Origins in Britain ===
Post-processual archaeology began in Britain during the late 1970s, spearheaded by a number of British archaeologists who had become interested in aspects of French Marxist anthropology. Most prominent among these was Ian Hodder (born 1948), a former processualist who had made a name for himself for his economic analysis of spatial patterns and early development of simulation studies, particularly relating to trade, markets and urbanization in Iron Age and Roman Britain. Having been influenced by the "New Geography" and the work of the processualist David Clarke, as his research progressed, he became increasingly sceptical that such models and simulations actually tested or proved anything, coming to the conclusion that a particular pattern in the archaeological record could be produced by a number of different simulated processes, and that there was no way to accurately test which of these alternatives was correct. In effect, he came to believe that even using the processual approach to understanding archaeological data, there were still many different ways that that data could be interpreted, and that therefore radically different conclusions could be put forward by different archaeologists, despite processualism's claim that using the scientific method it could gain objective fact from the archaeological record. As a result of this, Hodder grew increasingly critical of the processualist approach, developing an interest in how culture shaped human behaviour. He was supported in this new endeavour by many of his students, including Matthew Spriggs.

In 1980 these early post-processualists held a conference at Cambridge University, from which a book was produced, entitled Symbolic and Structural Archaeology (1982), which was edited by Hodder himself and published by Cambridge University Press. In his introduction to the book, Hodder noted that:

During the early period of exploration and development of ideas, premature conference presentations and individual seminars were given by various members of the Cambridge group in other archaeological departments in England and abroad. Individual scholars who were invited to talk to us in Cambridge in that period often felt, understandably, obliged to maintain a distinct opposition. While it is certainly the case that these presentations had occurred before our views had even begun to settle down, and that they were excessively aggressive, they played an important role in the process of enquiry and reformulation. In particular, the contrasts which were set up by us and by outside scholars allowed the views of the seminar group, and the differences of viewpoint within the group, to be clarified. The opposition highlighted our own opinion but also threw the spotlight on the blind alleys down which there was a danger of straying. Our aggression resulted from the conviction that we were doing something new. This, too, was important. In the initial period there was a clear idea of what was wrong with existing approaches and there was a faith that something else could be done.

Bruce Trigger considered this book to be "a postprocessual showcase and counterpart to New Perspectives in Archaeology", the 1968 book written by American archaeologist Lewis Binford (1931–2011) that helped to launch the processual movement.

=== Development in the United States ===
Post-processual archaeology developed largely independently among the archaeological community in the United States. As such its primary influence was critical theory, as opposed to the French Marxist anthropology which had been the primary influence upon their British counterparts. Many American archaeologists had begun to recognise issues of bias within the scientific community, and within the processual movement itself which attempted to be scientific. They also began to notice elements of ethnic prejudice within archaeology, particularly in regards to Native American peoples, who had commonly not had a chance to participate in their own heritage management up until the 1990s. Many American archaeologists also began to take note of a gender bias in the archaeological interpretation and in the discipline as a whole, as women had been largely marginalised. The 1980s saw archaeological studies finally being published that dealt with this issue, namely through Joan Gero's paper on "Gender bias in archaeology: a cross-cultural perspective" (1983) and Margaret Conkey and Janet Spector's paper on "Archaeology and the Study of Gender" (1984). Among the post-processualists, less emphasis was put on correcting class biases in the American archaeological record than had been put into studying gender and ethnic differences. Instead, it was mostly among historical archaeologists (those who study the archaeology of the historic, or literate period of the past), that such investigation into marginalised classes such as workers and slaves took place.

== Criticism ==
As the archaeologists Colin Renfrew and Paul Bahn noted, "For its most severe critics, [post-processualism], while making a number of valid criticisms, simply developed some of the ideas and theoretical problems introduced by [processualism]. To these critics it brought in a variety of approaches from other disciplines, so that the term "postprocessual," while rather neatly echoing the epithet "postmodern" in literary studies, was a shade arrogant in presuming to supersede what it might quite properly claim to complement."

In their article "Processual Archaeology and the Radical Critique" (1987), Timothy K. Earle and Robert W. Preucel examined the post-processual movement's "radical critique" of processualism, and while accepting that it had some merit and highlighted some important points, they came to the conclusion that on the whole, the post-processual approach was flawed because it failed to produce an explicit methodology.
