= Barbara Bender =

Anthropologist, archaeologist and academic

Barbara Bender is an anthropologist and archaeologist. She is currently Emeritus Professor of Heritage Anthropology at University College London.

== Career ==
Bender studied for a PhD on the Neolithic of Northern France at the Institute of Archaeology, London. From 1967-68 she was assistant professor at the University of Illinois, Chicago. In 1972 Bender was a Lecturer in the Department of Extra-Mural Studies of London University. Her first monograph Farming in Prehistory, published in 1975, was described as a 'painstaking compilation' of archaeological evidence on the development of agriculture.

Later she moved to the Department of Anthropology, UCL, being one of several material-culture focused anthropologists within the department in the late 1970s and early 1980s alongside Daniel Miller and John Gledhill. Bender's later work utilised a phenomenological approach to landscape, collaborating with Sue Hamilton and Christopher Tilley. In the late 1990s, Bender, Hamilton and Tilley developed a landscape research project, with the support of UCL students, that focused on the Bronze Age settlement and stone circle at Leskernick on Bodmin Moor. Bender's study of Stonehenge is considered a seminal work in considering archaeological sites as historically dynamic, with numerous stakeholders.

== Additional information ==
Barbara has been involved with the Branscombe Project in Devon where she lives since it started in 1992 writing under her married name, Farquharson. Jan Farquharson her husband died 2001. Her 2023/6 book, The Burnt House at Weston, Branscombe, published by the Branscombe Project was written with her late partner the historian, John Torrance, d. 2021.

== Selected publications ==
- Bender, B. and Phillips, P. 1972. The early farmers of France. Antiquity 46(182): 97-105.
- Bender, B. 1975. Farming in Prehistory - from Hunter-Gatherer to Food Producer, illustrations by Annabel Rowe & Jan Farquharson, London: John Baker.
- Goodall, V.M. and Bender, B. 1975. The Quest for Man. London: Phaidon.
- Bender, B. 1978. Gatherer-hunter to farmer: A social perspective. World Archaeology 10(2): 204-222.
- Bender, B. 1985. Emergent tribal formations in the American Midcontinent. American Antiquity 50 (1): 52-62.
- Bender, B. 1986. The Archaeology of Brittany, Normandy, and the Channel Islands. London: Faber and Faber.
- Gledhill, J., Bender, B., and Larsen, M.T. 1988. State and Society: the Emergence and Development of Social Hierarchy and Political Centralization. London: Unwin Hyman.
- Bender, B. 1989. towards a theory of social evolution - on State systems and ideological shells. In Miller, D., Rowlands, M.J. and Tilley, C.Y. Domination and Resistance. London: Unwin Hyman.
- Bender, B. 1992. Theorising Landscapes, and the Prehistoric Landscapes of Stonehenge. Man, 27(4), new series, 735-755. doi:10.2307/2804172
- Bender, B. and Edmonds, M. 1992. Stonehenge: whose past? What past? Tourism Management 13(4): 355-357.
- Bender, B. 1993 (ed.) Landscape: Politics and Perspectives. Oxford: Berg.
- Bender, B, Hamilton, S., and Tilley, C. 1997. Leskernick: Stone worlds, alternative narratives, nested landscapes. Proceedings of the Prehistoric Society 63: 147-178.
- Bender, B. 1998. Stonehenge: Making Space. Oxford: Berg.
- Hamilton, S., Tilley, C. and Bender, B. 1999. Bronze Age stone worlds of Bodmin Moor: excavating Leskernick. Archaeology International 3: 13–17.
- Bender, B. 2000. ‘Investigating Landscape and Identity in the Neolithic’, in A. Ritchie (ed.) Neolithic Orkney in its European Context, pp. 223–230. Cambridge: McDonald Institute Monographs.
- Bender, B. 2001. Landscapes on-the-move. Journal of Social Anthropology 1(1): 75-89.
- Bender, B. and Winer, M. (eds) 2001. Contested Landscapes: Movement, Exile and Place. Oxford: Berg.
- Bender, B. 2002. Time and landscape. Current Anthropology 43: S103-S112.
- Tilley, C., Hamilton, S., Bender, B. 2003. Art and re-presentation of the past. Journal of the Royal Anthropological Institute 6(1): 35-62.
- Hamilton, S., Harrison, S., and Bender, B. 2008. "Conflicting Imaginations: Archaeology, Anthropology and Geomorphology on Leskernick Hill, Bodmin Moor, Southwest Britain." Geoforum 39 (2): 602-15.
- Bender, B., Hamilton, S., and Tilley, C. 2016. Stone Worlds: Narrative and Reflexivity in Landscape Archaeology. London: Routledge.
- B. Farquharson & Torrance J. 2026, The Burnt House at Weston, Branscombe, Winners & Loosers in an Eighteenth-centuary Devon Landscape, The Branscombe Project 2026.
