= Culture-historical archaeology =

Theoretical paradigm in archaeology

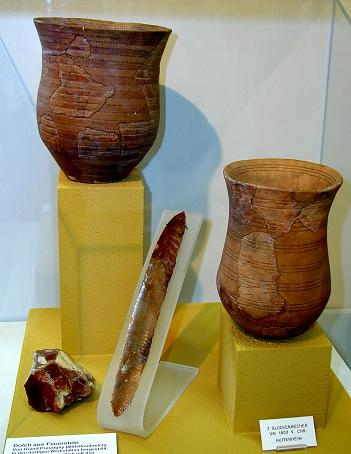
Items from the Neolithic "Beaker culture"; the idea of defining distinct "cultures" according to their material culture was at the core of culture-historical archaeology.

Culture-historical archaeology is an archaeological theory that emphasises defining historical societies into distinct ethnic and cultural groupings according to their material culture.

It originated in the late nineteenth century as cultural evolutionism began to fall out of favor with many antiquarians and archaeologists. It was gradually superseded in the mid-twentieth century by processual archaeology. Cultural-historical archaeology had in many cases been influenced by a nationalist political agenda, being utilised to prove a direct cultural and/or ethnic link from prehistoric and ancient peoples to modern nation-states, something that has in many respects been disproved by later research and archaeological evidence.

First developing in Germany among those archaeologists surrounding Rudolf Virchow, culture-historical ideas would later be popularised by Gustaf Kossinna. Culture-historical thought would be introduced to British archaeology by the Australian archaeologist V. Gordon Childe in the late 1920s. In the United Kingdom and United States, culture-history came to be supplanted as the dominant theoretical paradigm in archaeology during the 1960s, with the rise of processual archaeology. Nevertheless, elsewhere in the world, culture-historical ideas continue to dominate.

== Background ==
Webster remarked that the defining feature of culture-historical archaeology was its "statements which reveal common notions about the nature of ancient cultures; about their qualities; about how they related to the material record; and thus about how archaeologists might effectively study them."

Webster noted that the second defining feature of culture-historical thought was its emphasis on classification and typologies.

== Causes ==
Culture-historical archaeology arose during a somewhat tumultuous time in European intellectual thought. The Industrial Revolution had spread across many nations, leading to the creation of large urban centres, most of which were filled with poverty stricken proletarian workers. This new urban working class had begun to develop a political voice through socialism, threatening the established political orders of many European states. Whilst some intellectuals had championed the Industrial Revolution as a progressive step forward, there were many who had seen it as a negative turn of events, disrupting the established fabric of society. This latter view was taken up by the Romanticist movement, which was largely made up of artists and writers, who popularised the idea of an idyllic ancient agrarian society.

There was also a trend that was developing among the European intelligentsia that began to oppose the concept of cultural evolutionism (that culture and society gradually evolved and progressed through stages), instead taking the viewpoint that human beings were inherently resistant to change.

=== Geographic variability and the concept of "culture" ===
Historian of archaeology Bruce Trigger considered the development of culture-historical archaeology to be "a response to growing awareness of geographical variability in the archaeological record" at a time when the belief in cultural evolutionary archaeology was declining in western and central Europe. Throughout the 19th century, an increasing amount of archaeological material had been collected in Europe, in part as a result of land reclamation projects, increased agricultural production and construction, the foundation of museums and establishment of archaeological teaching positions at universities. As a result of this, archaeologists had come to increasingly realise that there was a great deal of variability in the artifacts uncovered across the continent. Many felt that this variability was not comfortably explained by preexisting evolutionary paradigms.

Culture-historical archaeology adopted the concept of "culture" from anthropology, where cultural evolutionary ideas had also begun to be criticised. In the late 19th century, anthropologists like Franz Boas and Friedrich Ratzel were promoting the idea that cultures represented geographically distinct entities, each with their own characteristics that had developed largely through the chance accumulation of different traits. Similar ideas were also coming from Germany's neighbour, Austria, at around this time, namely from two anthropologist Roman Catholic priests, Fritz Graebner and Wilhelm Schmidt, as well as by the archaeologist Oswald Menghin.

=== Nationalism and racialism ===
The rise of European nationalism in the 19th century played a key role in the development of culture-historical archaeology.

Bruce Trigger also argued that the development of culture-historical archaeology was in part due to the rising tide of nationalism and racism in Europe, which emphasised ethnicity as the main factor shaping history. Such nationalistic sentiment began to be adopted within academic disciplines by intellectuals who wished to emphasise solidarity within their own nations – in the face of social unrest caused by industrialization – by blaming neighbouring states. Under such a nationalist worldview, people across Europe came to see different nationalities – such as the French, Germans and English – as being biologically different from one another, and it was argued that their behaviour was determined by these racial differences as opposed to social or economic factors.

Having been inspired and influenced by European nationalism, in turn, culture-historical archaeology was utilised in support of nationalist political causes. In many cases, nationalists used culture-historical archaeological interpretations to highlight and celebrate the prehistoric and ancient past of their ancestors, and prove an ethnic and cultural link to them. As such, many members of various European nations placed an emphasis on archaeologically proving a connection with a particular historical ethnicity, for instance the French often maintained that they were the ethnic and cultural descendants of the ancient Gauls, whilst the English did the same with the Anglo-Saxons and the Welsh and Irish with the Celts, and archaeologists in these countries were encouraged to interpret the archaeological evidence to fit these conclusions.

One of the most notable examples of a nationalist movement utilising culture-historical archaeology was that of the Nazi Party, who obtained power in Germany in 1933 and established a totalitarian regime that emphasised the alleged racial supremacy of the German race and sought to unify all German speakers under a single political state. The Nazis were influenced by the culture-historical ideas of Kossinna, and used archaeology to support their claims regarding the behaviour of prehistoric Germans, in turn supporting their own policies.

== History ==
=== Early development: 1869–1925 ===
Culture-historical archaeology first developed in Germany in the late 19th century. In 1869, the German Society for Anthropology, Ethnology, and Prehistoric Archaeology (Urgeschichte) had been founded, an organisation that was dominated by the figure of Rudolf Virchow (1821–1902), a pathologist and leftist politician. He advocated the union of prehistoric archaeology with cultural anthropology and ethnology into a singular prehistoric anthropology which would identify prehistoric cultures from the material record and try to connect them to later ethnic groups who were recorded in the written, historical record. Although the archaeological work undertaken by Virchow and his fellows was cultural-historical in basis, it did not initially gain a significant following in the country's archaeological community, the majority of whom remained devoted to the dominant cultural evolutionary trend.

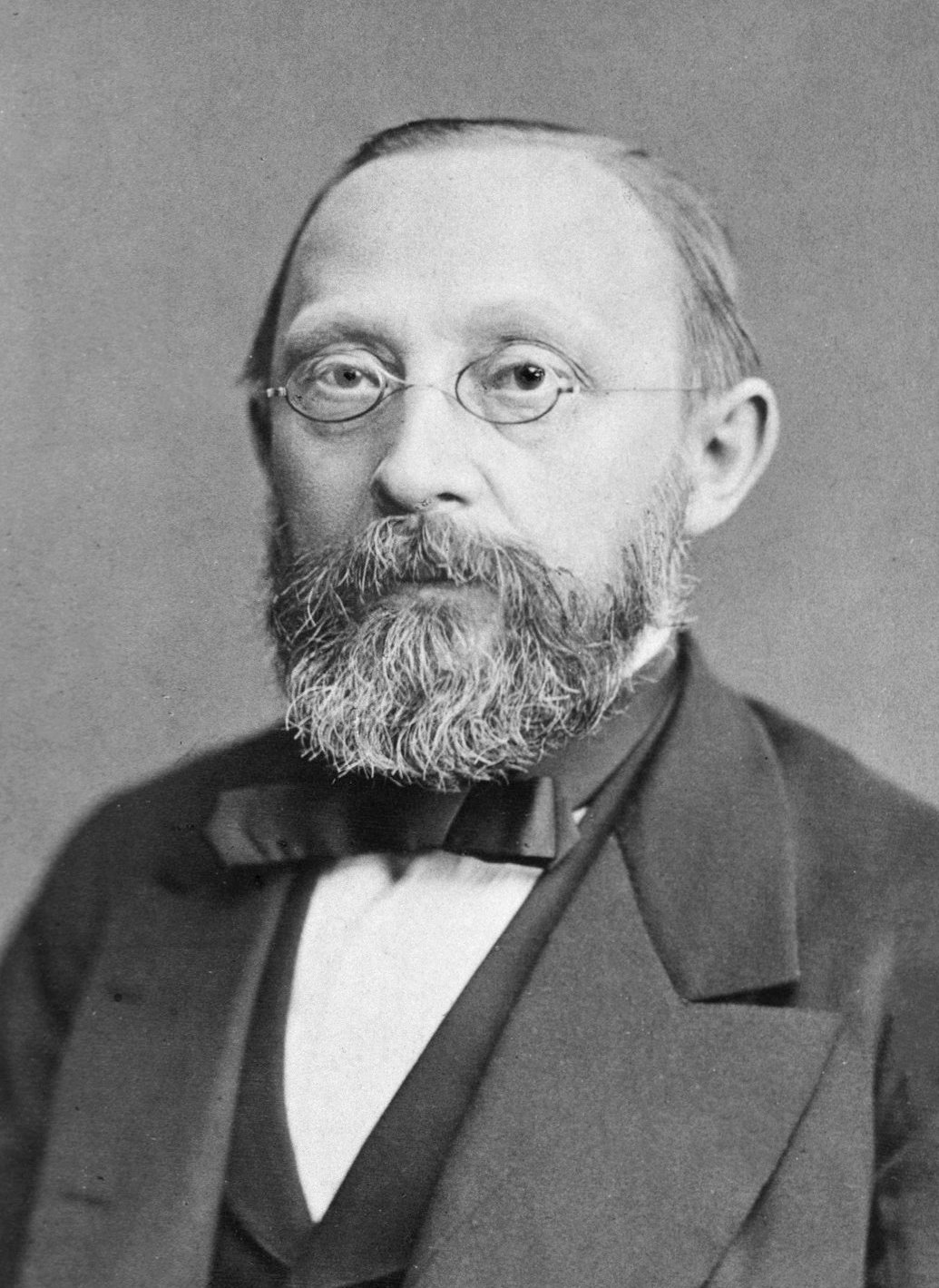
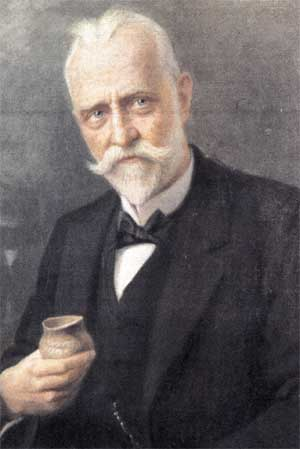
The German anthropologist Rudolf Virchow (left) and historian Gustaf Kossinna (right) were the founding fathers of culture-historical archaeology.

In 1895, a librarian who was fascinated by German prehistory, Gustaf Kossinna (1858–1931), presented a lecture in which he tried to connect the tribes who had been recorded as living between the Rhine and Vistula in 100 BCE with cultures living in that region during the Neolithic. Appointed Professor of Archaeology at the University of Berlin, in 1909 he founded the German Society for Prehistory (Vorgeschichte). He would proceed to further publicise his culture-historical approach in his subsequent books, Die Herkunft der Germanen (The Origin of the Germans), which was published in 1911, and the two-volume Ursprung und Verbreitung der Germanen (Origin and Expansion of the Germans), which was published between 1926 and 1927. A staunch nationalist and racist, Kossinna lambasted fellow German archaeologists for taking an interest in non-German societies, such as those of Egypt and the Classical World, and used his publications to support his views on German nationalism. Glorifying the German peoples of prehistory, he used an explicitly culture-historical approach in understanding them, and proclaimed that these German peoples were racially superior to their Slavic neighbours to the east.

Believing that an individual's ethnicity determined their behaviour, the core of Kossinna's approach was to divide Temperate Europe into three large cultural groupings: Germans, Celts and Slavs, based upon the modern linguistic groups. He then divided each of these cultural groupings into smaller "cultures", or tribes, for instance dividing the Germans up into Saxons, Vandals, Lombards and Burgundians. He believed that each of these groups had its own distinctive traditions which were present in their material culture, and that by mapping out the material culture in the archaeological record, he could trace the movement and migration of different ethnic groups, a process he called siedlungsarchäologie (settlement archaeology). Much of Kossinna's work was criticised by other German archaeologists, but nevertheless his basic culture-historical manner of interpreting the past still came to dominance in the country's archaeological community; Trigger noted that his work "marked the final replacement of an evolutionary approach to prehistory by a culture-historical one" and that for that, he must be viewed as an "innovator" whose work was "of very great importance".

As it became the dominant archaeological theory within the discipline, a number of prominent cultural-historical archaeologists rose to levels of influence. The Swedish archaeologist Oscar Montelius was one of the most notable, as he studied the entirety of the European archaeological prehistoric record, and divided it into a number of distinct temporal groups based upon grouping together various forms of artifacts.

=== Britain and the U.S. ===
"We find certain types of remains – pots, implements, ornaments, burial rites, house forms – constantly recurring together. Such a complex of regularly associated traits we shall term a 'cultural group' or just a 'culture'. We assume that such a complex is the material expression of what today would be called a people."

— Gordon Childe, The Danube in Prehistory, 1929.

Culture-historical archaeology was first introduced into British scholarship from continental Europe by an Australian prehistorian, V. Gordon Childe. A keen linguist, Childe was able to master a number of European languages, including German, and was well acquainted with the works on archaeological cultures written by Kossina. Following a period as Private Secretary to the Premier of New South Wales (NSW), Childe moved to London in 1921 for a position with the NSW Agent General, then spent a few years travelling Europe. In 1927, Childe took up a position as the Abercrombie Professor of Archaeology at the University of Edinburgh. This was followed by The Danube in Prehistory (1929), in which Childe examined the archaeology along the Danube river, recognising it as the natural boundary dividing the Near East from Europe, and subsequently he believed that it was via the Danube that various new technologies travelled westward in antiquity. In The Danube in Prehistory, Childe introduced the concept of an archaeological culture (which up until then had been largely restrained purely to German academics), to his British counterparts. This concept would revolutionise the way in which archaeologists understood the past, and would come to be widely accepted in future decades.

== Concepts ==
=== Distinct historical cultures ===
The core point to culture-historical archaeology was its belief that the human species could be subdivided into various "cultures" that were in many cases distinct from one another. Usually, each of these cultures was seen as representing a different ethnicity. From an archaeological perspective, it was believed that each of these cultures could be distinguished because of its material culture, such as the style of pottery that it produced or the forms of burial that it practiced.

A number of culture-historical archaeologists subdivided and named separate cultures within their field of expertise: for instance, archaeologists working in the Aegean, in examining the Bronze Age period, divided it up between such cultures as Minoan, Helladic and Cycladic.

=== Diffusion and migration ===
Within culture-historical archaeology, changes in the culture of a historical society were typically explained by the diffusion of ideas from one culture into another, or by the migration of members of one society into a new area, sometimes by invasion. This was at odds with the theories held by cultural evolutionary archaeologists, who whilst accepting diffusion and migration as reasons for cultural change, also accepted the concept that independent cultural development could occur within a society, which was something culture-historical archaeologists typically refused to accept.

A number of culture-historical archaeologists put forward the idea that all knowledge and technology in the ancient world had diffused from a single source in the Middle East, which had then been spread across much of the world by merchants. The Australian Grafton Elliot Smith for instance, in his works The Children of the Sun (1923) and The Growth of Civilisation (1924), put forward the idea that agriculture, architecture, religion and government had all developed in Ancient Egypt, where the conditions were perfect for the development of such things, and that these ideas were then diffused into other cultures. A similar theory was proposed by Lord Raglan in 1939, but he believed Mesopotamia to be the source rather than Egypt.

=== Inductive reasoning ===
Culture history uses inductive reasoning unlike its main rival, processual archaeology which stresses the importance of the hypothetico-deduction method. To work best it requires a historical record to support it. As much of early archaeology focused on the Classical World it naturally came to rely on and mirror the information provided by ancient historians who could already explain many of the events and motivations which would not necessarily survive in the archaeological record. The need to explain prehistoric societies, without this historical record, could initially be dealt with using the paradigms established for later periods but as more and more material was excavated and studied, it became clear that culture history could not explain it all.

Manufacturing techniques and economic behaviour can be easily explained through cultures and culture history approaches but more complex events and explanations, involving less concrete examples in the material record are harder for it to explain. In order to interpret prehistoric religious beliefs for example, an approach based on cultures provides little to go on. Culture historians could catalogue items but in order to look beyond the material record, towards anthropology and the scientific method, they would have had to abandon their reliance on material, 'inhuman,' cultures. Such approaches were the intent of processual archaeology.

Culture history is by no means useless or surpassed by more effective methods of thinking. Indeed, diffusionist explanations are still valid in many cases and the importance of describing and classifying finds has not gone away. Post-processual archaeologists stress the importance of recurring patterns in material culture, echoing culture history's approach. In many cases it can be argued that any explanation is only one factor within a whole network of influences.

== Criticism ==
Another criticism of this particular archaeological theory was that it often placed an emphasis on studying peoples from the Neolithic and later ages, somewhat ignoring the earliest human era, the Palaeolithic, where distinct cultural groups and differences are less noticeable in the archaeological record.

== See also ==
- List of archaeological periods
- Nationalism and archaeology
