= Susanne Küchler =

German anthropologist

Susanne Küchler, FBA is a German anthropologist and academic, who specialises in material culture. Since 2006, she has been a professor at University College London. She previously worked at the University of East Anglia and the Johns Hopkins University.

== Early life and education ==
Küchler studied anthropology at the Free University of Berlin in Germany, graduating with a magister degree in 1981. She then moved to England to undertake postgraduate research in anthropology at the London School of Economics and Political Science. She completed her Doctor of Philosophy (PhD) degree in 1985, and her doctoral thesis was titled "Malangan, Exchange and Regional Integration in Northern New Ireland, Papua New Guinea ".

== Academic career ==
For the 1985/1986 academic year, Küchler held a "New Blood Lectureship" in the history of non-western art at the School of Art History and Music of the University of East Anglia in Norwich, England. From 1986 to 1990, she was an assistant professor of anthropology and art history at the Johns Hopkins University in Baltimore, United States. In 1991, she joined University College London (UCL) in England as a part-time lecturer in anthropology. She was a full-time lecturer from 1994 to 1999, a senior lecturer from 1999 to 2002, and a Reader from 2002 to 2006. In September 2006, she was appointed Professor of Material Culture. In 2010, she became head of the Department of Anthropology at UCL; she will hold the post for ten years.

Küchler has been co-editor of the Journal of Material Culture since 1996. She was co-editor of Art in Translation from 2008 to 2012.

=== Research ===
Küchler has undertaken fieldwork on New Ireland, Papua New Guinea and on the Cook Islands. From 2000 to 2004, she was principal investigator of "Clothing the Pacific: The Study of the nature of Innovation".

== Honours ==
In 2016, Küchler was elected a Fellow of the British Academy (FBA), the United Kingdom's national academy for the humanities and social sciences.

== Selected works ==
- Forty, Adrian; Küchler, Susanne, eds. (1999). The Art of Forgetting. Oxford: Berg. ISBN 978-1859732861.
- Kuchler, Susanne (2002). Malanggan: art, memory and sacrifice. Oxford: Berg. ISBN 978-1859736173.
- Küchler, Susanne; Were, Graeme (2005). Pacific Pattern. London: Thames & Hudson. ISBN 978-0500512371.
- Küchler, Susanne; Miller, Daniel, eds. (2006). Clothing as material culture. Oxford: Berg. ISBN 978-1845200664.
- Küchler, Susanne; Eimke, Andrea (2009). Tivaivai: The Social Fabric of the Cook Islands. London: British Museum Press. ISBN 978-0714125800.
- Tilley, Christopher; Keane, Webb; Küchler, Susanne; Rowlands, Mike; Spyer, Patricia (2013). Handbook of material culture. London: SAGE. ISBN 978-1446270561.
- Drazin, Adam; Küchler, Susanne, eds. (2015). The Social Life of Materials: Studies in Materials and Society. London: Bloomsbury Academic. ISBN 978-1472592644.
