= Sue Hamilton (archaeologist) =

British archaeologist and professor

Professor Sue Hamilton FSA
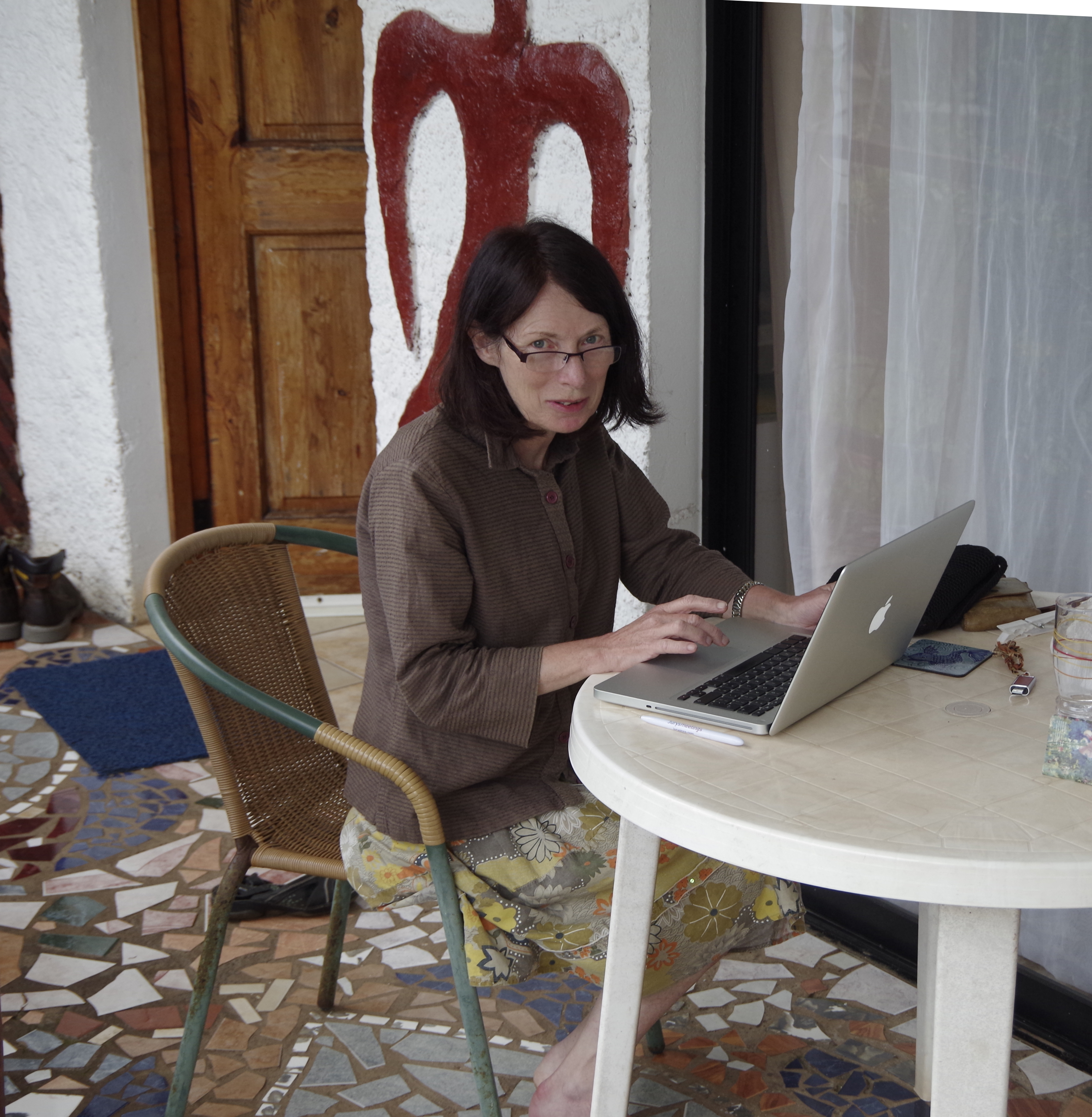
- Hamilton on Rapa Nui in 2015
- Born: Glasgow, Scotland
- Occupation: Professor of Prehistory
- Known for: Sensory archaeology The Leskernick Project, The Tavoliere-Gargano Prehistory Project, The Rapa Nui Landscapes of Construction Project Specialist studies in British prehistoric pottery

Academic background
- Education: UCL Institute of Archaeology
- Thesis: First Millennium BC Pottery Traditions in Southern Britain (1993)
- Doctoral advisor: Roy Hodson

Academic work
- Institutions: UCL Institute of Archaeology
- Notable works: Hillforts, monumentality and place (2001), Archaeology and Women (2006), Stone Worlds (2007), Theory in the Field (2013), Neolithic Spaces (2020)

Sue Hamilton FSA is a British archaeologist and Professor of Prehistory at the UCL Institute of Archaeology. A material culture specialist and landscape archaeologist, she was the UCL Institute of Archaeology's first permanent female director (2014–22).

== Education ==
Educated at Ardingly College, Hamilton studied archaeology at school and at the University of Edinburgh before transferring to the (then) Institute of Archaeology, UCL, where she gained a BA in archaeology. She was awarded a PhD from the University of London in 1993 for her thesis on First Millennium BC Pottery Traditions in Southern Britain.

== Career ==
Prior to joining the Institute of Archaeology in 1990, Sue Hamilton taught archaeology at Birkbeck College and the Polytechnic of North London. Her early research focused on later British prehistory and pottery and she was a contributor to the UK Prehistoric Ceramics Research Group's, The Study of Later Prehistoric Pottery: Guidelines for Analysis and Publication (1991), which has been widely used by prehistoric pottery specialists ever since. Working alongside Christopher Tilley and Barbara Bender, from 1995 to 2000, she was co-director of the Bodmin Moor Landscapes Project (better known as the Leskernick Project), a seminal study in archaeological phenomenology, focusing on the moor's Neolithic and Bronze Age landscapes, and published in the book, Stone Worlds: Narrative and Reflexivity in Landscape Archaeology (2007). This work was followed, from 2002 to 2013, by the Tavoliere-Gargano Prehistory Project, which she co-directed with Ruth Whitehouse, and in which the principals of sensory archaeology, developed out of the Leskernick Project, were worked through in the context of the Neolithic villaggi trincerati (ditched villages) of southeast Italy. Her work on this project was published in a much referred to European Journal of Archaeology article, Phenomenology in Practice (2006), and in the book Neolithic Spaces (2020). Overlapping with the Tavoliere Project, from 2006 to 2015, she was co-director with Colin Richards, of the AHRC-funded Rapa Nui Landscapes of Construction Project, researching the archaeological and landscape contexts of Rapa Nui/ Easter Island's celebrated moai. In doing so, she and Professor Richards became "the first British archaeologists to work on the island since 1914." The Rapa Nui Landscapes of Construction Project is ongoing under her leadership.

After a distinguished career in research, teaching and university administration, Sue Hamilton became the first permanent female director of the UCL Institute of Archaeology on 1 September 2014.

== Bibliography (selected) ==
- Hamilton, Sue; Manley, John (2001). "Hillforts, Monumentality and Place: A chronological and topographic review of first millennium BC hillforts of south-east England." European Journal of Archaeology. 4 (1): 7–42. https://doi.org/10.1179%2Feja.2001.4.1.7
- Hamilton, Sue (2002). "Between ritual and routine: interpreting British prehistoric pottery production and distribution." In Woodward, Ann; Hill, J.D. (eds), Prehistoric Britain: The Ceramic Basis, 38–53. Oxford: Oxbow. ISBN 1-84217-071-6.
- Hamilton, Sue; Whitehouse, Ruth (2006). "Phenomenology in practice; towards a methodology for a subjective approach." European Journal of Archaeology. 9 (1): 31–71. https://doi.org/10.1177/1461957107077704
- Hamilton, Sue; Whitehouse, Ruth; Wright, Katherine, eds. (2006). Archaeology and Women: Ancient and Modern Issues. London: UCL Press. ISBN 978-1-84472-121-4 https://books.google.com/books?id=Rq8YDQAAQBAJ
- Bender, Barbara; Hamilton, Sue; Tilley, Christopher (2007). Stone Worlds: Narrative and Reflexive in Landscape Archaeology. Walnut Creek, CA: Left Coast Press. ISBN 978-1-59874-219-0 https://books.google.com/books?id=a6MYDQAAQBAJ
- Hamilton, Sue (2007). "Cultural choices in the ‘British Eastern Channel Area' in the Late Pre-Roman Iron Age." In Haselgrove, Colin; Moore, Tom (eds), The Later Iron Age in Britain and Beyond, 81–106. Oxford: Oxbow. ISBN 9781842172520.
- Hamilton, Sue; Seager Thomas, Mike; Whitehouse, Ruth (2011). "Say it with stone: constructing with stones on Easter Island." World Archaeology. 43 (2), 167–90. https://www.jstor.org/stable/41308493?seq=1
- Hamilton, Sue (2011). "The ambiguity of landscape: discussing points of relatedness in concepts and methods." In Cochrane, Ethan; Gardner, Andrew (eds), Evolutionary and Interpretive Archaeologies, 263–80. Walnut Creek: Left Coast Press.
- Hamilton, Sue; Barrett, John (2013). "Theory in the field." In Gardner, Andrew; Lake, Mark; Sommer, Ulrike (eds), Oxford Handbook of Archaeological Theory. Oxford: OUP. https://www.oxfordhandbooks.com/view/10.1093/oxfordhb/9780199567942.001.0001/oxfordhb-9780199567942-e-003
- Hamilton, Sue (2016). "Materialising island worlds." In Conrich, Ian; Mückler, Hermann (eds), Rapa Nui – Easter Island: Cultural and Historical Perspectives, 129–148. Berlin: Frank & Timme. https://archive.org/details/LOCHamiltonMaterialisingIslandWorlds2016
- Hamilton, Sue; Seager Thomas, Mike (2018). "Eroding heritage: an island context." Archaeology International. 21 (1), 64–74. https://discovery.ucl.ac.uk/id/eprint/10079011/8/Hamilton_Eroding%20Heritage.%20An%20Island%20Context_VoR.pdf
- Hamilton, Sue; Whitehouse, Ruth (2020). Neolithic Spaces, Volume 1: Social and Sensory Landscapes of the First Farmers of Italy. London: Accordia Research Institute. ISBN 978-1-87341-541-2
- Hamilton, Sue; Huke, Hetereki; Seager Thomas, Mike (2021). "Imagining Polynesia: heritage, identity and the evolution of a new Rapa Nui architecture." Journal of Contemporary Archaeology. 8 (1), 53–88. https://doi.org/10.1558/jca.43378
- Jordan, Pamela; Mura, Sara; Hamilton, Sue (2025). New Sensory Approaches to the Past: Applied Methods in Sensory Heritage and Archaeology. London: UCL Press. https://discovery.ucl.ac.uk/id/eprint/10210445/1/New-Sensory-Approaches-to-the-Past.pdf ISBN 9781800088689
