= Christopher Tilley =

British archaeologist (1955–2024)

- Tilley in 2008
- Born: 11 September 1955
- Died: 10 March 2024 (aged 68)

Academic background
- Education: University of Cambridge
- Doctoral advisor: Ian Hodder

Academic work
- Discipline: Archaeology
- Sub-discipline: Post-processual archaeology
- Institutions: University of Cambridge; University College London

Christopher Yates Tilley (11 September 1955 – 10 March 2024) was a British archaeologist known for his contributions to post-processual archaeological theory. He retired as emeritus Professor of Anthropology and Archaeology at University College London in 2022.

== Biography ==
Tilley was born on 11 September 1955.

He obtained his PhD in anthropology and archaeology at the University of Cambridge, where he was a student of Ian Hodder. In the early 1980s, Hodder and his students at Cambridge first developed postprocessualism, an approach to archaeology stressing the importance of interpretation and subjectivity, strongly influenced by the Neo-Marxist Frankfurt School. Tilley and his early collaborator Daniel Miller were amongst the most strongly relativist of first wave postprocessualist archaeologists, and was particularly critical of what he saw as the negative political implications of positivist processual archaeology. In the late 1980s and 1990s, Tilley moved away from the structuralist approach pursued by Hodder and, along with Michael Shanks and Peter Ucko, advocated a position of strong relativism. For Shanks and Tilley, academic interpretations of the archaeological record have no more legitimacy than any other, and they view claims to the contrary as elitist attempts to control the past, asserting that "there is no way of choosing between alternative pasts except on essentially political grounds."

In a 1989 paper of his published in the academic journal Antiquity, Tilley openly criticised the aims of rescue excavation, arguing that it was simply designed to collect "more and more information about the past", most of which would remain unpublished and of no use to either archaeologists or the public. As he related, "The number of pieces of information we collect about the past may increase incrementally – our understanding does not." Instead he argued that the archaeological community in the western nations should cease their constant accumulation of new data from rescue digs and instead focus on producing interpretive frameworks with which to interpret it, and also on publishing the backlog of data produced from decades of excavation.

Tilley is credited with introducing phenomenology into archaeology with his 1994 work A Phenomenology of Landscape. Phenomenology in archaeology entails the 'intuitive' study of material things, especially landscapes, in terms of their meanings to people in the past, and has been influential in both Britain and the United States. In the late 1990s, Tilley worked with Barbara Bender and Sue Hamilton to investigate the Bronze Age landscapes of Leskernick on Bodmin Moor, with a number of UCL students.

Tilley died on 10 March 2024, aged 68.

== Selected publications ==
- Tilley, Christopher (1990). Reading Material Culture: Structuralism, Hermeneutics and Post-Structuralism. Oxford: Basil Blackwell. ISBN 978-0-631-17285-7
- Tilley, Christopher (1991). Material Culture and Text: The Art of Ambiguity. London: Routledge.
- Tilley, Christopher (1994). A Phenomenology of Landscape: Places, Paths and Monuments. Oxford: Berg. ISBN 978-1-85973-076-8.
- Bender, Barbara; Hamilton, Sue, and Tilley, Christopher. (1997). Leskernick: Stone worlds, alternative narratives, nested landscapes. Proceedings of the Prehistoric Society 63: 147–178.
- Bender, Barbara; Hamilton, Sue, and Tilley, Christopher. (1999). Bronze Age stone worlds of Bodmin Moor: excavating Leskernick. Archaeology International 3: 13–17.
- Buchli (Ed.), Victor; Tilley, Christopher (2002). The Material Culture Reader. Oxford: Berg. ISBN 1-85973-559-2.
- Bender, Barbara; Hamilton, Sue, and Tilley, Christopher (2003). Art and re-presentation of the past. Journal of the Royal Anthropological Institute 6(1): 35–62.
- Tilley, Christopher (2004). The Materiality of Stone: Explorations in Landscape Phenomenology. Oxford: Berg. ISBN 978-1-85973-892-4.
- Bender, Barbara; Hamilton, Sue; Tilley, Christopher (2007). Stone Worlds: Narrative and Reflexivity in Landscape Archaeology. Walnut Creek CA: Left Coast Press. ISBN 978-1-59874-218-3.
- Tilley, Christopher; Keane, Webb; Küchler, Susanne; Rowlands, Mike; Spyer, Patricia (2013). Handbook of material culture. London: SAGE. ISBN 978-1446270561.
- Tilley, Christopher; Cameron-Daum, Kate (2017). An Anthropology of Landscape. London: UCL Press. ISBN 978-1-911307-43-3.
- Tilley, Christopher (2019). London's Urban Landscape: Another Way of Telling. London: UCL Press. ISBN 978-1787355590.

== See also ==
- Barbara Bender
- Sue Hamilton
