= Performance archaeology =

Subset of archaeological theory

Performance archaeology is a subset of archaeological theory. Developers of this theory include Michael Shanks, Mike Pearson and Julian Thomas who in the 1990s at University of Wales, Lampeter began formulating concepts which view the social aspect of performance along with the artistic nature of theatre together through an interdisciplinary lens as "an integrated approach to recording, writing and illustrating the material past" thereby marrying the academic with the artistic. Performance archaeology has further expanded in the last decade upon the theories of presence. Geoff Bailey states that "because we believe that the present is known or knowable better than the past, we must seek our inspiration in studies of present phenomena and our concepts and theories from authorities on the present." Michael Shanks along with Ian Hodder, Christopher Witmore, Gabriella Giannachi and Nick Kaye have recently expanded the theory further by calling for cooperation within the humanities and studying transdisciplinary research from archaeologists who are encouraged to become storytellers in order to more diversely analyze the engagement of the actor, the audience, the things and the space in which they perform by using an 'ecology of practices'. The theory of performance archaeology aims to give researchers a multi temporal link to the antiquated through studying the processual nature of "performance of presence" which is entangled within the 'multipleness' of time. Echoing theories posited by Martin Heidegger, the processual and temporal natures of performance are phenomenologically entwined with the experiences of the performers and audience. Stories are preserved by memory through performance. These performances can be seen both in the archaeological record as well in modern enactments or rituals. The landscape itself is an integral portion of performance memory. Performance archaeology sets itself apart from performance history by directing focus not toward the past itself but instead toward what has become of the past by taking an ethnoarchaeological approach of analyzing the 'archaeology of present' cultures which allows for a richer interpretation of past performance. Performance archaeology takes a cross-disciplinary approach with 'social archaeology' to studying the things, narratives or artifacts, that remain of ancient theatre, music, dance, art history and oral tradition in order to 'model the past'.

== See also ==
- Experimental archaeology
