= Archaeological culture =

Group of artifact types and structure layouts that often occur together

An archaeological culture is a recurring assemblage of types of artifacts, buildings, and monuments from a specific period and region that may constitute the material culture remains of a particular past human society. The connection between these types is an empirical observation. Their interpretation in terms of ethnic or political groups is based on archaeologists' understanding. However, this is often subject to long-unresolved debates. The concept of the archaeological culture is fundamental to culture-historical archaeology.

== Concept ==
Different cultural groups have material culture items that differ both functionally and aesthetically due to varying cultural and social practices. This notion is observably true on the broadest scales. For example, the equipment associated with the brewing of tea varies greatly across the world. Social relations to material culture often include notions of identity and status.

Advocates of culture-historical archaeology use the notion to argue that sets of material culture can be used to trace ancient groups of people that were either self-identifying societies or ethnic groups. Archaeological culture is a classifying device to order archaeological data, focused on artifacts as an expression of culture rather than people. The classic definition of this idea comes from Gordon Childe:

We find certain types of remains – pots, implements, ornaments, burial rites and house forms – constantly recurring together. Such a complex of associated traits we shall call a "cultural group" or just a "culture". We assume that such a complex is the material expression of what today we would call "a people".

— Childe 1929, pp. v–vi, The Danube in Prehistory, Preface

The concept of an archaeological culture was crucial to linking the typological analysis of archaeological evidence to mechanisms that attempted to explain why they change through time. The key explanations favoured by culture-historians were the diffusion of forms from one group to another or the migration of the peoples themselves. A simplistic example of the process might be that if one pottery-type had handles similar to those of a neighbouring type but decoration similar to a different neighbour, the idea for the two features might have diffused from the neighbours. Conversely, if one pottery type suddenly replaces a great diversity of pottery types in an entire region, that might be interpreted as a new group migrating in with this new style.

This idea of culture is known as normative culture. It relies on the assumption found in the view of archaeological culture that artifacts found are "an expression of cultural norms," and that these norms define culture. This view is also required to be polythetic; multiple artifacts must be found for a site to be classified under a specific archaeological culture. One trait alone does not result in a culture, a combination of traits is required.

This view culture gives life to the artifacts themselves. "Once 'cultures' are regarded as things, it is possible to attribute behavior to them, and to talk about them as if they were living organisms."

Archaeological cultures were equated with separate 'peoples' (ethnic groups or races), leading in some cases to distinct nationalist archaeologies.

Most archaeological cultures are named after either the type of artifact or the type site that defines the culture. For example, cultures may be named after pottery types such as Linear Pottery culture or Funnelbeaker culture. More frequently, they are named after the site at which the culture was first defined, such as the Hallstatt culture or Clovis culture.

Since the term "culture" has multiple different meanings, scholars have also coined a more specific term, paleoculture, as a specific designation for prehistoric cultures. Critics argue that cultural taxonomies lack a strong consensus on the epistemological aims of cultural taxonomy,

== Development ==
The use of the term "culture" entered archaeology through 19th-century German ethnography, where the Kultur of tribal groups and rural peasants was distinguished from the Zivilisation of urbanised peoples. In contrast to the broader use of the word that was introduced to English-language anthropology by Edward Burnett Tylor, Kultur was used by German ethnologists to describe the distinctive ways of life of a particular people or Volk, in this sense equivalent to the French civilisation. Works of Kulturgeschichte (culture history) were produced by a number of German scholars, particularly Gustav Klemm, from 1780 onwards, reflecting a growing interest in ethnicity in 19th-century Europe.

The first use of "culture" in an archaeological context was in Christian Thomsen's 1836 work Ledetraad til Nordisk Oldkyndighed (Danish: Guide to Northern Antiquity). In the latter half of the 19th century archaeologists in Scandinavia and central Europe increasingly made use of the German concept of culture to describe the different groups they distinguished in the archaeological record of particular sites and regions, often alongside and as a synonym of "civilisation". It was not until the 20th century and the works of German prehistorian and fervent nationalist Gustaf Kossinna that the idea of archaeological cultures became central to the discipline. Kossinna saw the archaeological record as a mosaic of clearly defined cultures (or Kultur-Gruppen, culture groups) that were strongly associated with race. He was particularly interested in reconstructing the movements of what he saw as the direct prehistoric ancestors of Germans, Slavs, Celts and other major Indo-European ethnic groups in order to trace the Aryan race to its homeland or Urheimat.

The strongly racist character of Kossinna's work meant it had little direct influence outside of Germany at the time (the Nazi Party enthusiastically embraced his theories), or at all after World War II. However, the more general "culture history" approach to archaeology that he began did replace social evolutionism as the dominant paradigm for much of the 20th century. Kossinna's basic concept of the archaeological culture, stripped of its racial aspects, was adopted by Vere Gordon Childe and Franz Boas, at the time the most influential archaeologists in Britain and America respectively. Childe, in particular, was responsible for formulating the definition of archaeological culture that still largely applies today. He defined archaeological culture as artifacts and remains that consistently occur together. This introduced a "new and discrete usage of the term which was significantly different from current anthropological usage." His definition, in particular, was purely a classifying device to order the archaeological data.

Though he was sceptical about identifying particular ethnicities in the archaeological record and inclined much more to diffusionism than migrationism to explain culture change, Childe and later culture-historical archaeologists, like Kossinna, still equated separate archaeological cultures with separate "peoples". Later archaeologists have questioned the straightforward relationship between material culture and human societies. The definition of archaeological cultures and their relationship to past people has become less clear; in some cases, what was believed to be a monolithic culture is shown by further study to be discrete societies. For example, the Windmill Hill culture now serves as a general label for several different groups that occupied southern Great Britain during the Neolithic. Conversely, some archaeologists have argued that some supposedly distinctive cultures are manifestations of a wider culture, but they show local differences based on environmental factors such as those related to Clactonian man. Conversely, archaeologists may make a distinction between material cultures that actually belonged to a single cultural group. It has been highlighted, for example, that village-dwelling and nomadic Bedouin Arabs have radically different material cultures even if in other respects, they are similar. In the past, such synchronous findings were often interpreted as representing intrusion by other groups.

== Criticism ==
The concept of archaeological cultures is itself a divisive subject within the archaeological field. When first developed, archaeological culture was viewed as a reflection of actual human culture.

...in the traditional view, we translate present into past by collecting artifacts into groups, and naming those groups as archaeological cultures. We then make the equation between an archaeological and a human culture by making the assumption that artifacts are the expressions of cultural ideas or norms. (...) This approach (...) was termed "culture history" by many (...).

— Matthew Johnson, Archaeological Theory: An Introduction, p. 19–20

This view of culture would be "entirely satisfactory if the aim of archaeology were solely the definition and description of these entities." However, as the 1960s rolled around and archaeology sought to be more scientific, archaeologists wanted to do more than just describe artifacts, and the archaeological culture found.

Accusations came that archaeological culture was "idealist" as it assumes that norms and ideas are seen as being "important in the definition of cultural identity." It stresses the particularity of cultures: "Why and how they are different from the adjacent group." Processualists, and others subsequently critical of cultural-historical archaeology argued that archaeological culture treated culture as "just a rag-tag assemblage of ideas."

Archaeological culture is presently useful for sorting and assembling artifacts, especially in European archaeology, which often falls towards culture-historical archaeology.

== See also ==
- Archaeological association
- Law of superposition – Law stating that newer strata stack above older ones
- Relative dating (archaeology) – Determination of the relative order of archaeological layers and artifacts
- Sequence (archaeology) – Stratigraphy of the archaeological record, used as part of the 'seriation' method of relative dating
- Seriation (archaeology) – Archaeological method of relative dating
- Sequence dating – Archaeological relative dating method based on linking pottery styles to time periods
- Stratigraphy (archaeology) – Study of archaeological sedimentation for dating purposes

== Sources ==
- Childe, V. Gordon (1929). The Danube in Prehistory. Oxford: Oxford University Press.
- Johnson, Matthew (2019). Archaeological Theory: An Introduction. Third Edition. Wiley-Blackwell. p. 400. ISBN 9781118475027.
- Marwick, Ben (15 October 2019). "Galisonian logic devices and data availability: revitalising Upper Palaeolithic cultural taxonomies". Antiquity. 93 (371): 1365–1367. doi:10.15184/aqy.2019.131. S2CID 211672039.
- McNairn, Barbara (1980). The Method and Theory of V. Gordon Childe. Edinburgh University Press. p. 48. ISBN 0852243898.
- Polomé, Edgar Charles (1982). Language, Society and Paleoculture. Stanford University Press. ISBN 9780804711494.
- Reynolds, Natasha; Riede, Felix (15 October 2019). "House of cards: cultural taxonomy and the study of the European Upper Palaeolithic". Antiquity. 93 (371): 1350–1358. doi:10.15184/aqy.2019.49.
- Scerri, Eleanor M.L. (15 October 2019). "Cultural taxonomy for the European Upper Palaeolithic: a wide-ranging problem". Antiquity. 93 (371): 1362–1364. doi:10.15184/aqy.2019.135. S2CID 211661048.
- Shea, John J. (15 October 2019). "European Upper Palaeolithic cultural taxa: better off without them?". Antiquity. 93 (371): 1359–1361. doi:10.15184/aqy.2019.117. S2CID 211663912.
- Shennan, S. J. (1978). Hodder, I. (ed.). Archaeological 'cultures: an empirical investigation. London: Duckworth.
- Trigger, Bruce G (1980). Gordon Childe, Revolutions in Archaeology. Thames and Hudson. ISBN 0-500-05034-1.
- Trigger, Bruce G. (2006). A history of archaeological thought (2nd ed.). Cambridge: Cambridge University Press. ISBN 978-0-521-60049-1.
