= Metamedia =

New relationships between form and content in the development of technologies and media

The term metamedia, coined by Alan Kay and Adele Goldberg, refers to new relationships between form and content in the development of new technologies and new media.

In the late 20th and early 21st centuries, the term was taken up by writers such as Douglas Rushkoff and Lev Manovich. Contemporary metamedia, such as at Stanford, has been expanded to describe, "a short circuit between the academy, the art studio and information science exploring media and their archaeological materiality." Metamedia utilizes new media and focuses on collaboration across traditional fields of study, melding everything from improvisational theatre and performance art, to agile, adaptive software development and smart mobs.

== Development ==
The new avant-garde is no longer concerned with seeing or representing the world in new ways but rather with accessing and using in new ways previously accumulated media. In this respect new media is post-media or meta-media, as it uses old media as its primary material.

— Lev Manovich

=== As an academic field of study ===
Stanford University Humanities Lab and MIT currently run research labs investigating metamedia. The MIT lab's mission is to provide a flexible online environment for creating and sharing rich media documents for learning on core humanities subjects. It is led by Kurt Fendt (co-Principal Investigator and Manager of the Metamedia project) and Henry Jenkins.

Stanford's lab is principally facilitated by Michael Shanks (archaeologist) with other collaborators, including Howard Rheingold, Fred Turner (academic), and Christopher Witmore. In its mission statement, it describes itself as a "creative studio and laboratory space for experimenting and taking risks...a democratic and collaborative assembly of archaeologists, anthropologists, classicists, communications experts, new media practitioners, performance artists, sociologists, software engineers, technoscientists, and anyone else who wants to join." A recent project is Life Squared (aka Life to the Second Power), an animated archive of the work of artist Lynn Hershman in the online world Second Life. Life Squared is one endeavor of The Presence Project, a live metamedia performance art project within the Metamedia lab.

== See also ==
- Meta
- Metatheory
- Metagraphy
