= Italian Renaissance =

Italian cultural movement from the 14th to 17th century

- 1350–1600
Middle Ages	Early modern period
- The Sistine Chapel ceiling, painted by Michelangelo between 1508 and 1512
- Location: Italian Peninsula
- Key events: Development of capitalism, banking, mercantilism and accounting; beginning of the European Great Divergence; Explorers from the Italian maritime republics serve under the auspices of European monarchs, ushering in the Age of Discovery; Rediscovery and restoration of humanism and of Greco-Roman culture; Italian Wars; Scientific Revolution

The Italian Renaissance (Italian: Rinascimento [rinaʃʃiˈmento], "rebirth") is a period in Italian history covering the 15th and 16th centuries, marking the transition from the Middle Ages to the early modern era. It was the initial phase of the broader Renaissance culture, which later spread to the rest of Europe—setting off the Northern Renaissance from the late 15th century—as well as to extra-European territories ruled by colonial powers or where Christian missionaries and traders were active. Proponents of a "long Renaissance" argue that it started around 1300 and lasted until about 1600, with a Proto-Renaissance accepted in some fields beginning around 1250. The term—derived from the French renaissance—defines the period as one of cultural revival and renewed interest in classical antiquity following what humanists labelled the "Dark Ages". The movement began in Tuscany, centered in the city of Florence. The Florentine Republic, one of several city-states on the peninsula, rose to economic and political prominence by providing credit to European monarchs and laying the groundwork for modern capitalism and banking. Renaissance culture later spread to Venice, Milan, Rome and the whole of Italy.

By the late 15th century, Italy had become the model culture for painting, architecture, sculpture, literature, music, philosophy, science, technology, and exploration. The period peaked in the mid-16th century as domestic disputes and foreign invasions plunged the region into the Italian Wars (1494–1559). Meanwhile, Italian explorers from the maritime republics sailed under European monarchs, ushering in the Age of Discovery: Christopher Columbus (for Spain) laid the foundation for European dominance of the Americas, alongside Giovanni da Verrazzano (for France), Amerigo Vespucci (for Portugal), and John Cabot (for England). In science, Italian figures such as Falloppio, Tartaglia, Galileo, and Torricelli played key roles in the Scientific Revolution, while foreigners like Copernicus and Vesalius worked at Italian universities. Historiographers have proposed various 17th-century events, such as the conclusion of the European wars of religion in 1648, as marking the end of the era.

== Origins and background ==
=== Northern and Central Italy in the Late Middle Ages ===
In northern Italy, feudal lordships and principalities began to emerge during the 14th century. The resulting signorie differed considerably from one another in terms of when they were established, their extent, their legal character, and their duration. City-states such as Venice and Genoa continued to maintain their status as republics. The use of professional mercenary armies repeatedly led to conflicts, enabling some states to expand while smaller powers were reduced to the status of vassals of their larger neighbors. At the same time, the Habsburgs managed to gain a foothold south of the Alps, while the influence and territorial ambitions of France and the Holy Roman Empire were temporarily curtailed by the end of this era. The structure of these new territorial states remained fragile; their survival depended on the skill and resources of their rulers.

Southern Italy in the 14th century was marked by ongoing conflict between the mainland Kingdom of Naples (House of Anjou) and the island Kingdom of Sicily (House of Aragon). The Angevins’ repeated attempts to recapture the island by military force ultimately failed and resulted in immense financial and economic losses for both sides. In contrast to the mainland, which suffered from weak leadership and the chaos of succession wars after 1343, Sicily began to recover toward the end of the 14th century. The assumption of direct rule by the royal House of Aragon-Catalonia ended the dynastic vacuum, stabilized the political order, and laid the foundation for the island’s economic recovery.

=== Thirteenth century ===
In the 13th century, much of Europe experienced strong economic growth. The trade routes of the Italian states linked with those of established Mediterranean ports and eventually the Hanseatic League of the Baltic and northern regions of Europe to create a network economy in Europe for the first time since the 4th century. The Italian city-states expanded greatly during this period and grew in power to become de facto fully independent of the Holy Roman Empire; and apart from the Kingdom of Naples, outside powers kept their armies out of Italy. In the previous centuries, since Christians had not been allowed to lend money nor the Jews to farm, the Jewish communities had developed a modern commercial infrastructure, with double-entry book-keeping, joint stock companies, an international banking system, systematized foreign exchange market, insurance, government debt. In this period, Italian bankers began to rival the previous dominant role of the Jewish communities on financial services. Cities such as Siena and Florence became centers of this financial industry, and the gold florin eventually became the main currency of international trade.

=== Fourteenth-century collapse ===
The 14th century saw a series of catastrophes that caused the European economy to go into recession. The Medieval Warm Period was ending as climate change began the Little Ice Age. A colder climate saw agricultural output decline significantly, leading to repeated famines, exacerbated by the rapid population growth of the prior era. The Hundred Years' War between England and France disrupted trade throughout northwest Europe, most notably when, in 1345, King Edward III of England repudiated his debts, contributing to the collapse of the two largest Florentine banks, those of the Bardi and Peruzzi.

The most devastating was the Black Death that decimated the populations of the densely populated cities of Northern Italy and returned at intervals thereafter. Florence, for instance, which had a pre-plague population of roughly 100,000 had dropped to some 40,000 by 1427. The resulting labour shortage caused an increase of wages. Due to population decline, a shift in the trade balance, and the growth of local industries, capital began to concentrate particularly heavily in cities in northern and central Italy, such as those in Tuscany. Since this wealth in Italy consisted not only of real estate but also, to a large extent, of liquid assets (money, commercial capital), it generated great purchasing power.

One of the greatest achievements of Italian Renaissance scholars was to bring this entire class of Greek cultural works back into Western Europe for the first time since late antiquity. Another popular explanation for the Italian Renaissance is the thesis, first advanced by historian Hans Baron, claims that the primary impetus of the early Renaissance was the long-running series of wars between Florence and Milan. By the late 14th century, Milan had become a centralized monarchy under the control of the Visconti family. Giangaleazzo Visconti, who ruled the city from 1378 to 1402, was renowned both for his cruelty and for his abilities, and set about building an empire in Northern Italy. He launched a long series of wars, with Milan steadily conquering neighbouring states and defeating the various coalitions led by Florence that sought in vain to halt the advance. This culminated in the 1402 siege of Florence when it looked as though the city was doomed to fall, before Giangaleazzo suddenly died and his empire collapsed.

== Development ==
=== International relationships ===
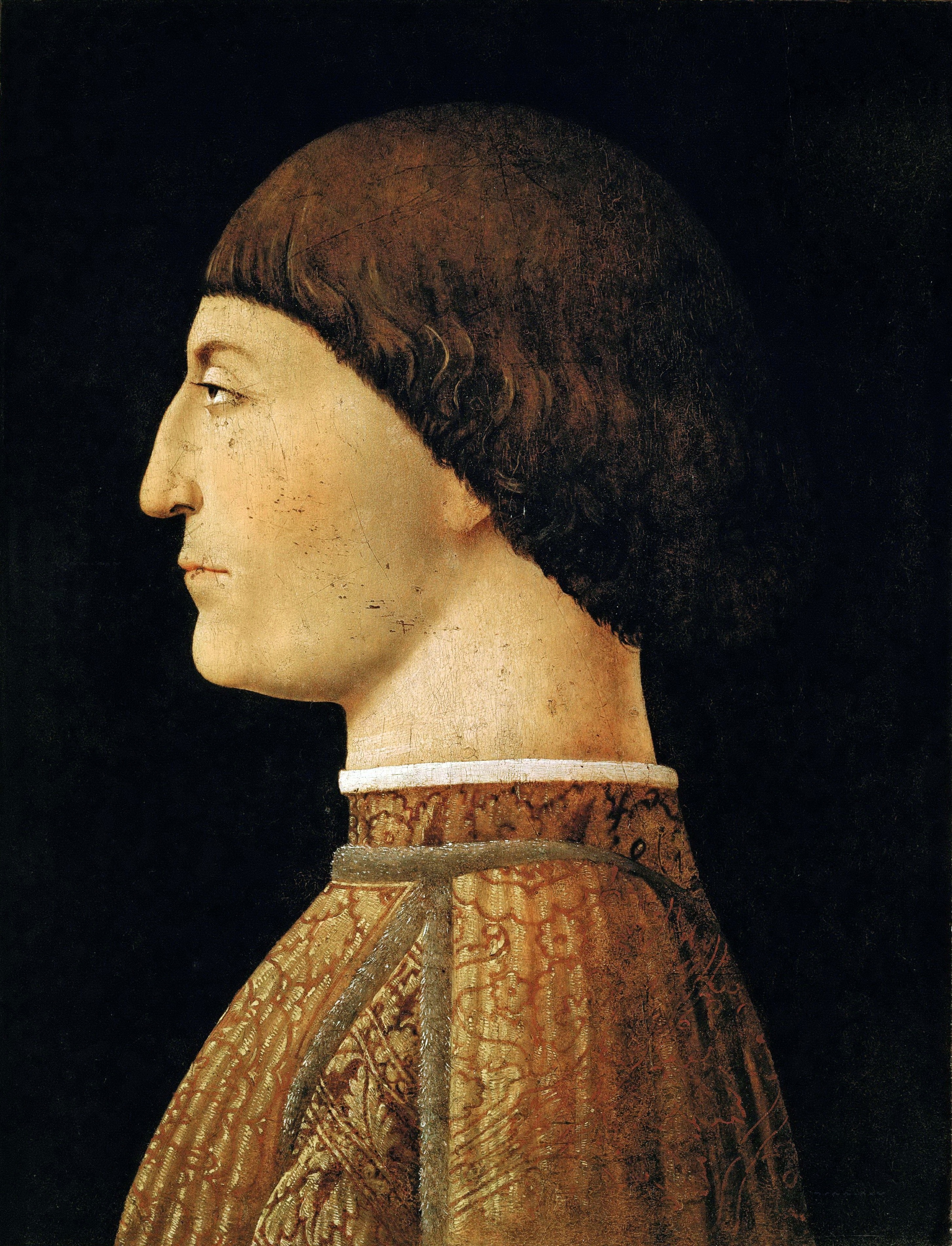
Pandolfo Malatesta (1417–1468), lord of Rimini, by Piero della Francesca. Malatesta was a capable condottiere, following the tradition of his family. He was hired by the Venetians to fight against the Turks (unsuccessfully) in 1465, and was the patron of Leone Battista Alberti, whose Tempio Malatestiano at Rimini is one of the first entirely classical buildings of the Renaissance.

Northern Italy and upper Central Italy were divided into a number of warring city-states, the most powerful being Milan, Florence, Pisa, Siena, Genoa, Ferrara, Mantua, Verona and Venice. Northern Italy was further divided by the long-running battle for supremacy between the forces of the Papacy and of the Holy Roman Empire Warfare between the states was common, interrupted by invasions of foreign powers. Renaissance politics developed from this background. Since the 13th century, as armies became primarily composed of mercenaries, prosperous city-states could field considerable forces, despite their low populations. In the course of the 15th century, the most powerful city-states annexed their smaller neighbours. Florence took Pisa in 1406, Venice captured Padua and Verona, while the Duchy of Milan annexed a number of nearby areas including Pavia and Parma.

The first part of the Renaissance saw almost constant warfare on land and sea as the city-states vied for preeminence. On land, these wars were primarily fought by armies of mercenaries known as condottieri, bands of soldiers drawn from around Europe, led largely by Italian captains. The mercenaries were not willing to risk their lives unduly, and war became one largely of sieges and manoeuvring, occasioning few pitched battles. It was also in the interest of mercenaries on both sides to prolong any conflict, to continue their employment. Mercenaries were also a constant threat to their employers; if not paid, they often turned on their patron. If it became obvious that a state was entirely dependent on mercenaries, the temptation was great for the mercenaries to take over the running of it themselves—this occurred on a number of occasions. Neutrality was maintained with France, which found itself surrounded by enemies when Spain disputed Charles VIII's claim to the Kingdom of Naples. Peace with France ended when Charles VIII invaded Italy to take Naples.

=== Florence under the Medici ===
Until the late 14th century, prior to the Medici, Florence's leading family were the House of Albizzi. In 1293 the Ordinances of Justice were enacted which effectively became the constitution of the Republic of Florence throughout the Italian Renaissance. The city's numerous luxurious palazzi were becoming surrounded by townhouses, built by the ever prospering merchant class. In 1298, one of the leading banking families of Europe, the Bonsignoris, were bankrupted and so the city of Siena lost her status as the banking center of Europe to Florence.

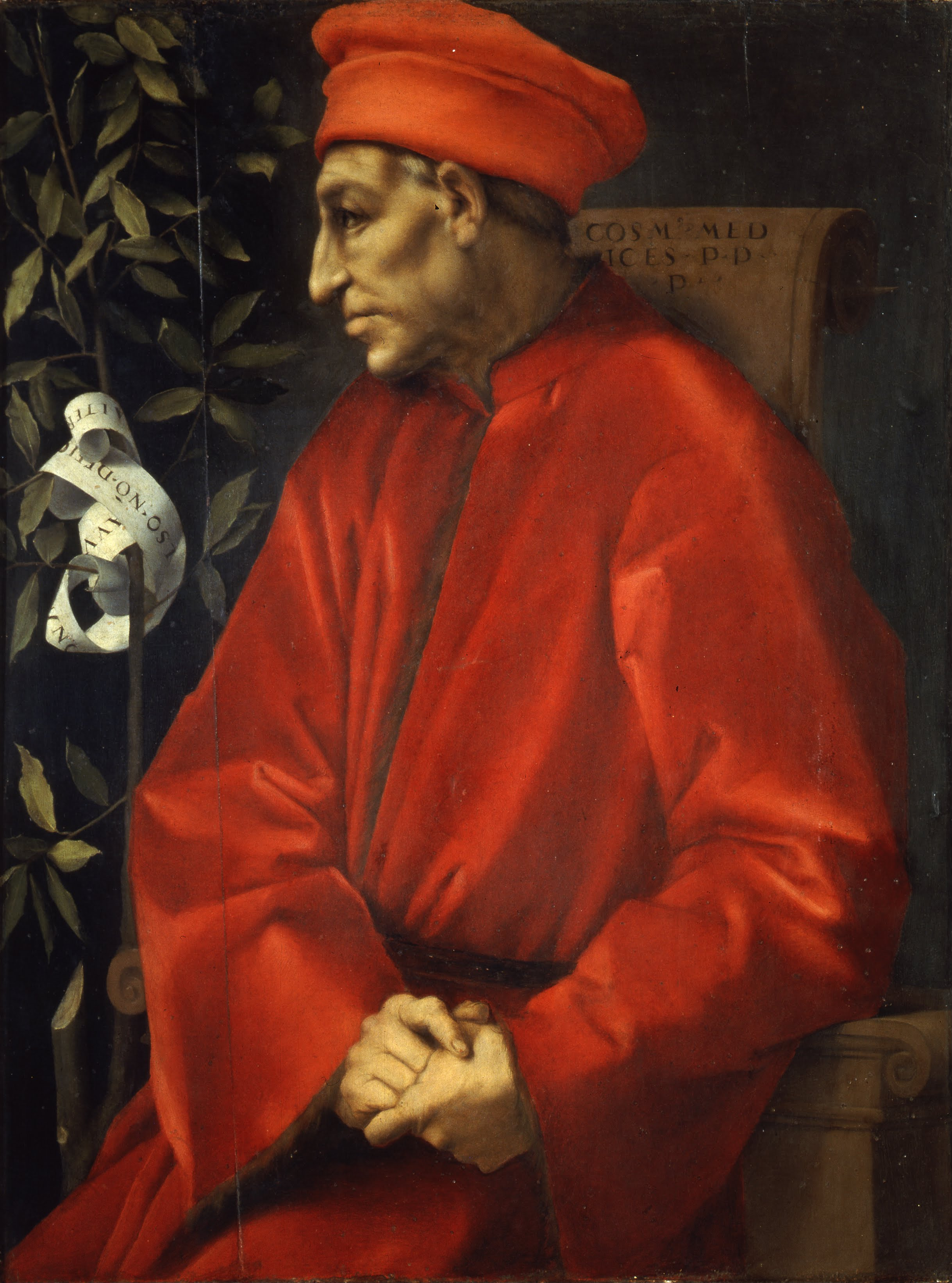
Portrait of Cosimo de' Medici by Jacopo Pontormo (c. 1518–1520)

The main challengers of the Albizzi family were the Medicis, first under Giovanni de' Medici, and later under his son Cosimo de' Medici. The Medici controlled the Medici bank—then Europe's largest bank—and an array of other enterprises in Florence and elsewhere. In 1433, the Albizzi managed to have Cosimo exiled. The next year, however, saw a pro-Medici Signoria elected and Cosimo returned. The Medici became the town's leading family, a position they would hold for the next three centuries. Florence organized the trade routes for commodities between England and the Netherlands, France, and Italy. By the middle of the century, the city had become the banking capital of Europe and thereby obtained vast riches.In 1439, Byzantine Emperor John VIII Palaiologos attended a council in Florence in an attempt to unify the Eastern and Western Churches. This brought books and, especially after the fall of the Byzantine Empire in 1453, an influx of scholars to the city. Ancient Greece began to be studied with renewed interest, especially the Neoplatonic school of thought, which was the subject of an academy established by the Medici.

Florence remained a republic until 1532 (see Duchy of Florence), traditionally marking the end of the High Renaissance in Florence, but the instruments of republican government were firmly under the control of the Medici and their allies, save during the intervals after 1494 and 1527. Cosimo and Lorenzo de' Medici rarely held official posts but were the unquestioned leaders. Cosimo was highly popular among the citizenry, mainly for bringing an era of stability and prosperity to the town. One of his most important accomplishments was negotiating the Peace of Lodi with Francesco Sforza ending the decades of war with Milan and bringing stability to much of Northern Italy.

Cosimo was succeeded by his sickly son Piero de' Medici, who died after five years in charge of the city. In 1469 the reins of power passed to Cosimo's 21-year-old grandson Lorenzo, who would become known as "Lorenzo the Magnificent." Lorenzo was the first of the family to be educated from an early age in the humanist tradition and is best known as one of the Renaissance's most important patrons of the arts. Lorenzo reformed Florence's ruling council from 100 members to 70, formalizing the Medici rule. The republican institutions continued, but they lost all power. Lorenzo was less successful than his illustrious forebears in business, and the Medici commercial empire was slowly eroded. Lorenzo continued the alliance with Milan, but relations with the papacy soured, and in 1478, Papal agents allied with the Pazzi family in an attempt to assassinate Lorenzo. Although the Pazzi conspiracy failed, Lorenzo's young brother, Giuliano, was killed at Easter Sunday mass in the city's cathedral. The failed assassination led to a war with the Papacy and was used as justification to further centralize power in Lorenzo's hands.

=== Spread ===
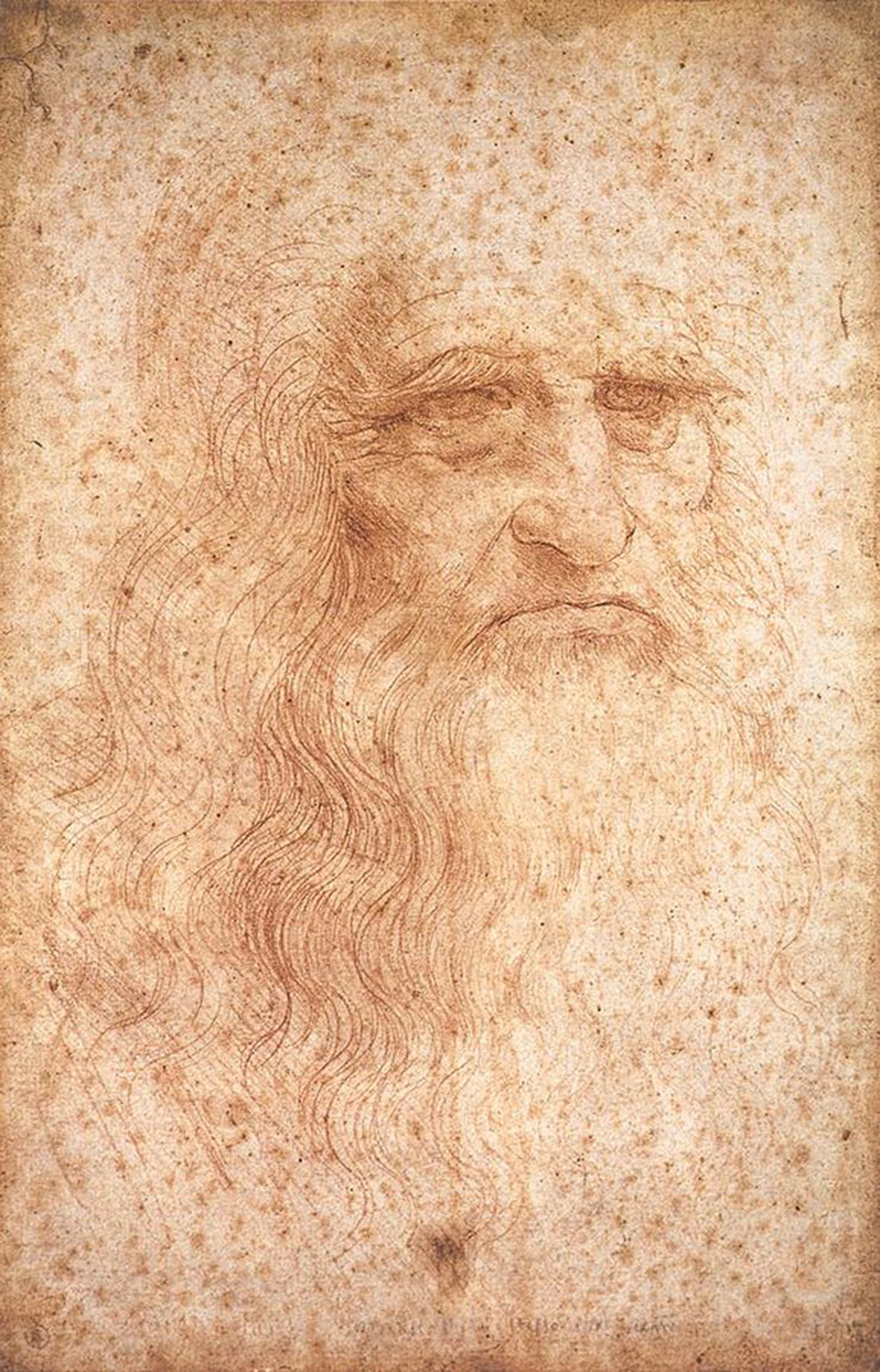
Leonardo da Vinci, Italian Renaissance Man, 1512

The Renaissance first took hold in Florence and, from there, spread to Pisa and Lucca beginning in 1406 and to Livorno in 1421. With the Pope’s return to Rome in 1420, a second center of the Renaissance began to take shape that eventually replaced Florence as the focal point. In 1447 Francesco Sforza came to power in Milan and rapidly transformed that still medieval city into a major center of art and learning. Venice, one of the wealthiest cities due to its control of the Adriatic Sea, also became a center for Renaissance culture, especially Venetian Renaissance architecture. In Naples, the Renaissance began under the patronage of Alfonso I, who conquered Naples in 1443. During his reign several artists, writers and humanists worked there including Francesco Laurana Fazio, Lorenzo and, Bartolomeo Valla, Antonio Beccadelli (Panormita) Giovanni Pontano and many more.

The nature of the Renaissance also changed in the late 15th century. The Renaissance ideal was fully adopted by the ruling classes and the aristocracy. In the early Renaissance artists were seen as craftsmen with little prestige or recognition. By the later Renaissance, the top figures wielded great influence and could charge great fees. A flourishing trade in Renaissance art developed. While in the early Renaissance many of the leading artists were of lower- or middle-class origins, increasingly they became aristocrats.

=== Wider population ===
As a cultural movement, the Italian Renaissance affected only a small part of the population. Italy was the most urbanized region of Europe, but three-quarters of the people were still rural peasants. For this section of the population, life remained essentially unchanged from the Middle Ages. Classic feudalism had never been prominent in Northern Italy, and most peasants worked on private farms or as sharecroppers. Some scholars see a trend towards refeudalization in the later Renaissance as the urban elites turned themselves into landed aristocrats.

The situation differed in the cities. These were dominated by a commercial elite; as exclusive as the aristocracy of any medieval kingdom. This group became the main patrons of and audience for Renaissance culture. Below them, there was a large class of artisans and guild members who lived comfortable lives and had significant power in the republican governments. This was in sharp contrast to the rest of Europe where artisans were firmly in the lower class. Literate and educated, this group participated in the Renaissance culture. The largest section of the urban population was the urban poor of semi-skilled workers and the unemployed. Like the peasants, the Renaissance had little effect on them. Historians debate how easy it was to move between these groups during the Italian Renaissance. Examples of individuals who rose from humble beginnings can be instanced, but Burke notes two major studies in this area that have found that the data do not clearly demonstrate an increase in social mobility. Most historians feel that early in the Renaissance social mobility was quite high, but that it faded over the course of the 15th century.

The Renaissance was not a period of great social or economic change, only of cultural and ideological development. It only touched a small fraction of the population, and in modern times this has led many historians, such as any that follow historical materialism, to reduce the importance of the Renaissance in human history. These historians tend to think in terms of "Early Modern Europe" instead. Roger Osborne argues that "The Renaissance is a difficult concept for historians because the history of Europe quite suddenly turns into a history of Italian painting, sculpture and architecture."

=== The waning of the Renaissance in Italy ===
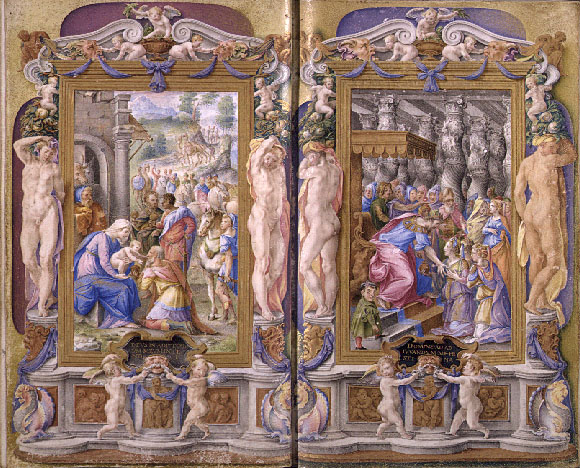
Giulio Clovio, Adoration of the Magi and Solomon Adored by the Queen of Sheba from the Farnese Hours, 1546

The end of the Italian Renaissance is as imprecisely marked as its starting point. For many, the rise to power in Florence of the austere monk Girolamo Savonarola in 1494–1498 marks the end of the city's flourishing; for others, the triumphant return of the Medici family to power in 1512 marks the beginning of the late phase in the Renaissance arts called Mannerism. Other accounts trace the end of the Italian Renaissance to the French invasions of the early 16th century and the subsequent conflict between France and Spanish rulers for control of Italian territory. Savonarola rode to power on a widespread backlash over the secularism and indulgence of the Renaissance. His brief rule saw many works of art destroyed in the "Bonfire of the Vanities" in the center of Florence. Following the Reformation the Papacy set their counter-reformation in motion. In 1542 the Sacred Congregation of the Inquisition was formed and in 1557 the Index Librorum Prohibitorum banned a wide array of Renaissance works of literature.

Equally important was the end of stability with a series of foreign invasions of Italy known as the Italian Wars that would continue for several decades. These began with the 1494 invasion by France that wreaked widespread devastation on Northern Italy and ended the independence of many of the city-states. Most damaging was the 6 May 1527, Spanish and German troops' sacking Rome that for two decades all but ended the role of the Papacy as the largest patron of Renaissance art and architecture

== Culture ==
=== Literature and poetry ===
Interest in the ancient world began in Italy as early as the Middle Ages (partly as a result of the Carolingian Renaissance and the 12th-century Renaissance), with the focus on classical culture, philology and the compatibility of ancient authors with Christian orthodoxy. Francesco Petrarca (1304–1374) stands at the centre of the revival of classical values such as civic virtue and personal glory. He advocated reading ancient texts directly, without medieval commentaries, as guides for modern life and as models for clear rhetoric. Petrarch combined classical thought with Christian orthodoxy, as well as secular life with the medieval concept of the transience of earthly endeavours. Because of the anxiety and ambivalence evident in his works regarding the reconciliation of the secular with the spiritual, he is often described as the first modern man.

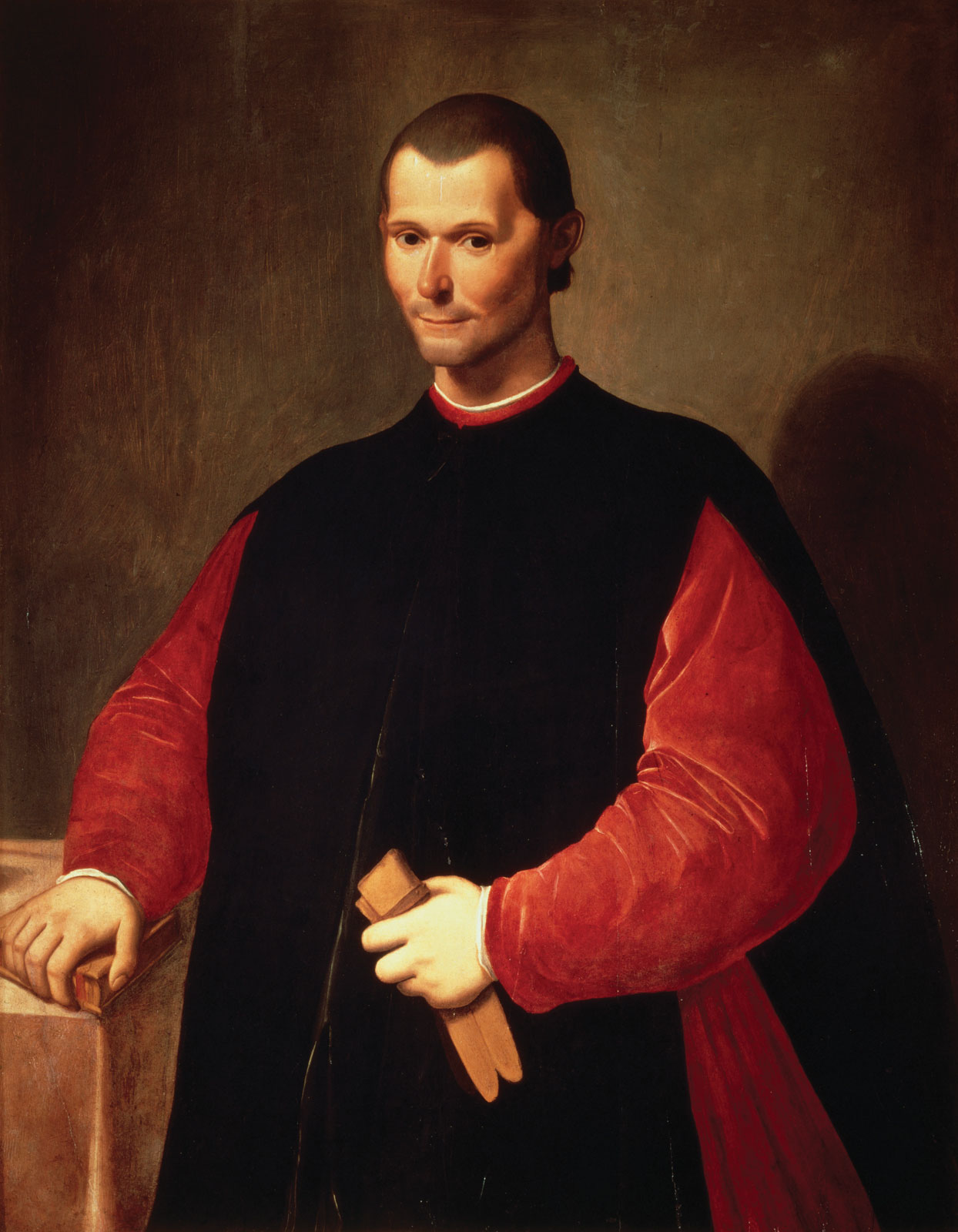
Niccolò Machiavelli (1469–1527), the author of The Prince and prototypical Renaissance man

Although accounts of Italian Renaissance literature usually begin with Petrarch as the first key figure, Dante and Boccaccio are also recognised for their contribution to the development of the early modern period. With his treatise De vulgari eloquentia (1303–c. 1304) laid the foundations for the so-called questione della lingua (language question) that is, the question of how to write most effectively and appropriately in the vernacular.

Boccaccio shaped the Renaissance in several ways: alongside Latin, he promoted the study of Greek;he introduced new literary genres (including the romanzo or verse romance, as well as pastoral tales); and, with the ottava rima (stanza), he developed the fundamental stanzaic form for narrative poetry. Furthermore, in the 16th century, Pietro Bembo (in Prose della volgar lingua, 1525) declared him to be the pre-eminent model for prose written in the vernacular.

The early Renaissance was shaped by intellectuals in academic circles and government who supported a philosophy of humanism. This defined human beings as rational beings with almost unlimited potential, as well as social beings with social responsibilities. Giovanni Pico della Mirandola (1463–1494) celebrated human potential in his treatise De hominis dignitate (On the Dignity of Man), whilst Leon Battista Alberti (1404–1472) addressed the civic and social responsibilities of the individual in his treatise Della famiglia (On the Family).

The writings of the 15th-century humanists were based on philosophical traditions, in particular Aristotelianism, Platonism and medieval patristic literature. Concepts drawn from medieval theological thought were also significant, with saints such as Augustine and other key figures of Christianity remaining prominent in the texts of the 15th century. Many writings of that period addressed difficult issues such as free will and predestination, as well as the inner conflict between worldly temptations and responsibility for one’s own spiritual well-being.

Whilst the first half of the century thus gave rise to abstract and pragmatic humanism, the later phase was characterised by philosophical writings accompanied by a wealth of literary works in prose and, in particular, poetry. Among the leading figures of the late 15th and early 16th centuries were Raphael (Raffaello Sanzio), Michelangelo, Ludovico Ariosto, Niccolò Machiavelli and Baldassare Castiglione. In many respects, these artists and writers represent the full flowering of humanist culture. In some cases, they already foreshadow the moral dilemma, the lack of certainties and the resulting anxiety that characterised the waning years of the Renaissance in Italy.

In the 16th century, the debate over the appropriate dialect or the correct vernacular for literature reached its peak. At its heart, the debate pitted those who defended Tuscan Italian as the most appropriate form for writing in the vernacular against those who favoured a literary Italian that more closely reflected the regional characteristics of the author’s native language. The keen interest in this debate was reflected, amongst other things, in the founding of the Accademia della Crusca (around 1582), whose original purpose was to guarantee the pure Tuscan character of the Italian used for formal writing.

=== Science and technology ===
The social and political changes, together with the rediscovery of ancient writings, also had an impact on science. Far-reaching developments and breakthroughs occurred particularly in anatomy, mathematics, physics, astronomy and engineering.

==== Anatomy ====
Influenced by Galen and his principle of autopsia (seeing with one’s own eyes), significant works on the human body were produced.For example, Bartolomeo Eustachi who is considered, among others, the founder of modern anatomy described in his Opuscula anatomica the Eustachian tube and valve, the adrenal gland, the thoracic duct, the uterus, the kidneys, and the cardiovascular system. Gabriele Falloppio gathered further anatomical knowledge. In his work Observationes anatomicae, he described, among other things, the fallopian tubes (which he compared to small trumpets), the sphenoid sinus, the nervous systems, and the middle and inner ear.

The brain, as the seat of the mind, was also studied in detail. Arcangelo Piccolomini made a significant contribution to distinguishing between the cerebrum and the medulla; Giulio Cesare Aranzio gave the hippocampus its name; and Costanzo Varolio was the first to describe the cortex the outer layer of the brain as a kind of protective bark (cork). Leonardo da Vinci also contributed to the understanding of the human body through his anatomical drawings. Although he repeated traditional errors (such as the traditional five-lobed liver or the localization of mental faculties in the cerebral ventricles, as described in Galenic and medieval texts), he depicted body parts such as the hand, foot, shoulder, head, and internal organs with increasing naturalism and richness of detail.

==== Physics and Astronomy ====
In physics and astronomy, Galileo Galilei distinguished himself through his experiments on free fall, his improvements to the telescope, and the resulting observations. He demonstrated the existence of mountains and valleys on the Moon, discovered four moons of Jupiter, and showed that the Milky Way consists of a collection of individual stars. His discoveries and experiments refuted both the Aristotelian doctrine of the perfection and homogeneity of the heavens and his assertion that heavier bodies fall faster than lighter ones. Because of the theses presented in his magnum opus, Dialogo sopra i due massimi sistemi del mondo (1632), in which he advocated the Copernican view of the world, he was put on trial in Rome in 1633, sentenced to lifelong house arrest, and his Dialogo was placed on the Index of Prohibited Books. Alongside Galileo, Giordano Bruno made a further contribution to the explanation of the universe with his doctrine of infinite worlds and his thesis that the Sun is a star like all the others in the night sky.

==== Mathematics ====
Major developments in mathematics include the spread of algebra throughout Europe, especially Italy. Luca Pacioli published a book on mathematics at the end of the fifteenth century, in which he first published positive and negative signs. Symbolic algebra was established by the French mathematician François Viete in the 16th century. He published "Introduction to Analytical Methods" in 1591, systematically sorting out algebra, and for the first time consciously using letters to represent unknown and known numbers. In his other book "On the Recognition and Correction of Equations", Viete improved the solution of the third-degree and fourth-degree equations, and also established the relationship between the roots and coefficients of quadratic and cubic equations, which is called "Viete's formulas" now. Trigonometry also achieved greater development during the Renaissance. The German mathematician Regiomontanus's De triangulis omnimodis was Europe's first trigonometric work independent of astronomy.

=== Painting and sculpture ===
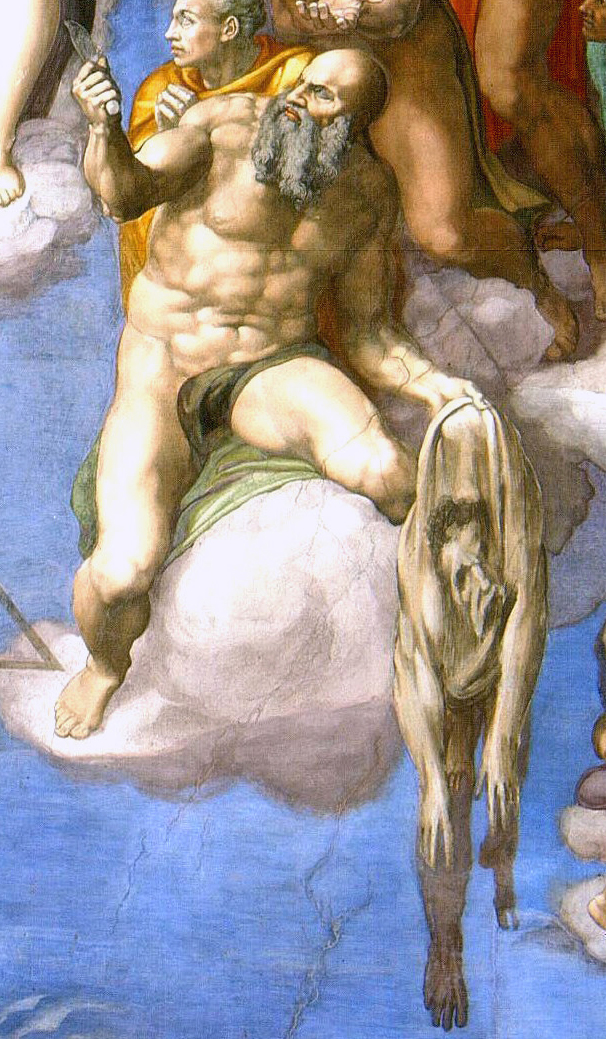
Detail of The Last Judgment by Michelangelo, 1536–1541

Renaissance painting in Italy saw its beginning with the rejection of the Maniera greca, characterized by its golden backgrounds, vibrant colors, striations used to depict fabric folds, and segmented lines used to render the anatomical details of the figures. The first who broke with this tradition was the late medieval painter Giotto di Bondone. He was the first to give his figures true volume, thereby creating a sense of spatial depth. Through the deliberate use of light and shadow, his figures appeared three-dimensional. He also gave them individual faces and genuine emotions. In doing so, he set himself apart from earlier artists and created a closer connection between the image and visible reality.

A century later, Masaccio was the first to take the decisive step toward the Quattrocento by adapting the concepts and ideas of Giotto, Donatello, and Brunelleschi for his paintings. In doing so, he created the sense of spatial depth and three-dimensionality that characterizes the Renaissance. The Holy Trinity fresco in the Florentine church of Santa Maria Novella, for example, looks as if it is receding at a dramatic angle into the dark background, while single-source lighting and foreshortening appear to push the figure of Christ into the viewer's space.

While mathematical precision and classical idealism fascinated painters in Rome and Florence, many Northern artists in the regions of Venice, Milan and Parma preferred landscape paintings.Especially artists such as Giorgione, Tintoretto, and Titian, stood out most prominent on the emphasis of colorito, disegno and chiaroscuro.

The period also saw the first secular (non-religious) themes. There has been much debate as to the degree of secularism in the Renaissance, which had been emphasized by early 20th-century writers like Jacob Burckhardt based on, among other things, the presence of a relatively small number of mythological paintings. Those of Botticelli, notably The Birth of Venus and Primavera, are now among the best known, although he was deeply religious (becoming a follower of Savonarola) and the great majority of his output was of traditional religious paintings or portraits.

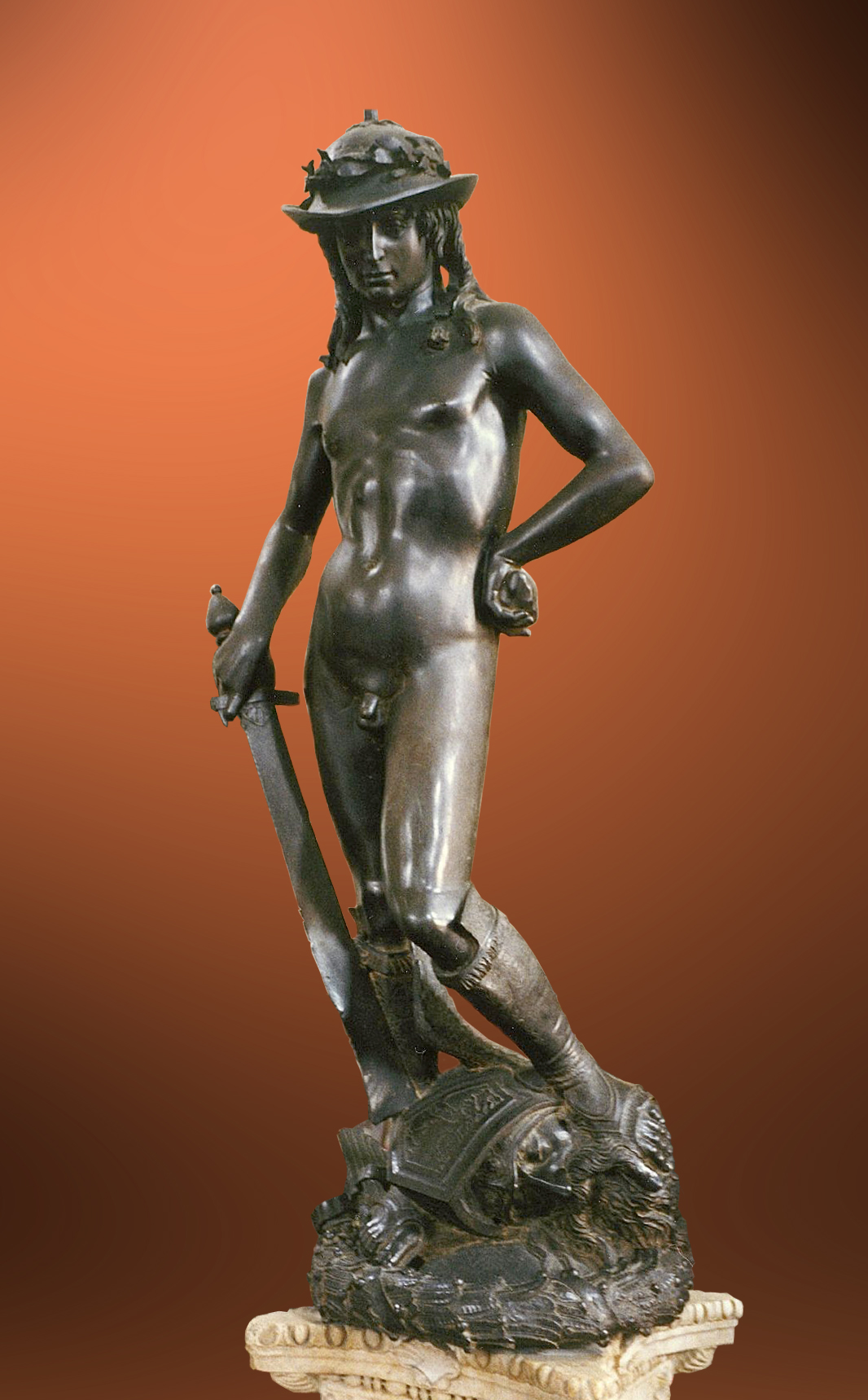
David by Donatello, 1440s

In sculpture, the Florentine artist Donato di Niccolò di Betto Bardi, or Donatello, was among the earliest sculptors to translate classical references into marble and bronze. His second sculpture of David was the first free-standing bronze nude created in Europe since the Roman Empire. He also contributed to the further development of relief sculpture through the introduction of the Rilievo Schiacciato.

The period known as the High Renaissance of painting saw the culmination of the varied means of expression and various advances in painting techniques developed in previous periods, such as linear perspective, the realistic depiction and the manipulation of light and darkness, including tone contrast, sfumato and chiaroscuro, which expressed total compositional order, balance and harmony. In particular, the individual parts of the painting had a complex but balanced and well-knit relationship to the whole. The most famous painters from this phase are Leonardo da Vinci, Raphael, and Michelangelo and their images, The Last Supper and Mona Lisa,The School of Athens and the Sistine Chapel Ceiling.

=== Architecture ===
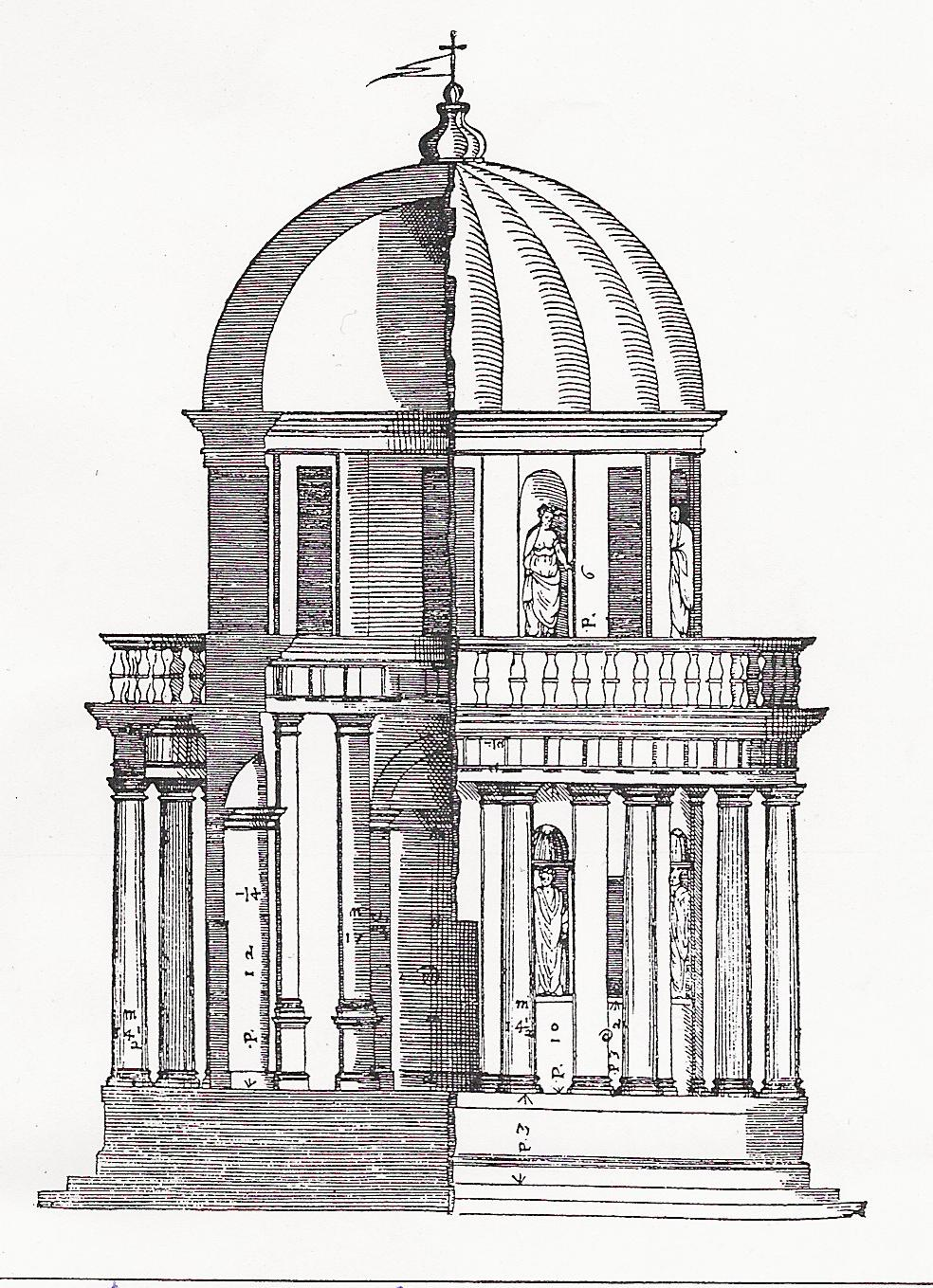
Bramante's Tempietto in San Pietro in Montorio, Rome, 1502

Although Renaissance architecture is generally regarded and was also seen by its architects at the time as a rebirth of antiquity, a direct comparison (for example, between Roman temples and Renaissance central-plan buildings such as St Peter’s Basilica) shows that the architectural similarities are often minimal. Thus, whilst an ancient stylistic vocabulary (column arrangements, Roman vaults, coffered ceilings, decorative elements) did indeed replace Gothic architecture in the 15th century, there were no ancient models that could be directly applied to churches, municipal or private buildings, which is why the forms had to be significantly adapted. A defining example is Leon Battista Alberti’s rhythmic alternation of narrow wall sections and wide openings, as seen in Sant’Andrea in Mantua, which Bramante later adopted in the Vatican, thereby exerting a decisive influence on subsequent Renaissance architecture.

Beyond ancient influences, Renaissance architecture drew heavily on late antique, medieval and Byzantine motifs, rather than breaking completely with these periods: the arrangement of arches on columns, introduced by Brunelleschi, originated in early Christian basilicas and their late antique precursors. Centralised buildings in northern Italy with multi-storey external galleries, such as Santa Maria della Croce in Crema, continued the tradition of medieval baptisteries. In the same way , Lombard domes with gallery cladding (such as Bramante’s dome at Santa Maria delle Grazie in Milan) followed Romanesque traditions. Early Florentine palace architecture was merely a further development of the medieval rusticated façade. Despite more classical innovations such as the Palazzo Rucellai (1446), this style remained dominant for a long time (including the Palazzo Strozzi and the Palazzo dei Diamanti). In Venice, by contrast, traditional medieval palace façades were simply overlaid with a layer of classical forms (e.g. by Mauro Codussi).

Also, the most distinctive vault forms, floor plans and colour schemes of the Renaissance go back to Byzantine and medieval Gothic origins, rather than to ancient Rome: The high dome characteristic of the Renaissance, supported by pendentives to bridge the transition from the square crossing plan to the round dome, originated in Byzantium and reached Italy via Venice. The floor plan in the form of a Greek cross (a dominant central dome on tall pillars, four arms of equal length, and four subsidiary domes at the diagonals) is also of Byzantine origin. It was revived in Venice and adapted into a nave-and-transverse-aisle layout by arranging three such units in a row. Bramante also combined this Byzantine cross-plan in St Peter’s Basilica with massive pillars modelled on the Basilica of San Lorenzo Maggiore in Milan.

For colour schemes, architects such as Brunelleschi drew on the tradition of Florentine Gothic, a principle followed by countless Renaissance architects, including Giuliano da Sangallo, Alberti and Michelangelo Influenced by the biblical view of humanity (the image of God) and Neoplatonism (human proportions as a reflection of universal harmony), the human form was regarded as the standard for architecture. A building was intended to function like a human body, in which all individual parts are in harmonious proportion to one another and to the whole. The classical columnar order (base, shaft, capital, entablature) was modelled directly on the proportions of the human body.

During the 15th century, Vitruvius’s influence grew rapidly, to the extent that by 1500, knowledge of and interpretation of his work had become a prerequisite for every architect. This is evident in numerous projects by leading masters, including Italian translations by Raphael and Antonio da Sangallo, or the first illustrated Latin edition by Fra Giocondo (1511) In parallel with the study of the text, ancient buildings were methodically copied and surveyed. These studies served two practical and idealistic aims: much as artists create an ideal figure by measuring human bodies, architects used the comparison of ancient buildings to establish the most harmonious proportions and the most perfect forms. Furthermore, they were regarded as visible evidence of the Roman virtues upon which the former empire was founded. By copying the architecture, the aim was to recapture a part of this former grandeur.

Starting from Florence, the new architectural style slowly spread throughout the rest of Italy, which was still dominated by Gothic architecture, and became fully established in both the north and south by the late 15th century. However, distinct regional characteristics and preferences for certain materials persisted, such as the colourful marble cladding in Venice or the rich brick and terracotta ornamentation in Lombardy.

=== Music ===
During the Italian Renaissance, music underwent changes and developments in a wide variety of areas. In addition to the development of new song forms such as the madrigal and the invention of music printing by Ottaviano dei Petrucci, new musical instruments, such as the violin, also appeared. New developments and insights also emerged in music theory, as reflected in numerous works. Translations of Greek treatises on music by Pseudo-Euclid, Cleonides, Ptolemy, Aristotle, Aristides Quintilianus, Bacchius the Elder, and Pseudo-Plutarch led to an intensive study of ancient musical thought. Nicola Vicentino, for example, devoted the majority of his treatise L'Antica musica ridotta alla moderna prattica (Rome, 1555) to a practical method for adapting the chromatic and enharmonic modes to modern composition. In it, he demonstrated how the octave can be divided consistently into semitones for the chromatic mode and into quarter-tones for the enharmonic mode. Others, such as Gioseffo Zarlino, developed new ideas regarding counterpoint and consonant ratios.

=== Mannerism ===
Beginning in the 1520s, Mannerism brought about a shift in art and architecture. The term is derived from the Italian word "maniera", which in the 16th century meant "style" or "elegance". Painters rejected the classical principles of the High Renaissance in favor of a more subjective and expressive approach. Sculptors shifted from the frontal perspective of the High Renaissance to a style that favored multiple viewpoints. This is particularly evident in the concept of "figura serpentinata", in which the viewer can move around the statue, making it appear to be in constant motion. In architecture, Mannerism found expression in a fixation on form, to which everything else is subordinated. Elements such as columns, arches, or window niches may appear purely functional, while in reality they are merely wall decorations. Conversely, unusual, idiosyncratic, or non-classical architectural design elements can obscure an actual function.

Notable examples of Mannerism can be found in the works of Parmigianino (1503–1540), Rosso Fiorentino (1495–1540), and Jacopo da Pontormo (1494–1556). Particularly noteworthy here are: Madonna with the Long Neck (ca. 1535), Moses Defends the Daughters of Jethro (1523), and The Deposition (ca. 1528), which, with their inconsistencies in scale and anatomical forms, represent a departure from the harmony of the High Renaissance. Examples of these changes in architecture include Michelangelo’s designs for the New Sacristy (1519–1533) at San Lorenzo and the vestibule of the Laurentian Library (from 1524) in Florence, where interior walls are treated as sculptural elements—like facades turned inward. Giulio Romano (c. 1499–1546) also deliberately employed ambiguous forms and a novel approach to wall surfaces in his designs for the Palazzo del Tè (from 1526), thereby moving away from the balanced proportions of the High Renaissance.

== Historiography ==
Any unified theory of a renaissance, or cultural overhaul, during the European early modern period, is overwhelmed by a massive volume of differing historiographical approaches. Historians like Jacob Burckhardt (1818–1897) have often romanticized the enlightened vision that Italian Renaissance writers have promulgated concerning their own narrative of denouncing the fruitlessness of the Middle Ages. By promoting the Renaissance as the definitive end to the "stagnant" Middle Ages, the Renaissance has acquired the powerful and enduring association with progress and prosperity for which Burckhardt's The Civilization of the Renaissance in Italy is most responsible. Modern scholars have objected to this prevailing narrative, citing the medieval period's own vibrancy and key continuities that link, rather than divide, the Middle Ages and the Renaissance.

Elizabeth Lehfeldt (2005) points to the Black Death as a turning point in Europe that set in motion several movements that were gaining massive traction in the years before, and has accounted for many subsequent events and trends in Western civilization, such as the Reformation. Rather than see this as a distinct cutoff between eras of history, the rejuvenated approach to studying the Renaissance aims to look at this as a catalyst that accelerated trends in art and science that were already well developed. For example, Danse Macabre, the artistic movement using death as the focal point, is often credited as a Renaissance trend, yet Lehfeldt argues that the emergence of Gothic art during medieval times was morphed into Danse Macabre after the Black Death swept over Europe.

Recent historians who take a more revisionist perspective, such as Charles Haskins (1860–1933), identify the hubris and nationalism of Italian politicians, thinkers, and writers as the cause of the distortion of the attitude towards the early modern period. In The Renaissance of the Twelfth Century (1927), Haskins asserts that it is human nature to draw stark divides in history to better understand the past. However, it is essential to understand history as continuous and constantly building off of the past. Haskins was one of the leading scholars in this school of thought, and it was his (along with several others) belief that the building blocks for the Italian Renaissance were all laid during the Middle Ages, calling on the rise of towns and bureaucratic states in the late 11th century as proof of the significance of this "pre-renaissance." The flow of history that he describes paints the Renaissance as a continuation of the Middle Ages that may not have been as positive of a change as popularly imagined. Many historians after Burckhardt have argued that the regression of the Latin language, economic recession, and social inequality during the Renaissance have been intentionally glossed over by previous historians in order to promote the mysticism of the era.

Burckhardt described the Middle Ages as a period that was "seen clad in strange hues", promoting the idea that this era was dark, confusing, and unprogressive. The term middle ages was first referred to by humanists such as Petrarch and Biondo, during the late 15th century, describing it as a period connecting a beginning and an end, and as a placeholder for the history that exists between both sides of the period. This period was eventually referred to as the "dark" ages in the 19th century by English historians, which has further tainted the narrative of medieval times in favour of promoting a positive feeling of individualism and humanism that spurred from the Renaissance.

== See also ==
- Italian Renaissance garden
- Italian Renaissance interior design
- Renaissance illumination
- Neapolitan Renaissance
- Index of Renaissance articles

== Bibliography ==
- Abulafia, David (2008). "Italy in the age of Dante and Petrarch: The Italian south". In Michael Jones (ed.). c. 1300–c. 1415. The New Cambridge Medieval History. Vol. VI. Cambridge: Cambridge University Press. ISBN 978-0-521-36290-0.
- Ady, C.M. (1964). Lorenzo dei Medici. London: English University Press.
- Anglin, W. S.; Lambek, J. (1995). "Mathematics in the Renaissance". In Anglin, W. S.; Lambek, J. (eds.). The Heritage of Thales. Undergraduate Texts in Mathematics. New York: Springer. doi:10.1007/978-1-4612-0803-7_25. ISBN 978-1-4612-0803-7.
- Avery, Catherine (1972). The New Century Italian Renaissance Encyclopedia. New York: Appleton-Century-Crofts.
- Baron, Hans (1955). The Crisis of the Early Italian Renaissance: Civic Humanism and Republican Liberty in an Age of Classicism and Tyranny. Vol. 1. Princeton: Princeton University Press. ISBN 0-691-00752-7.
- Baron, Hans; et al. (The New Cambridge Modern History) (2008). "Fifteenth-century civilisation and the Renaissance". The Renaissance 1493–1520. Vol. 1. Cambridge: Cambridge University Press. ISBN 0-521-04541-X.
- Bartlett, Kenneth (2005). The Italian Renaissance part 2. teaching company. ISBN 1-59803-061-2.
- Bernier, Olivier (1983). The Renaissance Princes. Stonehenge Press. ISBN 0-86706-085-9.
- Bouton, Charles P. (1991). Neurolinguistics: Historical and Theoretical Perspectives. New York: Plenum Press. ISBN 0-306-43691-4.
- Burke, Peter (1999). The Italian Renaissance: Culture and Society in Italy. Princeton: Princeton University Press. ISBN 978-0-691-16240-9.
- Butler Fletcher, Jefferson (1964). Literature of The Italian Renaissance. Kennikat Press.
- Cassis, Youssef; Grossman, Richard S.; Schenk, Catherine Ruth (2016). The Oxford Handbook of Banking and Financial History. Oxford: Oxford University Press. ISBN 978-0-19-965862-6.
- Celenza, Christopher (2018). The Intellectual World of The Italian Renaissance. Cambridge: Cambridge University Press. ISBN 978-1-107-00362-0.
- Collins, Roger (2009). Keepers of the Keys of Heaven: A History of the Papacy. New York: Basic Books. ISBN 978-0-465-01195-7.
- Conaway Bondanella, Julia; Musa, Mark (1987). The Italian Renaissance Reader. New York: New American Library. ISBN 0-452-00873-5.
- Crum, Roger J. (2001). "Severing the Neck of Pride: Donatello's "Judith and Holofernes" and the Recollection of Albizzi Shame in Medicean Florence". Artibus et Historiae. 22 (44). JSTOR 1483711.
- Deimling, Barbara; et al. (The Art of the Italian Renaissance: Architecture, Sculpture, Painting, Prawing) (2008). Early Renaissance Art in Florence and Central Italy. Tandem. ISBN 978-3-8331-5021-0.
- Eves, Howard (1964). An Introduction to the History of Mathematics. New York: Holt Rinehart and Winston.
- Finger, Stanley (2001). Origins of Neuroscience: A History of Explorations into Brain function. Oxford: Oxford University Press. ISBN 0-19-514694-8.
- Freedman, Paul; Spiegel, Gabrielle M. (1998). "Medievalisms Old and New: The Rediscovery of Alterity in North American Medieval Studies". The American Historical Review. 103 (3). doi:10.2307/2650568.
- Gleeson-White, Jane (2011). Double Entry: How the Merchants of Venice shaped the Modern World and how their Invention could make or break the Planet. Crows Nest, N.S.W.: Allen & Unwin. ISBN 1-74175-755-X.
- Goldthwaite, Richard A. (1987). "The Economy of Renaissance Italy: The Preconditions for Luxury Consumption". I Tatti Studies. 2. JSTOR 4603651.
- Grendler, Paul F., ed. (1999a). "Abrabanel–civility". Encyclopedia of the Renaissance. Vol. I. New York: Scribner. ISBN 0-684-80508-1.
- Grendler, Paul F., ed. (1999b). "Class–Furió Ceriol". Encyclopedia of the Renaissance. Vol. II. New York: Scribner. ISBN 0-684-80509-X.
- Grendler, Paul F., ed. (1999c). "Galen–Lyon". Encyclopedia of the Renaissance. Vol. III. New York: Scribner. ISBN 0-684-80510-3.
- Grendler, Paul F., ed. (1999d). "Machiavelli–Petrarchism". Encyclopedia of the Renaissance. Vol. IV. New York: Scribner. ISBN 0-684-80511-1.
- Grendler, Paul F., ed. (1999e). "Peucer-Sforza". Encyclopedia of the Renaissance. Vol. V. New York: Scribner. ISBN 0-684-80512-X.
- Grendler, Paul F., ed. (1999f). "Shakespeare-Zwingli". Encyclopedia of the Renaissance. Vol. VI. New York: Scribner. ISBN 0-684-80513-8.
- Grendler, Paul F. (2004). The Universities of the Italian Renaissance. Johns Hopkins University Press. ISBN 0-8018-8055-6.
- Hale, J. R.; et al. (The New Cambridge Modern History) (2008). "International relations in the West: diplomacy and war". The Renaissance 1493–1520. Vol. 1. Cambridge: Cambridge University Press. ISBN 0-521-04541-X.
- Hall, Marie Boas (1994). The Scientific Renaissance 1450–1630. Courier Corporation. ISBN 978-0-486-28115-5.
- Hartt, Frederick (2011). History of Italian Art: Painting, Sculpture, Architecture. Thames and Hudson. ISBN 0-500-23677-1.
- Haskins, Charles H. (1955). The Renaissance of the Twelfth Century. Cambridge, Ma.: Harvard University Press.
- Havely, Nick (2008). "Literature in Italian, French and English: uses and muses of thevernacular". In Michael Jones (ed.). c. 1300–c. 1415. The New Cambridge Medieval History. Vol. VI. Cambridge: Cambridge University Press. ISBN 978-0-521-36290-0.
- Hollingsworth, Mary (1994). Patronage in Renaissance Italy: From 1400 to the Early Sixteenth Century. London: John Murray. ISBN 0-7195-4926-4.
- Hudson, Hugh (2013). "The Classical Ideal of Male Beauty in Renaissance Italy: A Note on the Afterlife of Virgil's Euryalus". Journal of the Warburg and Courtauld Institutes. 76. doi:10.1086/JWCI24395521. ISSN 0075-4390. JSTOR 24395521. S2CID 190242716.
- Jensen, De Lamar (1992). Renaissance Europe: Age of Recovery and Reconciliation. D. C. Heath. ISBN 0-669-20007-7.
- Jones, Michael (2008). "Introduction". In Michael Jones (ed.). c. 1300–c. 1415. The New Cambridge Medieval History. Vol. VI. Cambridge: Cambridge University Press. ISBN 978-0-521-36290-0.
- Law, John (2008). "Italy in the age of Dante and Petrarch: The Italian north". In Michael Jones (ed.). c. 1300–c. 1415. The New Cambridge Medieval History. Vol. VI. Cambridge: Cambridge University Press. ISBN 978-0-521-36290-0.
- Lehfeldt, Elizabeth A. (2005). The Black Death. Houghton Mifflin. ISBN 0-618-46342-9.
- Lundin, Robert W. (1985). Theories and Systems of Psychology. Lexington, Mass.: D.C. Heath. ISBN 0-669-06744-X.
- Mallett, Michael (2008). "Italy (a) The northern Italien states". In Christopher Allmand (ed.). c. 1415–c. 1500. The New Cambridge Medieval History. Vol. VII. Cambridge: Cambridge University Press. ISBN 0-521-38296-3.
- Mallett, Michael; et al. (The Oxford Illustrated History of Italy) (2001). George Holmes (ed.). Politics and Society 1250 – 1600. Oxford: Oxford University Press. ISBN 0-19-285444-5.
- Mallett, Michael (2012). The Italian Wars, 1494-1559: War, State and Society in Early Modern Europe. New York: Pearson. ISBN 978-0-582-05758-6.
- Maginnis, Hayden B. J. (1997). Painting in the Age of Giotto: A Historical Reevaluation. University Park: Pennsylvania State University Press. ISBN 0-271-01599-3.
- Mueller von der Haegen, Anne; Strasser, Ruth (2005). Art & Architecture Tuscany. Cologne: Könemann. ISBN 3-8331-1487-8.
- Murray, Peter (1964). The Architecture of the Italian Renaissance. New York: Schocken Books.
- Osborne, Roger (2008). Civilization: A New History of the Western World. Random House. ISBN 978-0-09-952606-3.
- Pullan, Brian S. (1973). History of early Renaissance Italy: From the mid-thirteenth to the mid-fifteenth century. London: Allen Lane. ISBN 978-0-7139-0304-1. OCLC 613989155.
- Raunch, Alexander; et al. (The Italian Renaissance: Architecture, Sculpture, Painting, Drawing) (2008). Rolf Toman (ed.). Painting of the High Renaissance and Mannerism in Rome and Central Italy. Tandem. ISBN 978-3-8331-5021-0.
- Rundle, David (2000). The Hutchinson Encyclopedia of the Renaissance. Helicon. ISBN 1-85986-332-9.
- Shearman, John K. G (1967). Mannerism. Harmondsworth: Penguin.
- Stokstad, Marilyn (2008). Art History. Pearson Education Inc. ISBN 0-13-605406-4.
- Strathern, Paul (2005). The Medici: Godfathers of the Renaissance. London: Pimlico. ISBN 1-84413-098-3.
- Strauss, Leo; et al. (History of Political Philosophy) (1987). Leo Strauss, Joseph Cropsey (ed.). Niccolo Machiavelli. University of Chicago Press. ISBN 0-226-77710-3.
- Turner, Jane, ed. (2000). Encyclopedia of Italian Renaissance and Mannerist Art. Oxford: Macmillan. ISBN 0-333-76094-8.
- Weinstein, Donald (2011). Savonarola: The Rise and Fall of a Renaissance Prophet. New Haven: Yale University Press. ISBN 0-300-11193-2.
- Wittkower, R.; et al. (The New Cambridge Modern History) (2008). "The arts in Western Europe: Italy". The Renaissance 1493–1520. Vol. 1. Cambridge: Cambridge University Press. ISBN 0-521-04541-X.
- Wundrum, Manfred; et al. (Masterpieces of Western Art) (2007). Ingo F. Walther (ed.). Renaissance and Mannerism. Taschen. ISBN 0-681-14027-5.
- Zirpolo, Lilian H. (2009). The A to Z of Renaissance art. Lanham: Scarecrow Press. ISBN 0-8108-7043-6.
