= Philosophy of archaeology =

Philosophical framework used in investigating archaeological practices

The philosophy of archaeology seeks to investigate the foundations, methods and implications of the discipline of archaeology in order to further understand the human past and present.

Core questions address the definition of archaeology, its theoretical foundations, and the ways in which the discipline conceptualizes time. They also examine the purposes of archaeology, including why it is conducted and for whose benefit, as well as the nature and reality of the materials and processes that constitute archaeological inquiry. Analytic philosophy of archaeology explores the conceptual structure underlying terms such as artefact, site, archaeological record, and archaeological culture. These issues represent part of the broader metaphysical, aesthetic, epistemological, ethical, and theoretical concerns central to archaeological practice.

In addition to these general questions, the philosophy of archaeology is also concerned with fieldwork methodology, integration of theory and collaboration with other disciplines, theories of measurement and data representation.

Philosophy of archaeology can also denote a certain approach or attitude applied to the discipline, such as feminist, Marxist, humanist or processual for example. These approaches are generally referred to as "theory" by archaeologists and are sometimes conflated with, but are not the same as, analytic philosophy of archaeology. See Archeological theory for a full description of these approaches.

There is currently little consensus amongst archaeologists on the nature of the problems in the philosophy of archaeology, or indeed in some cases, whether a philosophy of archaeology should, or even can, exist. As such, the discipline is not highly developed, with even its existence or relevance disputed by some archaeologists. However, it is generally recognised that an awareness of the philosophical issues and framework of the subject through research into the philosophy of archaeology is important for progress in the discipline as well as for designing research, controlling inference and interpretation, and in classification.

== History ==
The roots of archaeological enquiry can be traced ultimately to mankinds urge to explain the origin of the world around them. These early cosmological explanations for the origins of the universe took the form of mythology. With the rise of complex civilisations such as Sumer, Babylon, Egypt and Persia, and with their increasingly sophisticated priesthood, these mythological explanations became also more sophisticated.

These philosophies claimed that there was a beginning, an origin of all things, and conceived it as a formless void or Chaos out of which all matter was created. These explanations established the idea of a first principle or origin underlying and uniting all things, an idea that was passed into Greek as the word arché/ἀρχῆ.

=== Greek philosophy ===
Initially, in keeping with its origins, the arché in Greek thought was believed to be divine, as for example in the 8th century BC cosmogony of Hesiod. But, in the 7th century BC Thales of Miletus, taking the concept of the arché from mythology, was the first to say that it was not divine in origin, but natural. He went on to claim that the arché was water. The Greek philosophers that came after him continued the search for the arché in nature and because of this they were known as physiologoi (meaning physical or natural philosophers) to differentiate them from the theologoi, who based their philosophy on a supernatural basis. Archaeology therefore inherited the burden of explaining the origin of things, and how they change, both once the exclusive preserve of religion, without recourse to divine intervention.

Thus, the scientific approach of archaeology can be traced in the west to the Ancient Greeks and their search for the origin or first principle of causation in nature rather than in the divine. Once the search for explanation was separated from divine sources and combined with principles such as Parmenides of Elea's dictum that nothing comes from nothing the search for the principles of causation led to the belief that the world and its processes could be rendered intelligible through rational thought. This led to the further realisation that the natural history and development of humanity might also be rationally investigated.

In this way the principle of sufficient reason, the principle of causal synonymy, along with the axiom that nothing can come from nothing, led to the foundation of archaeological enquiry as a process of natural science. Archaeology is therefore a development of the early history of the philosophy of science

The search for the arche was then applied to mankind, leading to the first theories of the evolution of organisms. However, despite philosophers realisation that mankind must have been once more primitive, and some attempts towards explaining the development of human speech along evolutionary lines, archaeology In the Classical world remained a predominantly philosophical pursuit.

=== Submersion and recovery ===
Its development was interrupted by the rise of Christian scholasticism and the re-establishment of divine origin explanations in western culture in the 4th and 5th centuries AD. The recovery of concepts was spurred by the rediscovery of Lucretius' Epicurean poem "On Nature" which set out an archaeological explanation for the evolution of humans. The revival of Classical studies during the Renaissance was an archaeological exercise though not scientific in its process.

=== Modern development ===
Developments in the 19th century with Hutton's and Lyell's theory of uniformitarianism and Darwin's theory of natural selection both of which set the stage for the modern scientific investigation into the origin of humanity.

== Epistemology ==
Archaeological epistemology concerns what archaeological knowledge is, its particularities, how it can be acquired, and the extent to which it can be known about something. It also concerns the subjective or objective nature of archaeological enquiry, and the standards that should apply to claims to archaeological knowledge. As Alison Wylie explained, "[w]hat you find, archaeologically, has everything to do with what you look for, with the questions you ask and the conceptual resources you bring to bear in attempting to answer them."

== Ontology ==
The ontology of archaeology is concerned with what archaeological entities exist, can be said to exist, and what their relations to each other might be. For example, what is an artefact, a site or a culture and do they exist as separate entities? If entities are agreed to exist how should they be categorised or recorded. A branch of research in archaeological ontology is known as typology which attempts to sort objects into classes based on physical characteristics.

The existence and nature of time is also of concern in archaeological ontology. For example, what effect does periodisation, e.g. the three age model, have on archaeological theory and practice. Questions of the ontological nature of both time and objects are of great importance in the design of archaeological databases and are of increasing importance as the computerisation of archaeological processes and data increases.

== Theory ==
The philosophy of archaeology is also concerned with the construction of theories within the discipline. Archaeology is a theoretically fragmented field with no generally applied interpretative theory underpinning the discipline. A multitude of different theoretical approaches have developed over the last 50 years and exist in parallel across the discipline. These range broadly from an empirical archaeology viewed as a science, to a relativistic post-modern concept of archaeology as an ideology that cannot verify its own concepts.

Therefore, the search for a unifying explanatory theory is a major concern among philosophers of archaeology. However, even the possibility of such a theory is denied by some archaeologists, emphasising the dislocation in archaeological approaches.

== Ethics ==
Archaeological ethics investigates issues surrounding the use of archaeological sites and materials. Who sanctions, controls and pays for such use is often disputed. For example, concerning the rights of indigenous people, especially in colonial situations where archaeology may be used to support narratives of oppression or dispossession. Or those whose beliefs are incompatible with certain archaeological practices, such as the removal of bodies from ancient graveyards.

Other examples include the use of archaeology for political purposes, such as land claims, or to prop up regimes or certain ideologies for example the notorious Ahnenerbe under the Third Reich.

The study of bias in archaeological narratives for example the association of archaeology with colonial history and subsequent issues over ownership of artifacts. For example, the continuing controversy over the Elgin Marbles.
