= Bjørnar Olsen =

Norwegian archaeologist

Bjørnar Julius Olsen (born 2 January 1958, Finnmark, Norway) is professor at UiT - The Arctic University of Norway. He is a Norwegian archaeologist who specializes in archaeological theory, material culture, museology, northern/Arctic archaeology, and contemporary archaeology. Olsen is a prominent figure in the turn to things in humanities and social sciences, including symmetrical archaeology.

== Career ==
Olsen was born in a small fishing village in Finnmark, Norway. He received his PhD from the University of Tromsø in 1984 and was a visiting researcher at the University of Cambridge 1985–1986. He became a full professor in 1991 (at the age of 33) and since 1994 has been professor of archaeology at the Institute of Archaeology, History, Religious Studies, and Theology at UiT - The Arctic University of Norway. Olsen currently lives in Tromsø with his wife and three children. He is a fellow of the Norwegian Academy of Science and Letters.

Olsen was a figure in the development of post-processualism and theoretical archaeology during the 1980s and 1990s and is now at the forefront of the development of new approaches to things, including symmetrical archaeology, the archaeology of the contemporary period, and material culture studies. He is also an international leader in the development of archaeological theory and Sámi prehistory/history. Olsen has published 10 books (and close to 160 scientific papers), including Archaeology: The Discipline of Things (2012 with Michael Shanks (archaeologist), Timothy Webmoor and Christopher Witmore), In Defense of Things: Archaeology and the Ontology of Objects (2010), Persistent memories: Pyramiden – a Soviet mining town in the High Arctic (2010, with Elin Andreassen and Hein Bjerck; see Pyramiden), and Ruin Memories: Materiality, Aesthetics and the Archaeology of the Recent Past (2018, editor with Þóra Pétursdóttir).

== In Defense of Things: Archaeology and the Ontology of Objects ==
Olsen, being an academic and an author, is also known for his rebellious streak and willingness to explore new and emerging theoretical or philosophical directions while persuading the reader to give said theory more thought. He brings material culture and the weight of identifying an object's ontology upon discovery to light in his 2010 book In Defense of Things: Archaeology and the Ontology of Objects. By first introducing the reader to the meaning of material culture, which is defined as objects influenced by human interaction maintain their integrity through time, he then begins to tie this material significance of landscape and topography to the discipline of archaeology. Olsen puts it best by stating “This book is grounded in a realist attitude in the sense that I do believe the material world exists and that things constitute a fundamental and persistent foundation of our existence. Things, materials, and landscapes possess real qualities affecting and shaping both our perception of them and our cohabitation with them.”

Olsen then analyzes the importance of understanding an object's ontology apart from its original intended purpose. What's around us and what is/was previously made is affected by our presence and we're affected in turn. He breaks down the supremacy of humans over objects and introduces the practice of a symmetrical approach to archaeology and life as a whole. By viewing humans, animals, and objects symmetrically, the value of each entity can become more balanced. While addressing archaeology's past fixation on material culture, Olsen rejects the standard archaeological method of finding a meaning behind things. He argues that an object's memory poses as part of its ontology without needing to symbolize something other than it is, or the new purpose the object is given when rediscovered.

Olsen is director of the Unruly Heritage: An Archaeology of the Anthropocene project which focuses on industrial ruins, abandoned fishing villages, World War II remains, and mining sites in Norway, Russia, Iceland, and Canada. Olsen's previous projects were Object Matters: Archaeology and Heritage in the 21st Century (2014 - 2018) and Ruin Memories: Materiality, Aesthetics, and the Archaeology of the Recent Past (2010 - 2014). These projects dealt with similar issues regarding the archaeology of the recent past.

== Publications ==
- In Defense of Things. Archaeology and the Ontology of Objects B. Olsen, AltaMira Press, Lanham, MD. (2010)
- Persistent memories. Pyramiden – a Soviet mining town in the High Arctic B. Olsen (with H. Bjerck, E. Andreassen (2010)
- Hybrid Spaces. Medieval Finnmark and the archaeology of multi-room houses B. Olsen. Nouvs Forlag (2011)
- Archaeology: The Discipline of Things B. Olsen (with M. Shanks, T. Webmoor, and C. Witmore (2012)
- W obronie rzeczy. Archeologia I ontologia przedmiotów. B. Olsen, Translated by Bozena Shallcross. Warszawa: Instytut Badan Literakich (2013)
- Ruin Memories: Materiality, Aesthetics and the Archaeology of the Recent Past B. Olsen (with Þ. Pétursdóttir) pp. 162-190. London: Routledge (2014)
- (with Lars Ivar Hansen) Hunters in Transition. An Outline of Early Sámi History, The Northern World: North Europe and the Baltic c. 400–1700 AD. Peoples, Economics and Cultures, 63 (Leiden: Brill, 2014), ISBN 978-90-04-25254-7.
- Archaeology, symmetry, and the ontology of things. A response to critics. B. Olsen (with C. Witmore) Archaeological Dialogues 22(2): 187-197 (2015)
- Sámi archaeology, postcolonial theory, and criticism. B. Olsen. Fennoscandia Archaeologica XXXIII: 141-155 (2016)
