= Velike Dole pri Temenici =

Velike Dole pri Temenici Velike Dole (until 1953) Velike Dole pri Šentjurju (1953–1997)
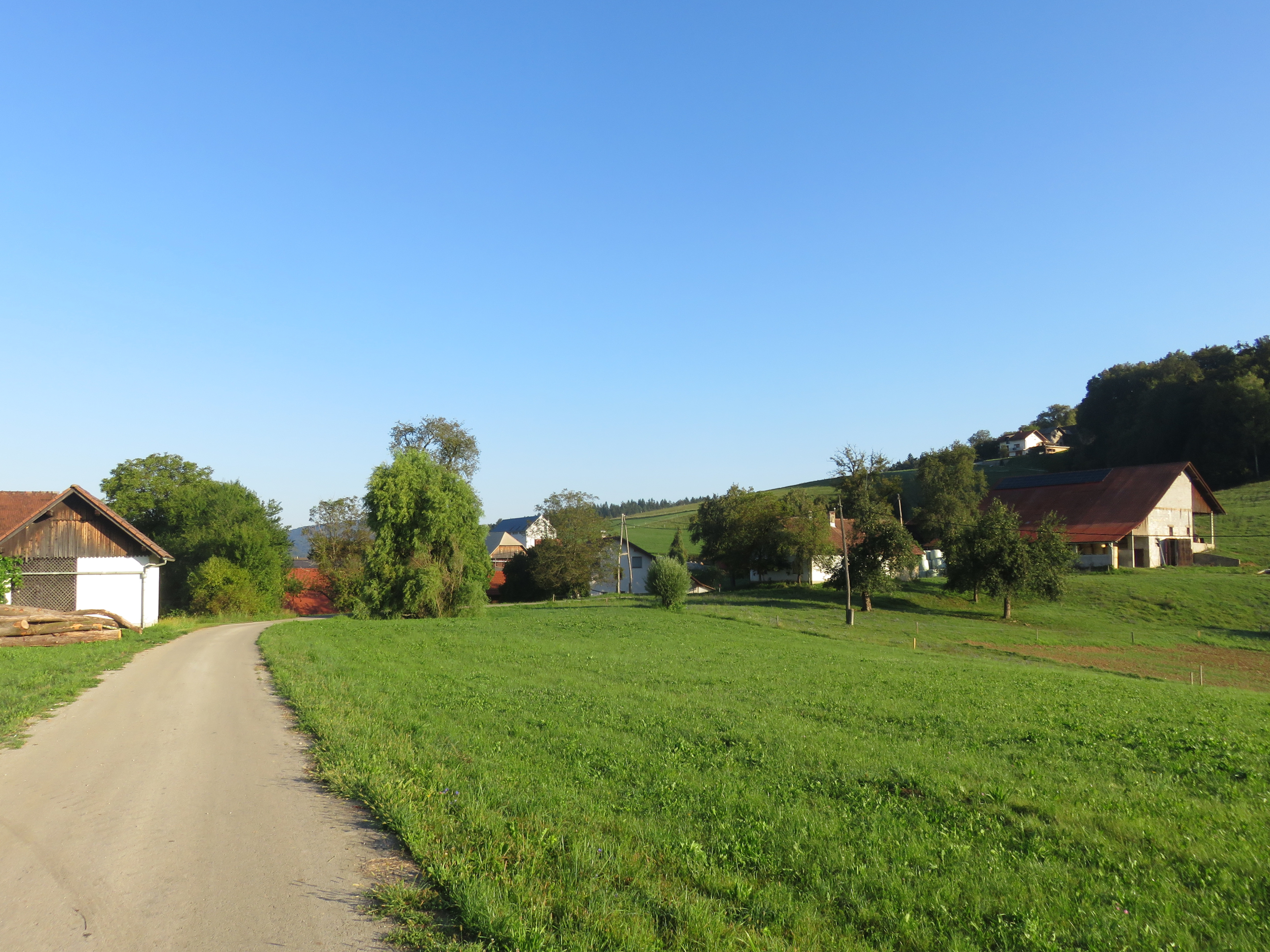

- Location in Slovenia
- Coordinates: 45°57′21.45″N 14°54′17.7″E
- Country: Slovenia
- Traditional region: Lower Carniola
- Statistical region: Central Slovenia
- Municipality: Ivančna Gorica

Area
  - Total: 0.63 km^{2} (0.24 sq mi)
- Elevation: 336.2 m (1,103 ft)

Population (2002)
  - Total: 32

Velike Dole pri Temenici (pronounced [ˈʋeːlikɛ ˈdoːlɛ pɾi ˈteːmɛnitsi]; German: Großdule) is a small settlement in the Municipality of Ivančna Gorica in central Slovenia. The area is part of the historical region of Lower Carniola. The municipality is now included in the Central Slovenia Statistical Region.

== Name ==
The name of the settlement was changed from Velike Dole to Velike Dole pri Šentjurju in 1953. The name was changed again to Velike Dole pri Temenici in 1997. In the past the German name was Großdule.

== History ==
Archaeological evidence shows the area was already settled in the Late Bronze Age.
