= Christopher Witmore =

Archaeologist and researcher

Professor of Archaeology Christopher Witmore
- Occupation: Archaeologist

Academic background
- Education: Stanford University; University of Sheffield; University of North Carolina, Greensboro

Christopher Witmore (born February 17, 1974, Laurinburg, NC) is an American archaeologist and Paul Whitfield Horn Distinguished Professor of Archaeology and Classics at Texas Tech University. His research encompasses archaeological theory, material culture and thing studies, landscape archaeology, contemporary archaeology, and archaeology’s engagements with the Anthropocene. He is particularly associated with symmetrical archaeology and with approaches that treat material things as objects of archaeological inquiry rather than merely as evidence for reconstructing human societies.

Witmore’s field research has included long-term landscape studies in Greece, the archaeology of a Second World War prisoner-of-war camp in Arctic Norway, Roman archaeology in Britain, and community archaeology in North Carolina. His books include Old Lands: A Chorography of the Eastern Peloponnese (2020), Objects Untimely: Object-Oriented Philosophy and Archaeology (with Graham Harman, 2023), and Pasts Otherwise: An Archaeology of War (with Bjørnar Olsen, 2026).

== Education ==
Witmore earned his BA in archaeology, classics, and geography from the University of North Carolina at Greensboro in 1996, a MA in Landscape Archaeology at the University of Sheffield in 1998, and a PhD from Stanford University in 2005.

== Career ==
Witmore is co-editor of the Routledge Archaeological Orientations series and sits on the Editorial Board of the Journal of Contemporary Archaeology. From 2006 to 2009, he was a postdoctoral research fellow with the Joukowsky Institute for Archaeology and the Ancient World at Brown University. In 2009 he joined the Department of Modern Languages and Literatures at Texas Tech University where he is the President's Excellence in Research Professor of archaeology and the head of classics.

Witmore also held a research fellowship at the National Humanities Center from 2014 to 2015. In 2017 he was a Senior Research Fellow with the Centre for Advanced Study at the Norwegian Academy of Science and Letters.

He teaches at Texas Tech University courses on archaeology, landscape, Classics, the history of technology, and the theory and philosophy of archaeology.

== Research and authorship ==
Witmore’s early theoretical work contributed to the development of symmetrical archaeology, an approach concerned with how archaeologists work with material things and with the roles those things play in producing archaeological knowledge. His 2007 article “Symmetrical Archaeology: Excerpts of a Manifesto” became one of the principal statements associated with this approach. His subsequent work has addressed materiality, archaeological practice, media, object-oriented philosophy, and relationships between archaeology and the present.

With Bjørnar Olsen, Michael Shanks (archaeologist), and Timothy Webmoor, Witmore co-authored Archaeology: The Discipline of Things (2012), which argued for greater attention to archaeology’s material objects, instruments, practices, and forms of documentation. He later collaborated with philosopher Graham Harman on Objects Untimely (2023), a study of objects, time, and archaeological interpretation. According to the philosopher Jon Cogburn, "Objects Untimely develops a radical object-oriented theory of archaeology while simultaneously providing a novel account of time's dependence upon objects."

Witmore’s landscape research has concentrated especially on Greece. In Old Lands (2020), he used chorography—a mode of writing attentive to the particularities of regions and places—to explore the eastern Peloponnese across multiple periods. The book combines archaeological remains, ancient and modern texts, environmental observations, and encounters made while traveling through the region. It subsequently became the subject of a discussion forum in the Journal of Mediterranean Archaeology. Old Lands, according to the American Philosopher Levi Bryant is a book that "defies categorization, it is part history, part travel diary, part reflection on the present, and part theoretical reflection on archaeology and how archaeology ought to be conducted."

Witmore has also worked with Olsen and other collaborators at Sværholt, a former German coastal battery and prisoner-of-war camp in Arctic Norway. Their research examines what archaeological engagement with ruins and abandoned objects can contribute to the study of war beyond documentary and commemorative histories. This work culminated in Pasts Otherwise: An Archaeology of War (2026).

His more recent research connects long-term changes in agriculture, land use, human relationships with other species, and material production to debates concerning the Anthropocene. He is also a collaborator in the Samothrace LiDAR Project, which investigates occupation, agricultural landscapes, water systems, and changing geomorphology across the island of Samothrace.

== Selected publications ==
- Symmetrical Archaeology: Excerpts of a Manifesto. C. Witmore World Archaeology 39(4): 546-62 (2007)
- Archaeology: The Discipline of Things C. Witmore (with B. Olsen, M. Shanks, and T. Webmoor) (2012)
- Archaeology in the Making: Conversations through a Discipline C. Witmore (co-edited with B. Rathje and M. Shanks) (2013)
- Archaeology and the New Materialisms. C. Witmore The Journal of Contemporary Archaeology 1(2): 203-24 (2014)
- Archaeology, symmetry, and the ontology of things. A response to critics. B. Olsen (with C. Witmore) Archaeological Dialogues 22(2): 187-197 (2015)
- Old Lands: A Chorography of the Eastern Peloponnese C. Witmore Routledge (2020)
- Objects Untimely: Object-oriented philosophy and archaeology C. Witmore (with G. Harman) Polity Press (2023)
- Anthropoiesis revisited: Hominization through the incorporation of nonhumans. C. Witmore The Oxford Handbook of Cognitive Archaeology Oxford University Press: 1215-233 (2024)
- Pasts Otherwise: An Archaeology of War C. Witmore (with B. Olsen) Bloomsbury Press (2026)

== See also ==
- Archaeological theory
- Chorography
- Metamedia
- Ian Hodder
- Michael Shanks (archaeologist)
- Bjørnar Olsen
- Graham Harman

== Sources ==
- Govier, E. (2022). "Pre-critical archaeology. Speculative realism and symmetrical archaeology". Archaeological Dialogues. 29 (2): 188–199. doi:10.1017/S1380203822000241. S2CID 252504900.
- Harris, O.J.; Cipolla, C.N. (2017). Archaeological theory in the new millennium: introducing current perspectives. London: Routledge.
- Witmore, C. (2007). "Symmetrical Archaeology: Excerpts of a Manifesto". World Archaeology. 34 (9): 546–62. doi:10.1080/00438240701679411. S2CID 144287010.
- Witmore, C. (2019). "Symmetrical archaeology". Encyclopedia of Global Archaeology. New York: Springer: 978–93.
- Witmore, C.; Caraher, W.; González-Ruibal, A.; Hanink, J. (2021). "Reviewing Christopher Witmore's Old Lands: A Chorography of the Eastern Peloponnese". Journal of Mediterranean Archaeology. 34 (1). London: Routledge, 2020: 109–31. doi:10.1558/jma.43204. S2CID 237733196.
- Zakaitis, J. (October 2011). "Interview: Jonas Zakaitis talks with Christopher Witmore". The Federal (2): 11–20.
