= Gustav Klemm =

German anthropologist and librarian (1802–1867)

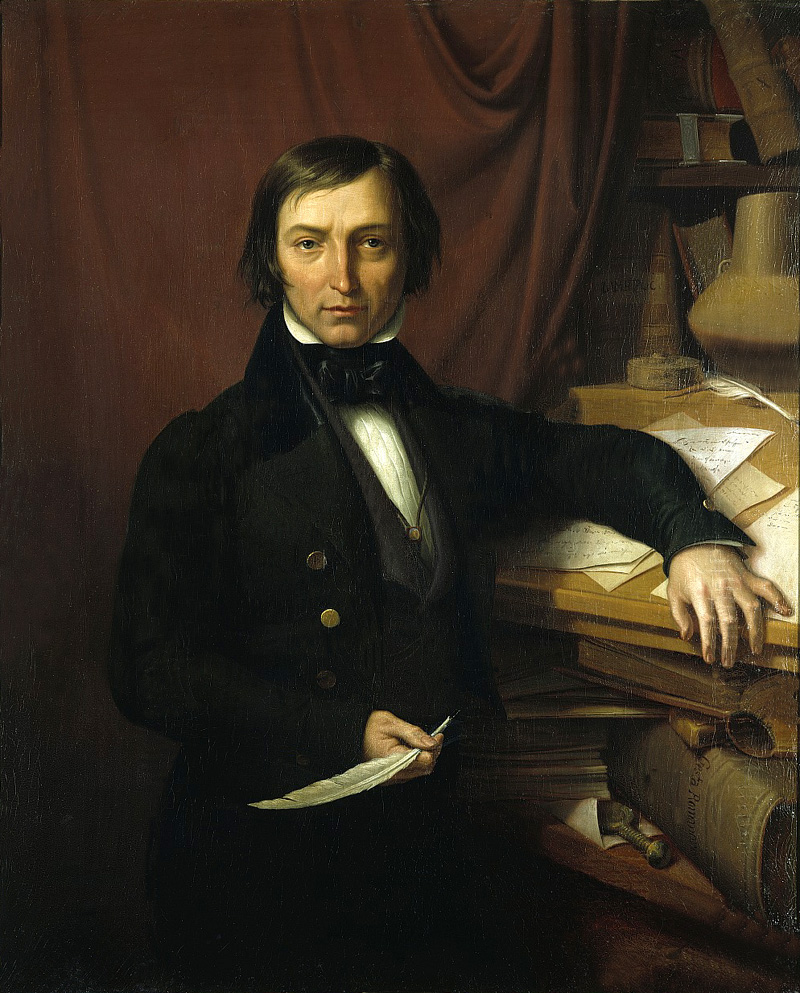
Gustav Klemm

Gustav Friedrich Klemm (12 November 1802, in Chemnitz – 26 August 1867, in Dresden) was a German anthropologist and librarian. He spent much of his career as the Director of the Royal Library in Dresden. The British Museum purchased his large collection of central European prehistoric antiquities in 1868.

Klemm's 10-volume cultural history divided humanity into 'active' races (at the pinnacle of which were Germanic stock) and 'passive' races (Mongoloids, Negroids, Egyptians, Finns and Hindus).

== Works ==
- Allgemeine Kulturgeschichte der Menschheit (General Cultural History of Mankind), 10 vols., 1843–52.
- Allgemeine Kulturwissenschaft (General Science of Culture), 2 vols., 1854-55.
