= Michael Shanks (archaeologist) =

British archaeologist

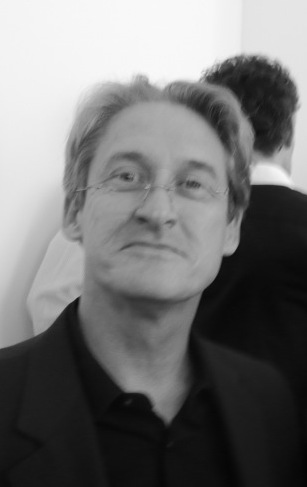
- Michael Shanks in 2008
- Born: Newcastle upon Tyne, England
- Scientific career
- Fields: Classical archaeology, Archaeological theory and Media archaeology

Michael Shanks (born 1959, Newcastle upon Tyne) is a British archaeologist specialising in classical archaeology and archaeological theory. He received his BA, MA and PhD from Cambridge University, and was a lecturer at the University of Wales, Lampeter before moving to the U.S. in 1999 to take up a Chair in Classics at Stanford University.

== Education ==
Shanks graduated from the Royal Grammar School, Newcastle upon Tyne and went on to study at Peterhouse, Cambridge, earning a BA in 1980. After finishing his studies he went on to get a PGCE (Post Graduate Certificate of Education) from Durham University in 1982. He earned a PhD from Cambridge in 1992. Shanks went on to earn a docentur (Higher Doctorate and license to teach) from the Institute of Archaeology in Gothenburg in 1997.

== Career ==
Shanks started his teaching career in 1983 at the Whitley Bay High School where he taught Latin, Ancient Greek and Ancient history. He worked in the school until 1988. In 1991 he was a Research Fellow at the Centre d'Archéologie Classique, Paris 1 (Sorbonne University), Maison des Sciences de l'Homme and the following year a teaching fellow at the University of Wales Lampeter. There, he was one of the academics who developed the framework of performance archaeology. He stayed at the University until 1998 first as a lecturer in Archaeology and then as the Head of Department from 1996 to 1998. After this he went to Stanford University where he is a Professor of Classics. At Stanford he was also the Director of the Stanford Humanities Lab.

He was also a visiting professor at the University College Dublin and Durham University from 2010 to 2013. In 2013 he was made a Research Fellow at Durham University. He was a board member at the Palo Alto History Museum and served on the advisory board of the Humanities Institute of Ireland. For his work he was awarded an honorary doctorate from Roskilde University.

He currently teaches courses at Stanford University focussing on the intersection of archeological thought and modern design thinking methods.

=== Writing ===
Over the years Shanks has written over 50 papers on classical archaeology, archaeological theory and media archaeology. He has published over a dozen books on these topics as well including Experiencing the Past: On the Character of Archaeology (1992), Classical Archaeology of Greece (1996), Art and the Greek City State: An Interpretive Archaeology (1999), The Archaeological Imagination (2012), A walk in time along the Smith River: a small work of theatre/archaeology (2016) and many others. He co-authored the 1995 book Interpreting Archaeology: Finding Meaning in the Past with Ian Hodder and, more recently, Archaeology: The Discipline of Things (2012), a foundational text for symmetrical archaeology, with Bjørnar Olsen and Christopher Witmore.

== Personal life ==
Michael Shanks lives in Northern California with his two children and his wife, Helen Shanks, a ceramic artist and former head of visual and performing arts at Castilleja School in Palo Alto, California.

== Trivia ==
Michael Shanks is also the actor's name of the fictional archaeologist Daniel Jackson in the Series Stargate: SG-1.
