= Archaeological theory =

Intellectual frameworks for interpreting archaeological data

Archaeological theory refers to the various intellectual frameworks through which archaeologists interpret archaeological data. Archaeological theory functions as the application of philosophy of science to archaeology, and is occasionally referred to as philosophy of archaeology. There is no one singular theory of archaeology, but many, with different archaeologists believing that information should be interpreted in different ways. Throughout the history of the discipline, various trends of support for certain archaeological theories have emerged, peaked, and in some cases died out. Different archaeological theories differ on what the goals of the discipline are and how they can be achieved.

Some archaeological theories, such as processual archaeology, holds that archaeologists are able to develop accurate, objective information about past societies by applying the scientific method to their investigations, whilst others, such as post-processual archaeology, dispute this, and claim all archaeological data is tainted by human interpretation and social factors, and any interpretation they make about past societies is therefore subjective.

Other archaeological theories, such as Marxist archaeology, instead interpret archaeological evidence within a framework for how its proponents believe society operates. Marxist archaeologists in general believe that the bipolarism that exists between the processual and post-processual debates is an opposition inherent within knowledge production and is in accord with a dialectical understanding of the world. Many Marxist archaeologists believe that it is this polarism within the anthropological discipline (and all academic disciplines) that fuels the questions that spur progress in archaeological theory and knowledge. This constant interfacing and conflict between the extremes of the two heuristic playing grounds (subjective vs. objective) is believed to result in a continuous reconstruction of the past by scholars.

== Background ==
Since the early 20th century, most accounts of archaeological methodology have accepted the data that is uncovered by the archaeologist is subsequently interpreted through a theoretical viewpoint. Nevertheless, the archaeological community is divided over the extent to which theory pervades the discipline. On one side, there are those who believe that certain archaeological techniques – such as excavation or recording – are neutral and outside of the bounds of theory, while on the other are those who believe that these too are also influenced by theoretical considerations. Archaeologist Ian Hodder, a prominent advocate of the latter view, criticised the alternate approach by highlighting that methodological decisions, such as where to open a trench, how diligently to excavate a stratigraphic layer and whether to keep every artefact discovered, are all based on prior theoretical interpretations of the site, and that even excavatory techniques could not therefore escape the realm of theory. Those who take the former approach have sometimes tried to separate the raw data from the theoretical interpretations in their publications, but have come under criticism from those, such as Hodder, who argue that theoretical interpretation pervades the entire archaeological methodology, and therefore cannot be separated from the raw data.

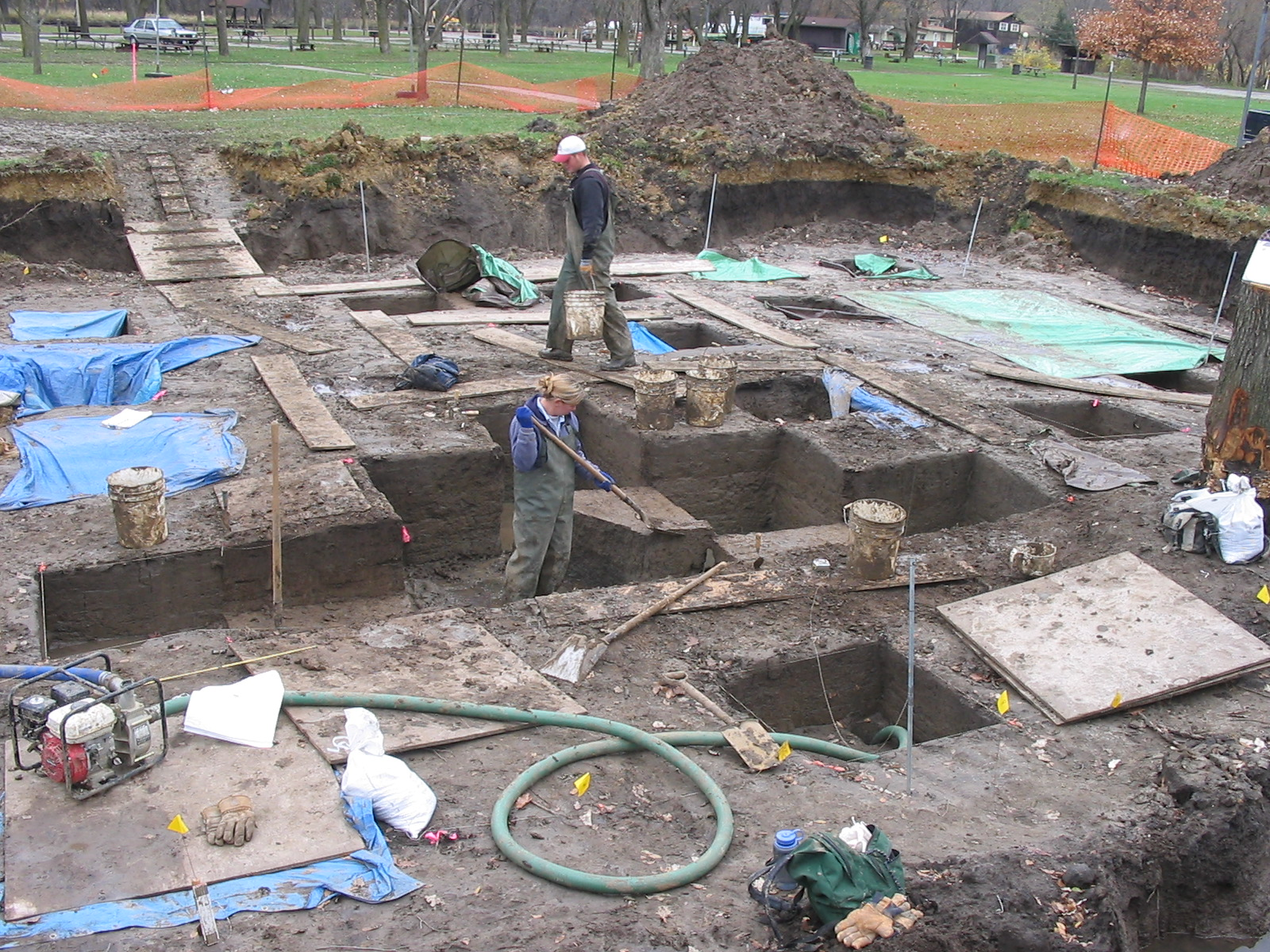
Archaeologists such as Matthew Johnson have argued that most, if not all, aspects of archaeology are informed by theoretical considerations.

In his overview of archaeological theory, the archaeologist Matthew Johnson of the University of Southampton put forward four arguments for why theory was so important to the archaeological discipline, and therefore why all archaeologists should learn about the subject. First, he noted that all of the arguments for why archaeology benefited society were based in theory, and that archaeologists wanting to defend their discipline from its critics would therefore require a grounding in theory. Second, he highlighted that theory was required to compare two different interpretations of the past and decide which one was the more likely. Third, he asserted that theory was needed for the archaeologist to accept and admit to their own personal biases and agendas in interpreting the material evidence. Finally, Johnson put forward what he considered to be the most important reason for the necessity of understanding theory; that all archaeologists, as human beings, are innately theoretical, in that they naturally make use of "theories, concepts, ideas, assumptions" in their work. As such, he asserts that any archaeologist claiming to be "atheoretical" is mistaken, and that in actuality they cloud their own theoretical position under such jargon as "common sense". He proceeded to suggest that most of those western archaeologists who claim to eschew theory in favour of a "common sense" approach were actually exhibiting cultural machismo by playing on the stereotype that intelligent discussions and debates were effeminate and therefore of lesser value.

== Archaeological theories ==
=== Antiquarianism ("antiquities collection") and Imperial synthesis (Prehistory to c. 1880) ===
People's interest of the past has existed since antiquity. During the Western world's Medieval period six main concepts were formed that would come to influence archaeological theory to some degree

1. The world is of recent, supernatural origin at best no more than a few thousand years old
2. The physical world has degraded since God's original creation
3. Humanity was created in the Garden of Eden
4. Standards of human conduct naturally degrade
5. History of the world is a sequence of unique events
6. Culturally, socially, and intellectually the people of the past were identical to the present

The coming of the Renaissance stimulated an interest in the past but it was more on the level of collecting artifacts and romanticized theories of their origin. It was not until the 19th century the first elements of actual systematic study of older civilizations began but they tended to be designed to support imperial nationalism.

=== Cultural-historical (or "historical particularism," "national archaeology") archaeology (c. 1860 - present) ===
Developments in the 19th century with Hutton and Lyell's theory of uniformitarianism and Darwin's theory of natural selection set the stage for the modern scientific investigation into the origin of humanity.

After Darwin came a mode of archaeology known as cultural, or culture history, according to which sites are grouped into distinct "cultures" to determine the geographic spread and time span of these cultures and to reconstruct the interactions and flow of ideas between them. Cultural history, as the name suggests, was closely allied with the science of history. Cultural historians employed the normative model of culture, the principle that each culture is a set of norms governing human behaviour. Thus, cultures can be distinguished by patterns of craftsmanship; for instance, if one excavated sherd of pottery is decorated with a triangular pattern, and another sherd with a chequered pattern, they likely belong to different cultures. Such an approach naturally leads to a view of the past as a collection of different populations, classified by their differences and by their influences on each other. Changes in behaviour could be explained by diffusion whereby new ideas moved, through social and economic ties, from one culture to another.

The Australian archaeologist Vere Gordon Childe was one of the first to explore and expand this concept of the relationships between cultures especially in the context of prehistoric Europe. By the 1920s sufficient archaeological material had been excavated and studied to suggest that diffusionism was not the only mechanism through which change occurred. Influenced by the political upheaval of the inter-war period Childe then argued that revolutions had wrought major changes in past societies. He conjectured a Neolithic Revolution, which inspired people to settle and farm rather than hunt nomadically. This would have led to considerable changes in social organisation, which Childe argued led to a second Urban Revolution that created the first cities. Such macro-scale thinking was in itself revolutionary and Childe's ideas are still widely admired and respected.

==== Historical particularism (c. 1880 - 1940) ====
Franz Boas argued that cultures were unique entities shaped by a unique sequence of events. As a result, there was no universal standard by which one culture could be compared with another. This line of thought combined with John Lubbock's concept that Western civilization would overwhelm and eventually destroy primitive cultures resulted in anthropologists recording mountains of information on primitive peoples before they vanished.

==== National archaeology (c. 1916 - present) ====
National archaeology used cultural-historical concepts to instill pride and raise the morale of certain nationalities or racial groups and in many countries it remains the dominant method of archaeology.

==== Soviet archaeology (1917 - present) ====
Adapting some of the concepts of Darwinian natural selection for use outside of the discipline of evolutionary biology while employing the Marxist historical-economic theory of dialectical materialism, Soviet archaeologists resumed the method of use-wear analysis and, beginning in the 1930s, tried to explain observed changes in the archaeological record in terms of internal social dynamics.

=== Processual archaeology ("New Archaeology") ===
In the 1960s, a number of young, primarily American archaeologists, such as Lewis Binford, rebelled against the paradigms of cultural history. They proposed a "New Archaeology", which would be more "scientific" and "anthropological". They came to see culture as a set of behavioural processes and traditions. (In time, this view gave rise to the term processual archaeology). Processualists borrowed from the exact sciences the idea of hypothesis testing and the scientific method. They believed that an archaeologist should develop one or more hypotheses about a culture under study, and conduct excavations with the intention of testing these hypotheses against fresh evidence. They had also become frustrated with the older generation's teachings through which cultures had taken precedence over the people being studied themselves. It was becoming clear, largely through the evidence of anthropology, that ethnic groups and their development were not always entirely congruent with the cultures in the archaeological record.

=== Behavioural archaeology ===
An approach to the study of archaeological materials formulated by Michael B. Schiffer in the mid-1970s that privileged the analysis of human behaviour and individual actions, especially in terms of the making, using, and disposal of material culture. In particular this focused on observing and understanding what people actually did, while refraining from considering people's thoughts and intentions in explaining that behaviour. A related area is Human behavioral ecology, which models material traces of human behaviour in terms of adaptations and optimisations.

=== Post-processual archaeology ===
In the 1980s, a new movement arose led by the British archaeologists Michael Shanks, Christopher Tilley, Daniel Miller and Ian Hodder. It questioned processualism's appeal to science and impartiality by claiming that every archaeologist is in fact biased by their personal experience and background, and thus truly scientific archaeological work is difficult or impossible. This is especially true in archaeology where experiments (excavations) cannot possibly be repeatable by others as the scientific method dictates. Exponents of this relativistic method, called post-processual archaeology, analysed not only the material remains they excavated, but also themselves, their attitudes and opinions. The different approaches to archaeological evidence which every person brings to his or her interpretation result in different constructs of the past for each individual. The benefit of this approach has been recognised in such fields as visitor interpretation, cultural resource management and ethics in archaeology as well as fieldwork. It has also been seen to have parallels with culture history. Processualists critique it, however, as without scientific merit. They point out that analysing yourself doesn't make a hypothesis any more valid, since a scientist will likely be more biased about himself than about artifacts. And even if you can't perfectly replicate digs, one should try to follow science as rigorously as possible. After all, perfectly scientific experiments can be performed on artifacts recovered or system theories constructed from dig information.

Post-processualism provided an umbrella for all those who decried the processual model of culture, which many feminist and neo-Marxist archaeologists for example believed treated people as mindless automatons and ignored their individuality.

=== Current theories ===
After the turn of the millennium archaeological theory has been characterized by a diversity of perspectives without any single dominate paradigm. The development of new scientific methods such as ancient DNA techniques and stable isotope analysis has led many archaeologists to embrace scientific approaches to archaeology that have emphasised big data sets and the study of human mobility and migration. Kristian Kristiansen coined this new embrace of science within archaeological theory as the "Third Science Revolution", and it has become one of the dominant approaches to archaeology within many European archaeology departments. In North America, colonial legacies and experiences with cultural heritage legislation such as NAGPRA has led to the popularity of community-focused and indigenous approaches archaeology, which has become an increasingly popular framework for archaeological theory within the United States.

On the other hand, some archaeologists, led by Laurent Olivier, Bjørnar Olsen, Michael Shanks, and Christopher Witmore, have argued for a "New Materialism" that focuses on the agency of objects. These archaeologists argue for an approach that takes things seriously not only as mediators in what can be said about the past, but also in terms of the unique ways they hold on to actions, events, or changes. For them, archaeology is less the study of the past through its material remains, than the study of things themselves with an aim to generate diverse pasts in the present. (Many archaeologists refer to this movement as symmetrical archaeology, asserting an intellectual kinship with the work of Bruno Latour and others). The "New Materialist" approach has been met with considerable criticism, with some archaeologists suggesting that it is the result of a colonialist legacy, while others question whether or not objects can have agency.

== Global scope ==
This divergence of archaeological theory has not progressed identically in all parts of the world where archaeology is conducted or in the many sub-fields of the discipline. Traditional heritage attractions often retain an ostensibly straightforward Culture History element in their interpretation material whilst university archaeology departments provide an environment to explore more abstruse methods of understanding and explaining the past. Australian archaeologists, and many others who work with indigenous peoples whose ideas of heritage differ from western concepts, have embraced post-processualism. Professional archaeologists in the United States however are predominantly processualist and this last approach is common in other countries where commercial Cultural Resources Management is practised.

== Development ==
In 1973, David Clarke of Cambridge University published an academic paper in Antiquity claiming that as a discipline, archaeology had moved from its original "noble innocence" through to "self-consciousness" and then onto "critical self-consciousness", a symptom of which was the increasing recognition and emphasis on archaeological theory. As a result, he argued, archaeology had suffered a "loss of innocence" as archaeologists became sceptical of the work of their forebears.

== The impact of ideology ==
Archaeology has been and remains a cultural, gender and political battlefield. Many groups have tried to use archaeology to prove some current cultural or political point. Marxist or Marxist-influenced archaeologists in the USSR and the UK (among others) often try to prove the truth of dialectical materialism or to highlight the past (and present) role of conflict between interest groups (e.g. male vs. female, elders vs. juniors, workers vs. owners) in generating social change. Some contemporary cultural groups have tried, with varying degrees of success, to use archaeology to prove their historic right to ownership of an area of land. Many schools of archaeology have been patriarchal, assuming that in prehistory men produced most of the food by hunting, and women produced little nutrition by gathering; more recent studies have exposed the inadequacy of many of these theories. Non-white cultural groups and experiences of racism in the past are under-represented in the archaeological literature. Some used the "Great Ages" theory implicit in the three-age system to argue continuous upward progress by Western civilisation. Much contemporary archaeology is influenced by neo-Darwinian evolutionary thought, phenomenology, postmodernism, agency theory, cognitive science, functionalism, gender-based and Feminist archaeology and Systems theory.
