= Normative model of culture =

Theoretical approach to ancient cultures

The normative model of culture is the central model in culture history, a theoretical approach to cultures in archaeology, anthropology and history. In essence it defines culture as a set of shared ideas, or norms.

The normative model was the dominant model in archaeological theory up to the rise of processual archaeology. Some argue that current views of culture history are simplified and attack a straw man.

== Basic assumptions ==
The normative model of culture assumes that a culture consists of a set of norms. These norms are ideas on all aspects of a society. It then goes on to assume that the norms are expressed in material remains of a society. A simple example of this is the norm that human remains should be buried in a cemetery outside the settlement. This norm is expressed in the material record, and can be discovered by archaeologists who excavate a field of burials outside a settlement of the same period.

As a consequence of the assumption that cultural norms were expressed in material remains, the normative model equates an archaeological culture with a human culture. By no means all traits are required to be similar for a site to be considered part of a certain larger culture. A site can lack a typical form of architecture, yet present numerous other characteristic traits (such as a particular style of pottery) that identify it as a society that was part of a larger cultural sphere.

== Criticism ==
The normative model is often criticized as being mainly descriptive. It does not explain why a certain cultural norm exists, but rather describes that it exists. The normative model fitted well with an archaeology which was largely concerned with simply collecting data.

Criticism focussed mainly on the model's lacking abilities to explain rather than describe, to generalize rather than particularize and to understand change in societies.
