= William A. Longacre =

American archaeologist

William A. Longacre II (December 16, 1937 - November 18, 2015) was an American archaeologist and one of the founders of the processual "New Archaeology" of the 1960s.

== Early life ==
Bill Longacre grew up in Houghton, Michigan. His father was William A. Longacre, a physics professor at Michigan Technological University; his mother was Doris Longacre.

== Education ==
Longacre received his bachelor's degree in anthropology from the University of Illinois in Urbana, Illinois, having transferred from the College of Mining and Technology (which is now Michigan Technological University). In 1963, he completed his doctorate in anthropology at the University of Chicago.

== Academic career ==
The year following his PhD, he was hired as an assistant professor of anthropology at the University of Arizona (UA). He led the UA Archaeological Field School at Grasshopper Pueblo, AZ from 1964-1978 and supervised over 20 doctoral students over the span of his career there. In 1989, he became head of the department and in 1998 the Fred A. Riecker Distinguished Professor.

His most famous published work was Anthropology as Archaeology: A Case Study, published in 1970. A novel work, this research "reconstructed prehistoric social organization at a 12th to mid-13th century AD Ancestral Pueblo community in eastern Arizona," at a site known as Carter Ranch Pueblo. This work is an example of the New Archaeology (now called Processual Archaeology) theory.

In 1973, Longacre started a long-term ethnoarchaeological research program studying pottery use, reuse, and discard among the Kalinga of northern Luzon, Philippines. The Kalinga Ethnoarchaeological Project lasted for almost 20 years, continuing to influence archaeological practice.

Longacre retired from the University of Arizona in 2004, but continued to hold a visiting professor teaching appointment at the University of the Philippines until 2008.

== Awards ==
- SAA Award for Excellence in Ceramic Research
- UA Raymond H. Thompson Award (posthumous)

== Selected publications ==
Longacre, William A. 1964. “Archaeology as Anthropology: A Case Study,” Science 144:1454–1455.

Longacre, William A. 1966. “Changing Patterns of Social Integration: A Prehistoric Example from the American Southwest,” American Anthropologist 68(1):94–102

Longacre, William A. 1970a. “Archaeology as Anthropology: A Case Study,” Anthropological Papers 17. Tucson: University of Arizona Press.

Longacre, William A., ed. 1970b. Reconstructing Prehistoric Pueblo Societies. Albuquerque: University of New Mexico Press.

Longacre, William A. 1973. “Current Directions in Southwestern Archaeology,” Annual Review of Anthropology 2:201–219.

Longacre, William A. 2010. “Archaeology as Anthropology Revisited,” Journal of Archaeological Method and Theory 17(2): 81–100.

Longacre, William A., ed. 1991. Ceramic Ethnoarchaeology. Tucson: University of Arizona Press.

Longacre, William A., Sally J. Holbrook, and Michael W. Graves, eds. 1982. “Multidisciplinary Research at Grasshopper Pueblo, Arizona,” Anthropological Papers 40. Tucson: University of Arizona Press.

Longacre, William A., and James M. Skibo, eds. 1994. Kalinga Ethnoarchaeology: Expanding Archaeological Method and Theory. Washington, DC: Smithsonian Institution Press.

Skibo, James M., Miriam T. Stark, and Michael W. Graves, eds. 2007. Archaeological Anthropology: Perspectives on Method and Theory. Tucson: University of Arizona Press. (publication based on a symposium on Longacre's impact on archaeology)
