= Zooarchaeology =

Analysis of animal remains found in archaeological sites

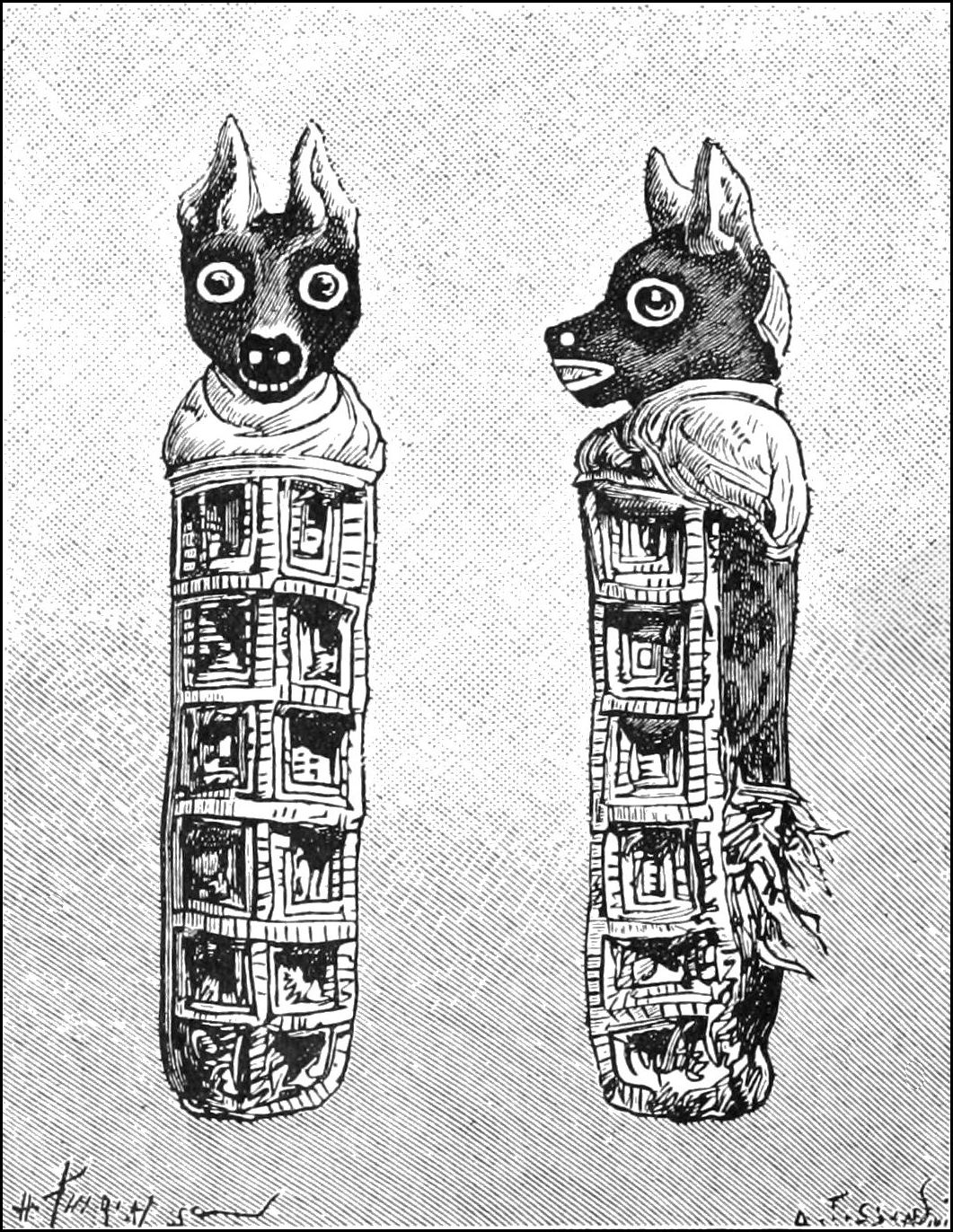
Illustration of an Egyptian mummy of a dog

Zooarchaeology or archaeozoology merges the disciplines of zoology and archaeology, focusing on the analysis of animal remains within archaeological sites. This field, managed by specialists known as zooarchaeologists or faunal analysts, examines remnants such as bones, shells, hair, chitin, scales, hides, proteins, and DNA, to derive insights into historical human-animal interactions and environmental conditions. While bones and shells tend to be relatively more preserved in archaeological contexts, the survival of faunal remains is generally infrequent. The degradation or fragmentation of faunal remains presents challenges in the accurate analysis and interpretation of data.

Characterized by its interdisciplinary nature, zooarchaeology bridges the studies of ancient human societies and the animal kingdom. Practitioners, from various scientific backgrounds including anthropology, paleontology, and ecology, aim primarily to identify and understand human interactions with animals and their environments. Through the analysis of faunal remains, zooarchaeologists can gain insight into past diets, domestication practices, tool usage, and ritualistic behaviors, thus contributing to a comprehensive view of human-environment interactions and the sub-field of environmental archaeology.

== Development ==
The development of zooarchaeology in eastern North America can be broken up into three different periods. The first being the Formative period starting around the 1860s, the second being the Systematization period beginning in the early 1950s, and lastly the Integration period which began about 1969. Full-time zooarchaeologists came to be during the Systematization period. Prior to the Systemization period, it was just a technique that was applied but not specifically studied.

Zooarchaeological specialists started to come about partly because of a new approach to archaeology known as processual archaeology. This approach puts more emphasis on explaining why things happened, not just what happened. Archaeologists began to specialize in zooarchaeology, and their numbers increased.

== Uses ==
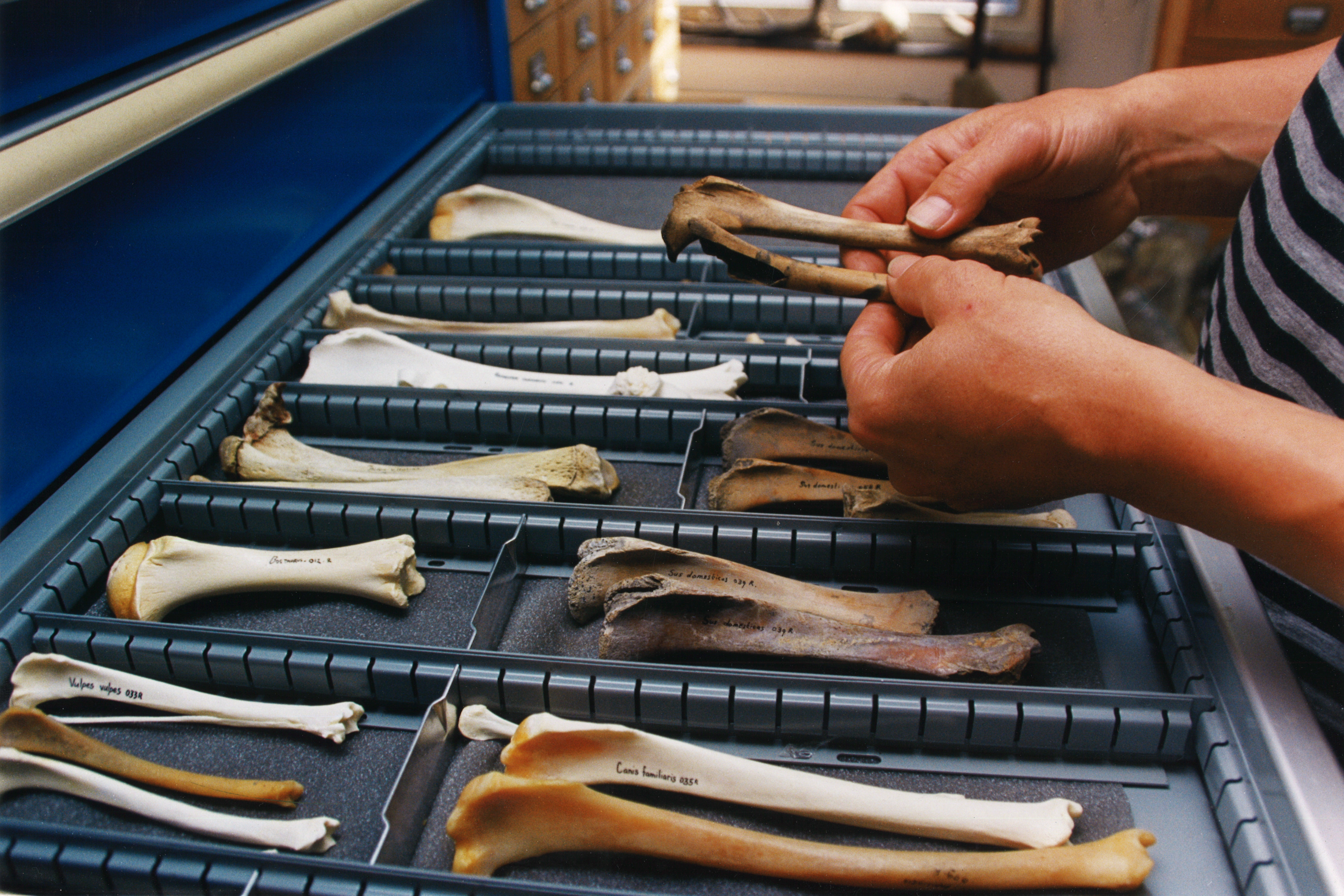
A reference collection of shinbones (Tibia) of different animal species helps determining old bones. Dutch Heritage Agency.

One important aspect of zooarchaeology is using morphological and genetic evidence to answer questions zooarchaeologists have about the relationship between animals and humans. These questions include:

1. What was the diet like, and in what ways were the animals used for food?
2. Which animals were eaten, in what amounts, and with what other foods?
3. Who were the ones to obtain the food, and did the availability of that food depend on age or gender?
4. How was culture, such as technologies and behavior, influenced by and associated with diet?
5. How can faunal remains identify social differences such as class or ethnicity?
6. What purposes, other than food, were animals used for?
7. What was the environment like?
8. How did hunter-gatherers collect food?
9. How have human populations changed over time?
10. How have humans domesticated animals over time?
11. How do modern animals compare to animals of the past, and how does this give context to human populations who interacted/still interact with those animals?

Another important aspect of zooarchaeology is its application to the migration patterns of humans. In areas where people are either closely tied to animal as companions or regularly follow the migrations of herds, the data collected from these animals can help give context to human movement as well. Studying animal remains can also give context to other remains and artifacts found in association with them.

== Faunal remains ==
Faunal remains are parts of animals that have been left in the material record, which archaeologists study. These remains are important to the record because they can show cultural practices, such as what food they were eating, based on the remains left behind. Zooarcheologists can find out information like the species the animal is, the age the animal was when it died, and what its sex was.

Some common faunal remains found at sites include, as stated above, bones, shells, hair, chitin, scales, hides, proteins and DNA. These are often found in piles of waste left behind. This means zooarchaeology is part of the general study of waste or garbology. Archaeologists may have to sort through and identify the species and body region of faunal remains. The types of fauna that leave behind these remains will depend on where the archaeological site is located. These animals can be domesticated or wild, and sometimes they find both types of remains at sites.

In addition to helping us understand the past, zooarchaeology can also help us to improve the present and the future. Studying how people dealt with animals, and their effects can help avoid many potential ecological problems. This specifically includes problems involving wildlife management. For example, one of the questions that wildlife preservationists ask is whether they should keep animals facing extinction in several smaller areas, or in one larger area. Based on zooarchaeological evidence, they found that animals that are split up into several smaller areas are more likely to go extinct.

== Techniques ==
=== Taphonomy ===
One of the issues to which zooarchaeologists pay close attention is taphonomy. Techniques used in the study of taphonomy include researching how items are buried and deposited at an archaeological site, what the conditions are that aid in the preservation of these items, and how these items get destroyed, all a part of what is referred to by archaeologist Michael Brian Schiffer as behavioral archaeology. One important aspect of taphonomy is assessing how a specimen became damaged; Understanding the taphonomy of a faunal assemblage can explain how and why bones were damaged. One source of damage to animal bones is humans. Cut marks on animal bones provide evidence for butchering or bone working. Fractures, such as by percussion impact and spiral fracture on a bone can suggest that it was processed by humans for its marrow, minerals, and nutrients. Other human processes that affect bones include burning and damage from archaeological excavations. Non-human damage to bones includes interspecies damage, damage from raptors and scavengers, damage from rodents, damage from fungi and root etching, environmental weathering, and polishing. Distinguishing different types of damage to animal bones is a tedious and complex process that requires background in multiple scientific fields. Some of the physical damage on bones can be seen with the naked eye, but a lens with 10x magnification and good lighting is necessary for seeing most damage.

=== Identification and taxonomy ===
Identification is integral to the archaeological analysis of animal remains. Identification of animal remains requires a combination of anatomy, taxonomy, and studies of archaeological context. The ability to identify a piece of bone requires knowing what element (bone in the body) it is, and to what animal the bone belongs. The latter is referred to as taxonomy, which is used to sort animals into different groups. Zooarchaeology uses Linnean nomenclature, which includes varying degrees of specificity in regards to the species. Linnaean nomenclature (Linnaean taxonomy) is used because it allows archaeologists to identify and show the genetic and morphological relationships between species. These relationships are based on species evolution, which can often be subject to interpretation. While more specific identification is preferable, it is better to be less specific in the identification rather than identify a specimen incorrectly. When examining animal remains, it is common that there are bones that are too small or too damaged to be able to accurately identify it. Archaeological context can be used to help with assumptions about species identification. Skeletal classification is the other half of properly identifying animal remains. Zoological osteology is useful to zooarchaeology because certain morphological aspects of a bone are associated with particular periods of growth, which can help narrow down the age the specimen was at death. The analysis of teeth require a slightly different approach than bone, but retain the same level of importance when it comes to analysis. The wear pattern and tooth morphology provides information about a species diet and age; the enamel also has biochemical remains of what the animal ate. While animal remains can include more than just bones and teeth, the nature of things like hair and muscle cause it to deteriorate quickly after death, leaving the skeleton behind; this is why most of zooarchaeology revolves around skeletal morphology. Laboratory analysis can include comparing the skeletons found on site with previously identified lab specimens. This not only helps to identify what the animal is, but also whether the animal was domesticated or not.

=== Genetic analysis ===
Genetic analysis using ancient DNA is an important tool used by zooarchaeologists. Genetic history of an animal can give information on population movement over time and environmental adaptations necessary to live in an area. It can also give context to how animals may or may not have been domesticated over time by a group of people. Ancient DNA is critical to the genetic analysis of animals remains. Whereas modern DNA has very long fragments in samples, ancient DNA has very short fragments, making it very easily contaminated. The extraction and sampling of ancient DNA requires highly specialized training, as well as intensive protocol to prevent it from being contaminated by modern DNA. The paper :Ancient DNA Analysis of the Oldest Canid Species from the Siberian Arctic and Genetic Contribution to the Domestic Dog" by Lee et al. gives a description of claws and teeth were sampled for ancient DNA. In a facility specially designed for ancient DNA extraction, with the use of personal protective equipment and regular bleaching of surfaces and tools, the claws and teeth were wiped with bleach to destroy all modern DNA on the surface, and were then drilled into a powder. The DNA fragments were extracted from the bone powder using an ancient DNA extraction protocol. After using several processes to replicate the DNA fragments and verify the results (PCR and gel electrophoresis), the ancient DNA from the bone powder was sequenced and then analyzed.

=== ZooMS ===
With ZooMS analysis (Zooarchaeology by Mass Spectrometry), the animal species behind a bone fragment or bone artifact can be determined even when no morphological traits survive. The method makes use of interspecies differences in the structure of collagen.

=== Quantification ===
Yet another technique zooarchaeologists use is quantification. They make interpretations based on the number and size of the faunal remains. These interpretations include how important different animals might have been to the diet. NISP (Number of Identified Specimens) is the most widely used quantification method. It is defined as a simple count that shows taxonomic abundance. It is favored for being standardized and easily replicable. However, NISP can run into issues with differential preservation and identifiability of some animals. For example, bones more prone to fragmentation will be overrepresented in an assemblage counted with NISP. Some studies will use MNI (Minimum Number of Individuals) or MNE (Minimum Number of Elements) to mitigate these issues.

== Examples from prehistory ==
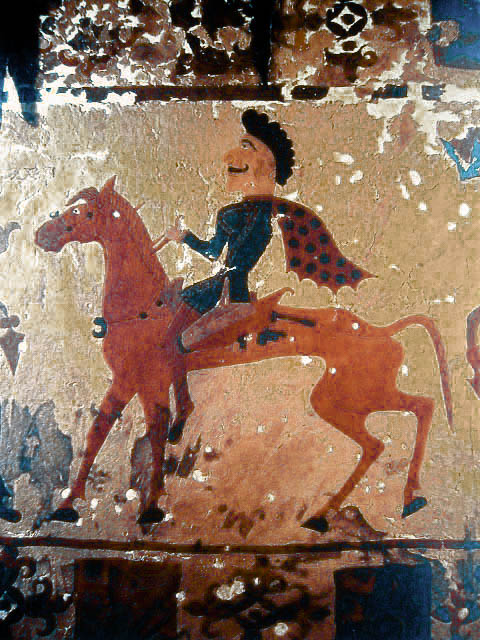
Carpet exemplifying the image of a Pazyryk horseman in 300 B.C. The Pazyryk were known as superb horsemen please see Pazyryk culture, other findings alongside the horses can be explored in Pazyryk burials.

Human-animal relationships and interactions were diverse during prehistory from being a food source to playing a more intimate role in society. Animals have been used in non-economical ways such as being part of a human burial. However, the majority of zooarchaeology has focused on who was eating what by looking at various remains such as bones, teeth, and fish scales. In the twenty-first century researchers have begun to interpret animals in prehistory in wider cultural and social patterns, focusing on how the animals have affected humans and possible animal agency. There is evidence of animals such as the mountain lion or the jaguar being used for ritualistic purposes, but not being eaten as a food source.

Analyses of faunal remains are important to show how prehistoric and hunter-gatherer civilizations interacted with the animals in their environment. This information can be used to help reconstruct Paleolithic environments. Faunal remains with cut marks, teeth marks, burns, or butchering can signify human interaction which can be important to archaeological data. Sometimes these analyses can be difficult due to decomposition and weathering, which can cause damage to the remains. Not only do faunal remains help reconstruct environments from the past they can show other cultural practices as well. These remains are not always from food, but can be found in jewelry, tools, spiritual practices, and more. This information can show the fauna located in the area of analyses, as well as cultural significance.

Animal burials date back to prehistory with examples emerging from the Mesolithic period. In Sweden at the site of Skateholm I, dogs were found buried with children under eight years old or were found buried by themselves. Some of the dogs who were buried alone have grave goods similar to their human contemporaries such as flint weapons and deer antlers. Meanwhile, during the same time period Skateholm II emerged and was very different from Skateholm I, as dogs were buried alone on the North and West boundaries of the grave area. Another burial site in Siberia near Lake Baikal known as the "Lokomotiv" cemetery had a wolf burial among human graves. Buried together with, but slightly beneath the wolf was a male human skull. The wolf breed was not native to this area as it was warm and other research for the area shows no other wolf habitation. Bazaliiskiy and Savelyev suggest that the presence and significance of the wolf could possibly reflect human interaction. Another example occurred in 300 B.C. in Pazyryk known as the Pazyryk burials where ten horses were buried alongside a human male, the horses were fully adorned with saddles, pendants, among other valuables. The oldest horse was also the horse with the grandest attachments. Erica Hill, a professor in archaeology, suggests that the burials of prehistory animals can shed light on human-animal relationships.

== Related fields ==
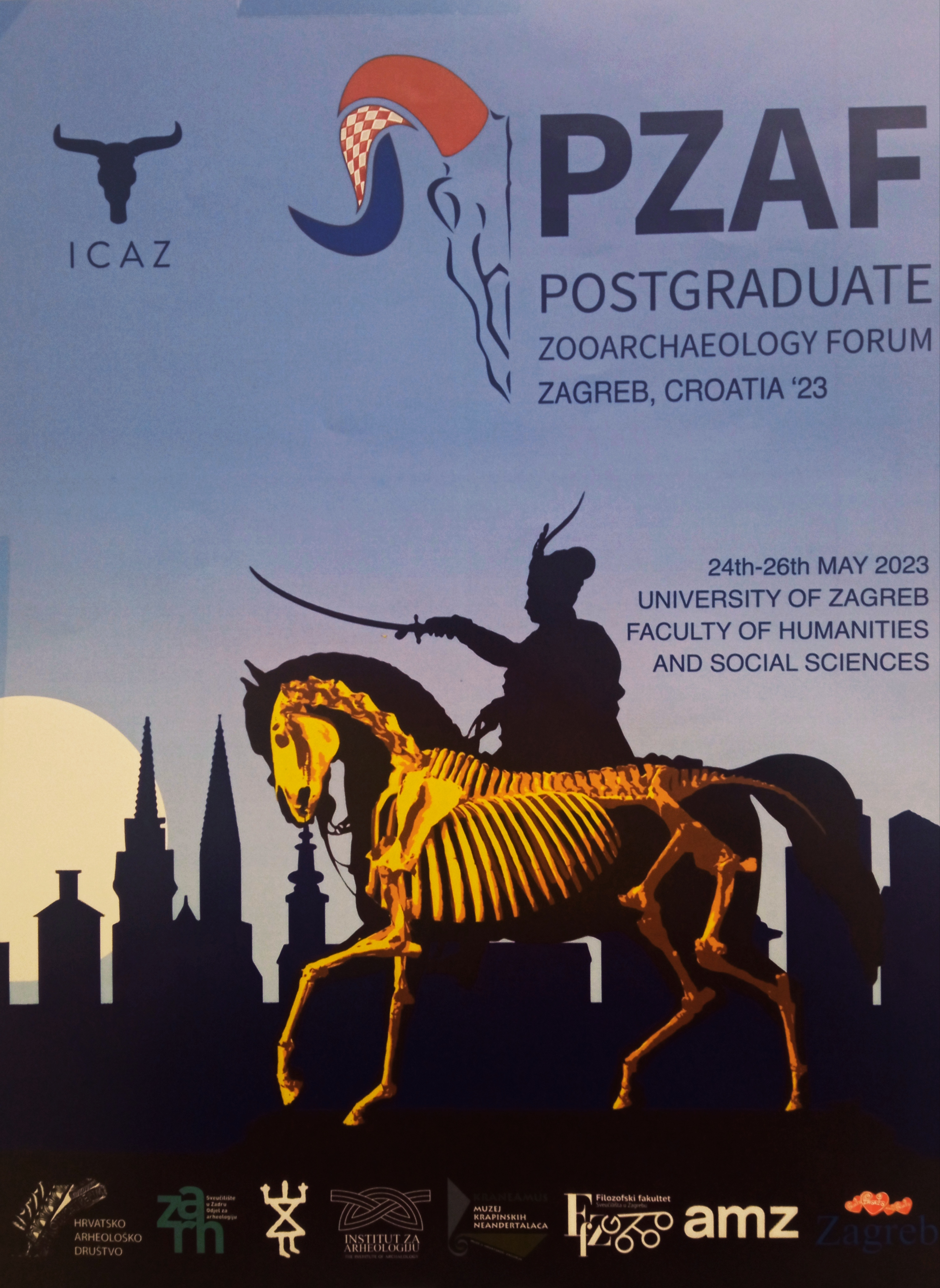
Poster of the Zooarchaeology forum in Zagreb (2023)

Zooarchaeology overlaps significantly with other areas of study. These include:

- Agricultural science
- Anthropology
- Anthrozoology
- Archaeology
- Biology
- Ecology
- Ethnography
- Garbology
- Geology
- Paleopathology
- Palaeontology
- Paleozoology
- Veterinarian
- Zoology

=== Wider areas of study ===
Such analyses provide the basis by which further interpretations can be made. Topics that have been addressed by zooarchaeologists include:

- Animal husbandry
- Belief systems
- Cultural exchange
- Diet and nutrition
- Disease
- Domestication
- Environment and environmental change
- Ethnicity
- Food processing
- Landscape
- Material culture
- Pastoralism
- Seasonality
- Social status
- Subsistence strategies
- Technology
