= Journal of Archaeological Method and Theory =

- Discipline: Archaeology
- Language: English
- Edited by: Valentine Roux; Margaret E. Beck

Publication details
- Former name(s): Advances in Archaeological Method and Theory, Archaeological Method and Theory, Journal of Archaeological Method and Theory
- History: 1978–present
- Publisher: Springer Science+Business Media
- Frequency: Quarterly
- Open access: Hybrid
- Impact factor: 2.828 (2019)

Standard abbreviations
- ISO 4: J. Archaeol. Method Theory

Indexing
- ISSN: 1072-5369 (print); 1573-7764 (web)
- LCCN: 2004233369
- JSTOR: 10431691
- OCLC no.: 44162171

Links
- Journal homepage

The Journal of Archaeological Method and Theory is a peer-reviewed academic journal which focuses on methodology and theory in archaeology. It is published quarterly by Springer Science+Business Media.

The journal originated in an annual edited volume series, Advances in Archaeological Method and Theory, established by Michael Schiffer in 1978. The purpose of the series was to publish review articles covering current issues in archaeological theory. It was published by Academic Press between 1978 and 1987, and by Plenum Press between 1989 and 1993 as Archaeological Method and Theory. The series moved to a quarterly journal format in 1994, in order to expand its scope from reviews to other types of papers. Schiffer continued as editor until 2000. From 2000 to 2018, it was edited by Catherine M. Cameron and James M. Skibo. The current editors are Valentine Roux and Margaret E. Beck.

The journal is often associated with the processual, behavioural, and evolutionary schools of archaeological theory, but aims to "welcome 'all theoretical archaeology'". For example, a landmark paper by Ian Hodder, which established the name post-processual archaeology for the theoretical reaction to processual archaeology he led in the early 1980s, was published in volume 8 of Advances in Archaeological Method and Theory.

In 2016 a special issue of the journal was dedicated to papers that challenged a binary approach to gender, which included perspectives from queer and transgender archaeologies.

== Abstracting and indexing ==
The journal is abstracted and indexed in the Arts and Humanities Citation Index, Scopus, Social Sciences Citation Index, Academic Search, International Bibliography of Periodical Literature, International Bibliography of the Social Sciences, Periodicals Index Online, and Anthropological Literature. According to the Journal Citation Reports, the journal has a 2019 impact factor of 2.828, ranking it 10th out of 91 journals in the category "anthropology".
