= Fyssen Foundation =

French foundation

- Fondation Fyssen
- Formation: March 20, 1979; 47 years ago
- Founder: Héraclios Fyssen
- Type: Nonprofit
- Legal status: Foundation
- Headquarters: Paris
- Official language: English, French
- Président, Board of Directors and Scientific Committee: Daniel Lallier
- Main organ: Annales de la Fondation Fyssen
- Award: International Scientific Prize
- Website: Official website

Annales de la Fondation Fyssen
- Discipline: Animal and human cognition
- Language: English, French

Publication details
- History: 1986-present
- Publisher: Fondation Fyssen (France)
- Frequency: Annual
- Open access: Yes

Standard abbreviations
- ISO 4: Ann. Fond. Fyssen

Indexing
- ISSN: 0980-157X (print); 2804-3758 (web)
- OCLC no.: 230709540

Links
- Journal homepage

The Fyssen Foundation (French: Fondation Fyssen) is a French charitable organization that was established in 1979 by Héraclios Fyssen, a wealthy industrialist who endowed his whole fortune to it. The aim of the foundation is to stimulate research into the processes underlying and leading to cognition, including work in such disciplines as ethology, paleontology, archaeology, anthropology, psychology, logic, and neuroscience. To this end, the foundation offers postdoctoral stipends to French scientists wanting to do research abroad and foreign scientists wishing to work in a French laboratory. Reports on this research are published in the foundation's journal, the Annales de la Fondation Fyssen. It also offers research grants. In addition, the foundation regularly organizes symposia and supports the publication in book form of the proceedings thereof. Finally, the foundation yearly awards an International Scientific Prize of €100,000. The topics of this prize rotate among the different fields of interest to the foundation. As of 2023, the foundation has supported over 1300 scientists with either a stipend or a research grant, awarded 43 International Scientific Prizes, and supported the publication of 45 books.

== List of International Scientific Prize awardees ==
The following persons have received the International Scientific Prize:

- André Leroi-Gourhan (1980)
- William H. Thorpe (1981)
- Vernon B. Mountcastle (1982)
- Harold C. Conklin (1983)
- Roger W. Brown (1984)
- Pierre Buser (1985)
- David Pilbeam (1986)
- David Premack (1987)
- Jean-Claude Gardin (1988)
- Patricia S. Goldman-Rakic (1989)
- Jack Goody (1990)
- George A. Miller (1991)
- Pasko Rakic (1992)
- L. Luca Cavalli-Sforza (1993)
- Lila R. Gleitman (1994)
- William D. Hamilton (1995)
- Colin Renfrew (1996)
- Michel Jouvet (1997)
- Alan Walker (1998)
- Brent Berlin (1999)
- Joaquin Fuster (2000)
- Peter Marler (2001)
- Philip Johnson-Laird (2002)
- Michael I. Posner (2003)
- Michael Tomasello (2004)
- Joseph E. LeDoux (2005)
- Lewis Binford (2006)
- Randolf Menzel (2007)
- Simha Arom (2008)
- Chris Frith (2009)
- Amotz Zahavi (2010)
- Fred Gage (2011)
- Hélène Roche (2012)
- Renée Baillargeon (2013)
- Geoffrey Lloyd (2014)
- Roger Lemon (2015)
- Ian Hodder (2016)
- Joël Fagot (2017)
- Silvia Arber (2018)
- Richard G. Morris (2019)
- Valentine Roux (2020)
- Jean-Jacques Hublin and Svante Pääbo (2021)
- Joshua Tenenbaum (2022)
- Pascal Boyer (2023)
