= Behavioural archaeology =

Archaeological theory

Behavioural archaeology is an archaeological theory that expands upon the nature and aims of archaeology in regards to human behaviour and material culture. The theory was first published in 1975 by American archaeologist Michael B. Schiffer and his colleagues J. Jefferson Reid, and William L. Rathje. The theory proposes four strategies that answer questions about past, and present cultural behaviour. It is also a means for archaeologists to observe human behaviour and the archaeological consequences that follow.

The theory was developed as a reaction to changes in archaeological thought, and expanding archaeological practise during the mid-late 20th century. It reacted to the increasing number of sub-disciplines emerging within archaeology as each came with their own unique methodologies. The theory was also a reaction to the processual thought process that emerged within the discipline some years prior.

In recent years the use of behavioural archaeology has been regarded as a significant contribution to the archaeological community. The strategies outlined by Schiffer and his colleagues have developed into sub-disciplines or methodologies that are used and well-regarded in contemporary archaeological practise. Behavioural archaeology has positive effects on the method in which archaeologists use to reconstruct human behaviour.

== Background ==
"This diversification of research interests is so far-reaching that it compels us to ask fundamental questions about what we are doing, why we are doing it, and how it relates to what others are doing. We contend that the expansion of archaeology into little-explored domains is an expectable outcome of several long-term processes operating in the discipline. Clearly, these processes are leading to an expanded conception of the nature and aims of archaeology. Archaeology has not ceased to exist as an organized discipline; it is merely reorganizing into a new configuration"

— Michael Brian Schiffer, 1975.

"Behavioural Archaeology" was first published by Michael B. Schiffer, J. Jefferson Reid, and William L. Rathje in 1975 in the American Anthropologist journal. Leading up to the publication, archaeology as a discipline was expanding in its practice and theory due to the specialisation of various areas and new ideas that were being presented to the community.

Archaeology was beginning to break up into various sub-disciplines such as ethnoarchaeology, experimental archaeology, and industrial archaeology. Furthermore, Michael Schiffer challenges notions of processual archaeology (or 'New' archaeology) which was introduced prior within the discipline. The paper aimed to address the gaps within the processualist tradition and improve idea presented in processual archaeology, particularly those by James N. Hill and William A. Longacre. Rather than a paradigm shift occurring with the published paper into a new standard thought process within archaeology, Behavioural archaeology became one of many ideas within a vast and expanding theoretical landscape.

Through behavioural archaeology, Michael Schiffer and his colleagues explain the aims and nature of archaeology in relation to the new theories and forms of archaeology that were emerging during this time. They show that the fundamental concepts of archaeology can be represented as the relations between material culture and human behaviour. By examining these relationships and asking questions surrounding them, archaeologists can answer questions about human behavioural change for the past, present, and future.

== Theory ==
The theory of behavioural archaeology outlines four strategies in which human behaviour and material culture can be examined in order to answer questions associated with archaeological inquiry. Behavioural archaeology also defines archaeology as a discipline that transcends time and space as it is the study of not only the past, but also of the present and future. It distinguishes the differences between systematic and archaeological contexts and examines how the archaeological record can be distorted through cultural and non-cultural transformation processes. Michael Schiffer stresses the importance of analysing the formation processes at various sites. This allows archaeologists to discern the most appropriate line of questioning regarding the material culture and how it relates to human behaviour.

=== Strategies ===
==== Strategy 1 ====
Strategy 1 as outlined by Michael Schiffer and his colleagues examines how material culture from a past society or cultural group can be used to answer questions about past behaviour. These questions can include ones that involve the population of specific peoples, the occupation of a certain site or the resources that were used by humans at a certain location. For example, when studying the changes in technology of past societies, inferences regarding changes in diet of individuals can be made.

==== Strategy 2 ====
Strategy 2 looks at how present material culture can provide archaeologists with information regarding past human behaviour. Questions within this strategy become experimentally charged as they are not confined to a specific time. Due to the nature of this questioning, this strategy relates to the sub-disciplines of experimental archaeology and ethnoarchaeology. During the time in which this theory was developed, experimental archaeology was being tested. However, in the 21st-century experimental archaeology has undergone further testing and is seen as a useful means of enquiry about the past within archaeological practise. It is often used to recreate the practises and technologies of past societies in order to understand how they operated and the strategic decisions made.

==== Strategy 3 ====
Strategy 3 concerns itself with studying past material culture in order to answer questions about present human behaviour. Questions include how humans adapt to population changes, such as storage facilities and societal organisation. The past is often seen to be separate from the present, however, Michael Schiffer challenges this by examining how ancient cultures are relevant to modern social problems and issues. This theme of social relevance to contemporary society is inspired by the writings of Paul S. Martin. Most notably, Martin is credited with the theory known as the 'overkill hypothesis' theorising that humans lead to the rapid extinction of prehistoric animals. Although this theory is considered to be controversial, this can be seen as an example of how humans adapt to rising population, a situation that plagues modern society. This strategy can be seen today through the archaeological practise of ethnoarchaeology.

==== Strategy 4 ====
Strategy 4 examines present-day material culture to examine contemporary human behaviour. This strategy seeks to ask specific questions about ongoing societies such as the consumption of goods by certain groups of people. This strategy can be studied in relation to industrial and non-industrial societies, however, is particularly useful for industrial societies. Additionally, this strategy is useful as by studying present material culture, archaeologists may also be able to look into future human behaviour. Strategy 4 is able to explain many modern behavioural patterns are also promote the relevance of archaeology in a 21st-century society.

=== Debates ===
With the introduction of a new theory within the archaeological community there comes a series of debates around how the ideas need to be interpreted. Michael Schiffer and his colleagues initially believed that behavioural archaeology would become a unifying principle for archaeological practise. However it has become one of many theories within archaeology. Behavioural archaeology has often been compared to other theories such as processual and evolutionary archaeology as reacts to ideas within these theories and is often compared to them when analysed in practise.

In this sense not all archaeologists believe it is a revolutionary practise, and many believe that similar to other archaeological theories they should be used in conjunction with each other when practising archaeology.

In 2010 the Society for American Archaeology held a forum concerning 'Assessing Michael B. Schiffer and his Behavioral Archaeology. At this forum, researchers such as Michael J. O'Brien, Alexander Bentley, Robert L. Kelly, Linda S. Cordell, Stephen Plog, and Diane Gifford-Gonzales discussed and raised issues about behavioural archaeology. In 2011 Michael Schiffer responded to these issues after they were published, by clarifying and addressing these points.

== Applications in archaeology ==
Behavioural archaeology can be applied in many different contexts and situations in archaeological practice. It encourages archaeologists to examine an idea that may not be concrete such as belief systems, gender relations, or power relations. When these ideas are studied in conjunction with material culture, human behaviour and experience within various societies is revealed. For example, when examining changes within technology in the archaeological record, inferences can be made surrounding diet, environmental and social factors within human society.

In particular Strategies 2 and 4 have significant applications within modern archaeology although Strategies 1 and 3 are also generally applied.

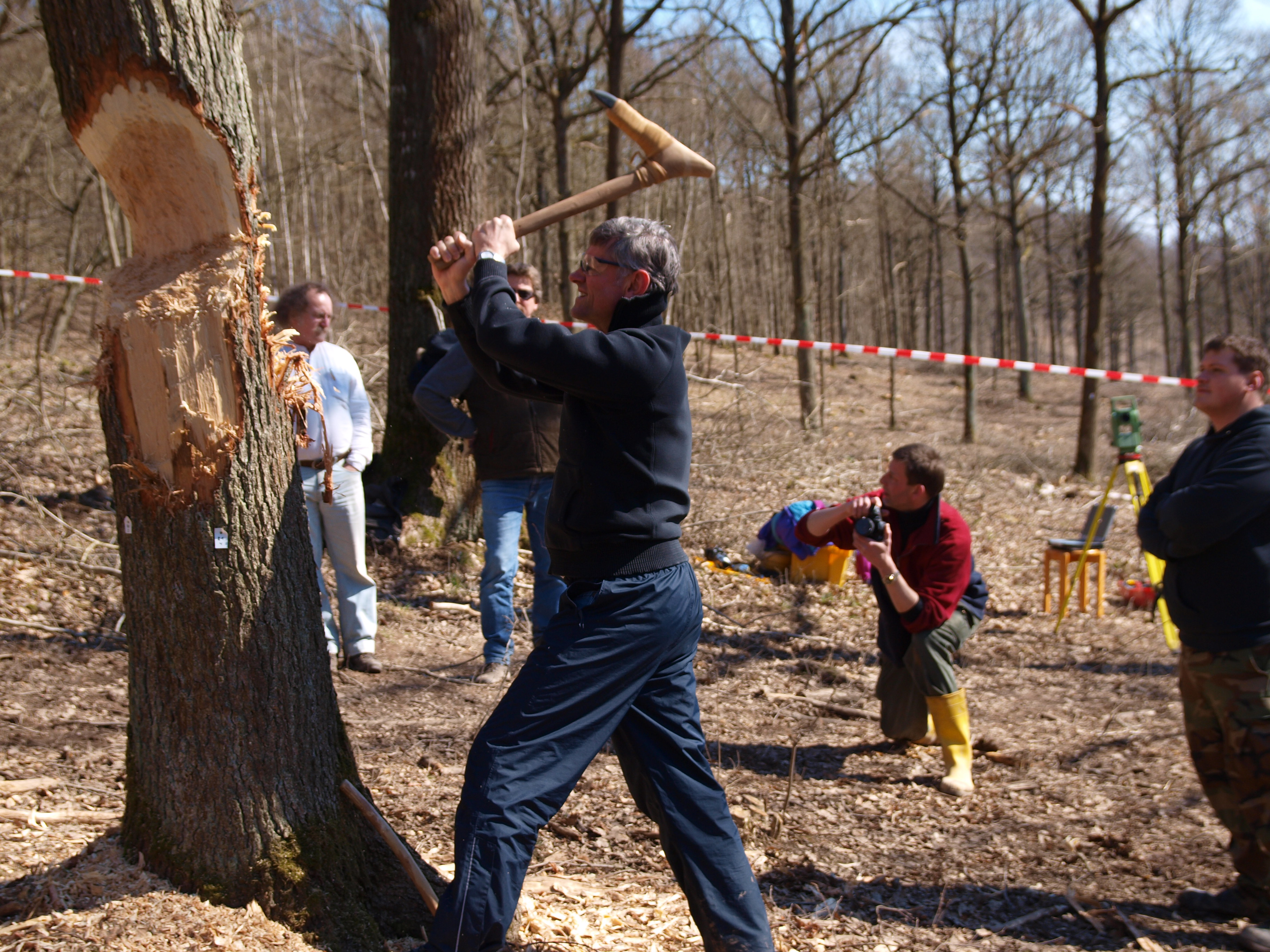
Experimental tree felling at Ergersheim Experiments 2011

=== Strategy 2 ===
Strategy 2 also known as experimental archaeology, has developed within archaeological practise into a sub-discipline. Experimental archaeology allows an assumption of what occurred in the past to become an inference of what may have actually occurred. Although this concept is not a new idea in archaeological thought, since Michael Schiffer's 1975 paper, experimental archaeology has increasingly become an important subdiscipline within archaeology. Schiffer himself in 1990 and 1987 conducted research surrounding the properties of ceramics in order to understand the decisions of craftsmen when creating these objects. Experimental archaeology surrounding ceramics can be recreating furnaces and vessels in order to see how craftsmen made decisions surrounding the manufacture of ceramic products. Experiments such as this allow archaeologists to have a greater understanding of past human behaviour.

=== Strategy 4 ===
Strategy 4 is currently being used in practise today particularly in America by William Rathje, one of the original authors of the theory. In the 1970s Rathje began the Garbage Project in Tucson, Arizona. In this project Rathje and his students examined the waste of Tucson locals in order to answer questions regarding human consumption, and decomposition of waste. Through this, they were able to examine human behaviour and make comparisons between what people claim their behaviour is against their actual consumption behaviour. For example, individuals claimed they drank less beer when they were actually consuming more of the substance. This analysis of human behaviour and consumption is useful when examining consumption in industrial societies and predicting future consumption behaviours.

=== Pompeii Premise ===
The 'Pompeii Premise' is an idea that was first proposed by Robert Ascher in 1961 that the remains an archaeologist uncovers is the representation of a group of people frozen at a certain point in time, and that inferences can only be made by the archaeologist when a site has assemblages like those at Pompeii. However rather than seeing the archaeological record as a 'preserved past', it is a combination of material culture over various points in time.

Lewis Binford suggests using the methods of behavioural archaeology in order to avoid viewing material culture in this stagnant way. One method of this is understanding the formation processes and context surrounding the creation of the archaeological record. In this respect, it is important for the archaeologist to remember the difference between the archaeological context and the systematic context of the archaeological record. In this way, cultural and non-cultural transformation processes can be determined and aid the archaeologist in determining if there is any distortion of context within the record. Within cultural transformation processes, human behaviour can be determined as it directly affects the formation of the material culture at a site.

== Behavioural archaeology and memory ==
The concept of memory is something so pivotal for those in archaeology. It is through memory itself that an artifact can be understood. Laurent Olivier wrote "[t]he subject of archaeology is nothing other than this imprint of the past inscribed in matter." If that is all archaeology is, then the goal would be how to properly find and later portray this particular "imprint" for everyone to know about the artifact. With Behavioural Archaeology, the imprint in question is with certain artifacts, how exactly a human or multiple reacted to and with the artifact being analyzed.

Olivier also states "[f]undamentally, [archaeology] is an investigation into archives of memory, which is what remains are. Behavioural Archaeology takes the remains found by individuals and then further analyzes their meanings and what possible meanings they held for the humans that they interacted.

For example, in Bonna D. Wescoat's book, lamps found in different archaeological excavation sites "have been taken to confirm nocturnal timing". There was much discussion and deliberation before the academic community as a whole agreed that what was found was a lamp and that its function was to act as a light-bringer during the night. As such, some artifacts hold a singular, clear meaning while others found in excavation may hold multiple uses or were used in ways that the excavators cannot fathom as they were not there in the time when the artifact held much relevance. Memory should always be used in conjunction with behavioral archaeology for memory dictates how an object is seen.

== Contributions to archaeology ==
The introduction of behavioural archaeology in 1975 followed by the work of Michael Schiffer and his students has been seen as a significant contribution to the field of archaeology. All four strategies have been significant in expanding the thought process surrounding material culture and human behaviour in various contexts. Furthermore, due to the significance of Behavioral archaeology, it is often used with other archaeological schools of thought when analysing the archaeological record. The act of looking at the relationships between material culture and human behaviour in itself is a significant thought process. In 2010 Society for American Archaeology held a forum in which archaeologists significant to the American archaeological community discussed the contributions of Michael Schiffer and Behavioral archaeology.

Behavioural archaeology is significant as it explores concepts that allow the archaeological record to characterised in terms of context and formation processes. This allows archaeologists to understand variations of different contexts in order to answer questions of inquiry.

It has also made contributions to archaeology as it looks at the creation of the archaeological record over time. This emphasises the fundamental idea of understanding a variety of contexts when examining material culture. This is an idea that was overlooked by processual thinking as processualism did not define specific contexts. Behavioral archaeology fills this gap in order to have a more thorough understanding of the archaeological record.

Behavioural archaeology supports the idea that the scientific process is a fundamental part of archaeological practise. This comes as a reaction to the introduction of postmodern ideas to archaeology and archaeological thought. As the idea of forming a narrative from the archaeological record became common, Behavioral archaeology stresses the importance of using the scientific process in order to construct a sound analysis.

Additionally, it is significant to archaeology as it places importance on creating principles or establishing relationships between human behaviour and material culture. This process is vital to archaeological practise as it allows archaeologists to identify patterns within material culture, and examine the archaeological record across cultures.

Overall behavioural archaeology challenges archaeologists to reconsider how they conduct archaeological practise and how they think about the nature and aims of archaeology.
