= Valentine Roux =

French archaeologist

- Born: 1956 (age 69–70); Belleville-sur-Saône, France
- Education: University of Paris
- Occupation: Archaeologist

Valentine Roux (born 1956) is a French archaeologist specialising in ceramic production in the Levant between the 5th and 2nd millennium BCE with the aim of identifying the "evolutionary trajectories of ceramic traditions."

== Education and career ==
Roux was born in Belleville-sur-Saône in 1956. She studied prehistory at the University of Paris and obtained her doctorate in 1983. Her thesis was on the ethnoarchaeology of grinding material in Neolithic Mauritania.

She has been affiliated with the CNRS since 1986, and was appointed a research director there in 2003.

Roux's research "combines ethnoarchaeology in India and archaeology in the Near East." She has devoted much research to developing "reference frameworks, whether about the diagnostic attributes of manufacturing techniques, their properties, the quantification of their constitutive components, the cognitive and motor skills involved, or, more recently, about the conditions favorable to their diffusion." Because her work demands collaborations among interdisciplinary researchers, she has worked and published with others in fields such as geosciences, economics, psychology and sociology.

Roux has co-edited the Journal of Archaeological Method and Theory since 2019.

Her book Ceramics and Society: A Technological Approach to Archaeological Assemblages (2019) "encourages archaeologists to approach processing and recording pottery assemblages differently, moving away from a focus on typology towards understanding pottery from a technological perspective".

== Awards ==
- CNRS Silver Medal in 2015.
- Legion d’Honneur under the Ministry of Scientific Research, 2016

== Selected works ==
- Roux, V., Bril, B., & Dietrich, G. (1995). Skills and learning difficulties involved in stone knapping: The case of stone‐bead knapping in Khambhat, India. World archaeology, 27(1), 63-87.
- Roux, V., & Courty, M. A. (1998). Identification of Wheel-fashioning Methods: Technological Analysis of 4th–3rdMillennium B C Oriental Ceramics. Journal of archaeological Science, 25(8), 747-763.
- Roux, V. (2003). A dynamic systems framework for studying technological change: application to the emergence of the potter's wheel in the southern Levant. Journal of archaeological method and theory, 10(1), 1-30.
- Roux, V. (2003). Ceramic standardization and intensity of production: quantifying degrees of specialization. American Antiquity, 68(4), 768-782.
- Roux, V., & Brill, B. (2005). Stone knapping: the necessary conditions for a uniquely hominin behaviour (p. xxx). McDonald Institute for archaeological research.
- Roux, V. (2007). Ethnoarchaeology: a non historical science of reference necessary for interpreting the past. Journal of archaeological method and theory, 14(2), 153-178.
- Roux, V. (2010). Technological innovations and developmental trajectories: social factors as evolutionary forces. Innovation in cultural systems. Contributions from evolutionary anthropology, 217-234.
