= Roger Lemon =

Professor of neurophysiology

Roger Nicolas Lemon (born March 1946) is professor of neurophysiology at University College London. He is a fellow of the Academy of Medical Sciences, elected in 2002. He was awarded the Fyssen International Prize in 2015. Lemon was elected a fellow of the Royal Society in 2021.
