= James M. Skibo =

American archaeologist (1960–2023)

James M. Skibo (January 7, 1960 – April 14, 2023) was an American archaeologist who was the State Archaeologist of Wisconsin from 2021 to 2023. His archaeological research focused on the production and use of ceramics as well as the theory of archaeology and ethnoarchaeology. He was mainly concerned with the Great Lakes, the Southwest United States, and the Philippines.

== Education and career ==
Skibo studied anthropology at Northern Michigan University from 1978 to 1982 and received a Bachelor of Science, Magna cum laude. He then attended the University of Arizona from 1982 to 1990 studying with the late William A. Longacre and Michael Brian Schiffer. There he received a Master of Arts in 1984 and a Ph.D. in anthropology in 1990. From 1992 to 2021 he was at Illinois State University, where he taught as an assistant professor from 1992 to 1995, as an associate professor from 1996 to 2001, and 2001 to 2021 as a full professor. In 2012 he was appointed Distinguished Professor. Starting 2014 Skibo served as the Chair of the Department of Sociology and Anthropology until his retirement.

Skibo was the publisher of the book series Foundations of Archaeological Inquiry and was the co-editor of the Journal of Archaeological Method and Theory from 2000 to 2018. He was a member of the Society for American Archaeology, the Wisconsin Archaeological Society, the Midwestern Archaeological Conference, the Michigan Archaeological Society, and the Illinois Archaeological Survey.

== Research ==
In the 1980s he took part in various excavations and surveys in Arizona, often under the direction of Paul R. Fish. From February to June 1988, he conducted an ethnoarchaeological ceramic investigation among the Kalinga in the northwest of the Philippine island of Luzon as part of the Kalinga Ethnoarchaeological Project. From 1999 to 2001, he was, together with William H. Walker, one of two co-directors of the La Frontera Archaeological Research Program, a four-year project to explore Joyce Well, a 14th century Pueblo located in the southwest of New Mexico. From 2000 to 2023, Skibo, along with Eric Drake, was the Director of the Grand Island Archaeological Field Program, a joint project of Illinois State University and the Hiawatha National Forest, which not only has explored the settlement history of Grand Island but it has also included the training of archaeologists in field research techniques.

After retiring from Illinois State, Skibo joined the Wisconsin Historical Society in 2021 and became the State Archaeologist of Wisconsin, responsible for overseeing the state's thousands of designated archaeological sites. In 2022, he participated in the recovery of two ancient Native American canoes from the bottom of Lake Mendota.

== Personal life and death ==
Skibo was married and has two children.

During a routine research dive in Lake Mendota on April 14, 2023, Skibo became unresponsive and subsequently died at University of Wisconsin Hospital. He was 63.

== Awards ==
- 1995: Research Initiative Award, Illinois State University
- 1996: Outstanding Young Alumni Award from Northern Michigan
- 1999–2000 University College Researcher of the Year (1999–2000) of Illinois State University
- 2001: National Award for Excellence of the United States Forest Service for contributions to “Windows on the Past.”
- 2005: Excellence in Teaching Award of Illinois State University's Student Education Association
- 2012: Award for Excellence in Archaeological Analysis, Society for American Archaeology

== Publications ==
- Pottery Function. A Use-Alteration Perspective. (1992, Plenum Publishing, New York.)
- With William A. Longacre (eds.): Kalinga Ethnoarchaeology: Expanding Archaeological Method and Theory. (1994, Smithsonian Institution Press, Washington, D.C.)
- With Axel E. Nielsen, William H. Walker (eds.): Expanding Archaeology. (1995, University of Utah Press, Salt Lake City)
- With Gary M. Feinman (Eds.): Pottery and People: A Dynamic Interaction. (1999, University of Utah Press, Salt Lake City)
- Ants for Breakfast. Archaeological Adventures Among the Kalinga. (1999, University of Utah Press, Salt Lake City)
- With Eugene B. McCluney, William H. Walker (Eds.): The Joyce Well Site: On the Frontier of the Casas Grandes World. (2002, University of Utah Press)
- Bear Cave Hill: A Memoir. (2006, iUniverse Press, Lincoln, Nebraska)
- With Michael W. Graves, Miriam T. Stark (eds.): Archaeological Anthropology: Perspectives on Method and Theory. (2007, University of Arizona Press, Tucson)
- With Michael B. Schiffer: People and Things: a Behavioral Approach to Material Culture. (2008, Springer, New York)
- Understanding Pottery Function. (2013, Springer Press, New York)
- With William H. Walker (eds.): Explorations in Behavioral Archaeology. (2015, University of Utah Press, Salt Lake City)
