= Michael Brian Schiffer =

American archaeologist (born 1947)

Michael Brian Schiffer (born October 4, 1947, in Winnipeg, Canada) is an American archaeologist and one of the founders and pre-eminent exponents of behavioral archaeology.

Schiffer's earliest ideas, set out in his 1976 book Behavioral Archeology and many journal articles, are mainly concerned with the formation processes of the archaeological record (cultural and noncultural). His most important early contribution to archaeology was the rejection of the common processualist assumption that the archaeological record is a transparent fossil record of actual ancient societies. He argues that artifacts and sites undergo, respectively post-use and post-occupational modification by diverse formation processes.

In his 1972 American Antiquity article Schiffer, using flow models, explained that artifacts generally pass through numerous social contexts of procurement, manufacture, use, recycling, and disposal and that the same kind of artifact can enter the archaeological record at many points through this life history. As societies become more sedentary, the archaeological record typically seems to be one of garbage disposal.

Schiffer's body of theory and method is based on the idea that cultural and noncultural processes (whose patterns are described by generalizations: c-transforms and n-transforms) convert the 'systemic context' (the original dynamics between societies and material objects) into the 'archaeological context' (the record of artifacts examined by archaeologists). Although this approach has been criticized, notably by Lewis Binford, it has permanently affected how archaeologists interpret the archaeological record.

Schiffer is also known for his early contributions to cultural resource management studies, co-editing in 1977 with George J. Gumerman, Conservation Archaeology: A Guide for Cultural Resource Management Studies. In that work, the editors and authors strove to demonstrate that cutting-edge research is a requirement for crafting rigorous arguments about the significance of archaeological resources.

In the 1980s Schiffer's interests expanded to include technological change, and he and James M. Skibo built the Laboratory of Traditional Technology at the University of Arizona. Their experiments in ceramic technology revealed, for example, previously unsuspected techno-functional performance characteristics of traditional surface treatments and temper types. Together, Schiffer and Skibo published around a dozen articles based on their collaboration in the laboratory, which included a different way to think about experimental archaeology and a framework for studying technological change.

During the 1990s and later, Schiffer returned to an old interest in historic electric and electronic technologies. These works uniquely combine an archaeological perspective with the use of historical materials and have led to four books and numerous articles, many of the latter aimed at archaeologists with behavioral models for studying technological change. The behavioral approach to technological change has been synthesized in Schiffer's 2011 book, Studying Technological Change: A Behavioral Approach. His works on early modern and modern technologies have been largely favorably reviewed by historians of science and technology, but in archaeology he remains best known for publications in behavioral archaeology.

Schiffer was also the founding editor of the Journal of Archaeological Method and Theory.

Schiffer retired from the School of Anthropology at the University of Arizona in 2014. He once said, “Anthropology is the only discipline that can access evidence about the entire human experience on this planet.” Hence his fascination with making information public. He is currently a Research Associate in the Lemelson Center, National Museum of American History, Smithsonian Institution, and a research professor, the Department of Anthropology, University of Maryland.

== References and select bibliography ==
- Binford, L.R. 1981. Behavioral archaeology and the "Pompeii premise". Journal of Anthropological Research 37(3): 195–208
- Schiffer, M.B. 1972. Archaeological context and systemic context. American Antiquity 37(2): 156–165
- Schiffer, M.B. 1976. Behavioral Archeology. Academic Press.
- Schiffer, M.B. 1987. Formation Processes of the Archaeological Record. University of New Mexico Press, Albuquerque.
- Schiffer, M.B. 1991. The Portable Radio in American Life. University of Arizona Press, Tucson.
- Schiffer, M.B. 1992. Technological Perspectives on Behavioral Change. University of Arizona Press, Tucson.
- Schiffer, M.B. 1995. (editor) Behavioral Archaeology: First Principles. University of Utah Press, Salt Lake City. This book reprints a selection of writings on behavioral archaeology from 1972 to 1987.
- Schiffer, M.B. 1991. The Portable Radio in American Life. University of Arizona Press, Tucson.
- Schiffer, M.B. 1992 Technological Perspectives on Behavioral Change. University of Arizona Press, Tucson.
- Schiffer, M.B. 1994. (with Tamara C. Butts, and Kimberly K. Grimm) Taking Charge: The Electric Automobile in America. Smithsonian Institution Press, Washington DC. Won the 1995 Cugnot Award of Distinction from the Society of Automotive Historians.
- Schiffer, M.B. 1999. (with Andrea Miller) The Material Life of Human Beings: Artifacts, Behavior, and Communication. Routledge, London.
- Schiffer, M.B. 2001. (editor) Anthropological Perspectives on Technology. University of Utah Press, Salt Lake City.
- Schiffer, M.B. 2003. (with Kacy L. Hollenback and Carrie L. Bell) Draw the Lightning Down: Benjamin Franklin and Electrical Technology in the Age of Enlightenment. University of California Press, Berkeley.
- Schiffer, M.B. 2008. Power Struggles: Scientific Authority and the Creation of Practical Electricity Before Edison. MIT Press, Cambridge.
- Schiffer, M.B. 2010. Behavioral Archaeology: Principles and Practice. Equinox, London.
- Schiffer, M.B. 2011. Studying Technological Change: A Behavioral Approach. University of Utah Press, Salt Lake City.
- Schiffer, M.B. 2013. The Archaeology of Science: Studying the Creation of Useful Knowledge. Springer, New York.
- Skibo, J.M. and M.B. Schiffer. 2009. People and Things: A Behavioral Approach to material Culture. Springer, New York.
- Trigger, B.G. 1996 Review of Behavioral Archaeology: First Principles Michael Brian Schiffer. The Journal of the Royal Anthropological Institute. 2(4): 725–726.
- Graves-Brown, P. 2013 Review of Studying Technological Change: A Behavioral Approach Michael Brian Schiffer. European Journal of Archaeology. 16(4): 739–742.
