= Brian Hayden =

Chemistry professor (born 1954)

- Born: July 1954 (age 72)
- Education: University of Bristol
- Scientific career
- Fields: Physical chemistry
- Workplaces: University of Southampton; Fritz Haber Institute of the Max Planck Society; University of Bath
- Thesis: An investigation of the early stages of oxidation of metals and alloys : using surface potential measurements, volumetric adsorption, xenon physisorption, XPS, AES, exoelectron emission and long wavelength photoemission (1979)
- Website: Prof Brian E Hayden

Brian Elliott Hayden FRSC (born July 1954) has been Professor of Physical Chemistry within Chemistry at the University of Southampton since 1995.

He graduated with a BSc in 1976 and a PhD in 1979 from the University of Bristol. He was a postdoctoral fellow at the Fritz Haber Institute of the Max Planck Society from 1979 to 1984 developing surface sensitive optical spectroscopies, including ellipsometry and reflection absorption infra-red spectroscopy, for the investigation of adsorbed molecules on single crystal surfaces. He was a lecturer at the University of Bath from 1984 to 1988, developing supersonic molecular beam techniques to study reaction dynamics at single crystal metal surfaces.

He is a Fellow of the Royal Society of Chemistry and Fellow of the Institute of Physics, has an h-index of 38, and is the author of over 18 active patent families including new catalysts and materials for low temperature fuel cells and solid state Li-ion batteries. He is a founder and former Chief Scientific Officer of Ilika plc, a pioneer in solid-state battery technology.
