= Kalinga Ethnoarchaeological Project =

20th Century Ethnoarcheaological Study

The Kalinga Ethnoarchaeological Project (KEP), based in the Cordillera Mountains of the Philippines, was one of the longest-running ethnoarchaeological projects in the world. It was initiated by William Longacre, professor at the University of Arizona, in 1973. Lasting for almost 20 years, research focused on pottery production, use, exchange, and discard, and was carried out by Longacre and his team of Kalinga assistants, archaeology students, and colleagues.

== History of the region ==
Kalinga is a province located in the Cordillera Mountains of the Philippines. The word “Kalinga” is not native to the region in fact it “is derived from the Ibanag and Gaddang "Kalinga" which means "headhunters”. Headhunting was a historical practice that was thought to have shown leadership and respect within the community. Once the peace pact was established rules and codes were implemented to limit intertribal quarrels and headhunting. The peace pact is often referred to as the “Bodong” and helped “resolve public disputes, negotiate border problems with neighboring villages” This practice of headhunting is no longer widely and openly practiced, but during World War II “Kalingas loyal to American forces resumed headhunting against Japanese soldiers”. The inhabitants of the Cordillera Mountains are often referred to as Ygorretes. The region was not established as its own political province until after the Philippine–American War. The region of Kalinga has a rich cultural history. The Cordillera Mountain region—where Kalinga is located—is currently known for its mineral resources and at one point was renowned for its gold mines. Since Kalinga was abundant with gold Spaniards and missionaries tried to pacify and colonize the region in hopes of gaining access to the gold and own the land therefore owning the mines and monopolizing the gold. However, after many attempts they were not successful and the colonizers often encountered hostility and defiance from the Ygorretes. It was not until the 1880s when colonizers were successful in gaining control over the region, and much of that was attributed to the recent gun technology advancements which allowed the Spanish colonizers established a militia in the Kalinga area. After the Philippine–American War U.S. colonization occurred and the U.S. began constructing roads and firms in Kalinga. However, the establishment of these entities were drawn to a halt after World War II. After the war American presence in the area began to diminish and the Philippine government neglected the region's politics. This in turn created a downfall of Kalinga. The interventions from the colonizers such as roads and firms began to fall apart. The enterprise's post World War II were haphazard and not supported by the state which resulted in raids from outside forces that hurt the economy, culture and ecology of Kalinga. Due to the decline of Kalinga post WWII there have been pressures to assimilate to non-mountain—more specifically Ilocano—ways of life.

== William Longacre and the Kalinga Ethnoarchaeological Project ==
The site was introduced to Longacre by Edward Dozier, who had previously worked with the Kalingas. He suggested Longacre study the ceramics of the Kalinga because they were a tribal society who lived in small villages. He knew that women used pottery in a way that it was not always traded out of the community. Lastly, he knew that since the Kalinga had previously been studied, long-term research with the Kalingas could be achieved more easily.

Longacre was determined to follow the New Archaeology movement which emphasized explanation over description. Longacre proposed that the pottery the Kalinga made (and still make) could reveal their past. Previously, Longacre studied the pottery of Carter Ranch Pueblo, Arizona. It was here that he made the inference that "certain aspects of social organization could be inferred through such a distributional study". Longacre chose to study a community that still lives and uses the pottery today so that the truth behind the pottery could be revealed. He chose the Kalinga because they are a culture that uses the pottery not only for commercial use, but also for household use. He also wanted a culture that had been previously studied by anthropologists in order to have a foundation of ethnoarchaeological research to rely on. When Longacre went to see the area, the Kalinga convinced him to come back and study their pottery.

The main idea of the Kalinga ethnoarchaeological project was to compare inferences made in Carter Ranch Pueblo to the results of the Kalinga project about the social context of pottery making. Later, in 1975, "the new research goal" was added to the Kalinga ethnoarchaeological project. Longacre and his researchers wished to investigate how long artifacts lasted before they were discarded by the people who used them. Within the Kalinga project specifically, this meant studying how long pots were used before they were discarded.

=== Determining relationships between pottery and household kinship ===
The Kalinga Ethnoarchaeological Project was a comparative study proposed by William Longacre to verify whether or not the social relations (kinship systems) observed at his Carter Ranch Pueblo study were applicable to all pottery making societies or just Carter Ranch itself.

Methods of Longacre's research included: mapping the pottery-making villages in Dangtalan and Dalupa, determining relationships among different households, and identifying stylistic changes in pottery between pottery makers who knew one another vs. pottery makers who did not know each other. The exchange of pottery in the Kalinga community led to a dominance of kinship in the primary social order. The pottery is exchanged via kinship channels, modeling the Kalinga's social relationships. Therefore, this means that the Kalinga's pottery exchange used social relationships in order to frame their economy.

In his dissertation, “Aspects of Exchange in a Kalinga society, Northern Luzon”, Michiko Takaki focused on the Kalinga Ethnoarchaeological Project, specifically how “a particular agricultural people [the Kalinga] make their living and regulate their social relations”. Takaki's field work with the Kalinga as part of the Ethnoarchaeological project took place from 1964 to 1968. He found that social relations among the Kalinga were one of the main ways that made it possible for pottery to be part of their economic process.

The ranking of goods one receives in the Kalinga community parallel to the relationship they have to the member they are receiving from. Receiving goods based on kinship relationships is optional once a fifth degree of genealogical distance is reached. Longacre's study led to the term "ceramic sociology".

== Ceramic production and exchange ==
=== Analysis of Previously unpublished data ===
In a study, William A. Longacre and Taylor R. Hermes analyzed the exchange of pottery, and household rice farming in Dangtalan that took place from 1975 to 1976. The study involved the analyzation of non previously published data from the Kalinga Ethnoarchaeological Project. The data shed light on the Kalinga Ethnoarchaeological Project contains information about the exchange of pottery between different levels of rice farming households. Longacre et al. (2015) argue how the exchange of pottery provides evidence of a Dangtalan household's craft specialization as well as agricultural intensification. In a 2015 research study Longacre and Hermes analyzed pottery exchange in Dangtalan, which included datasets from household material culture inventory that contained ceramic vessels. Longacre's inventory of the Kalinga barrio, Dangtalan, consisted of fifty households, four -hundred ninety four ceramic vessels, and two hundred and fifty-seven individuals. Longacre et al. (2015) argue that there was a correlation between the net trade of ceramic vessels, and the household rice productivity amongst people in Dangtalan. More specifically, the households that had very little rice productivity frequently traded their pots, and households that had immense rice productivity would retrieve the ceramic vessels from the households with low rice productivity. According to Longacre et al. (2015), these findings suggest that the exchange of pottery arbitrated each household's labor in the rice fields as "a function of cooperative work through social relations." The trading of pottery centered on specific households that specialized in the making of pottery, and households that specialized in rice cultivation. The exchange of pottery between the two groups surfaces the existence of specialization in both pottery, and rice cultivation.

=== Ceramic function and technique ===
In the Kalinga society, pottery serves as an extra source of income, and is made by women. The women use their hands to form the vessel, and do not use a wheel. Instead, the potters use coil and scrape techniques as well as paddle and anvil techniques. The clay that is used to form the vessels is local, and often mined by males in the society. Male traders in the Dalupa and Dangtalan villages sometimes barter resin and ocher collected from upland forests, but women prepare the clay as well as shape and fire the pottery. The women learn how to make pots from their mothers, and often make ceramic vessels in groups rather than alone. The pottery is not only made for exchange, but also is made for household needs. The most common household pots are those made for water storage, and cooking rice as well as meat. These types of pots consist of similar decorative features. Pots made for cooking and water jars often are coated with organic resins to reduce water permeability, and also are decorated with red ochre. Open fire is used to fire the pots, and the pots are also air dried. The gifts, such as pottery, that are given are often reciprocated with rice in the Kalinga culture. In addition, the women are responsible for the exchange of pottery that takes place outside of the household, and the amount of uncooked rice that a vessel can hold determines the value of that vessel.

=== Work of other archaeologists ===
In another study, Miriam T. Stark, Ronald L. Bishop, and Elizabeth Miksa analyzed ceramic variations in the pottery producing villages of Dalupa and Dangtalan in the Philippines. Dalupa and Dangtalan are kalinga villages located in the Pasil river valley. Dalupa and Dangtalan are involved in a single exchange network. During the 1970s and 1980s, the Dalupa village had a larger population of around 400 residents, while the Dangtalan village consisted of around 300 to 350 city residents . The Dalupa potters are part-time ceramic specialists, and the women in Dangtalan produce ceramics less often. The women potters in both villages provide residents in the Pasil region with earthenware ceramics, and both villages consist of women that are not active in the production of pottery. Earthenware ceramics are used for storing water in earthenware jars, and also, are used for cooking food such as meat. Earthenware ceramics are also used to cook vegetables . Large earthenware pots are utilized during communal events such as weddings. Pasil potters made a cooking vessel for meat/vegetables, a cooking vessel for rice, a storage vessel for water, and sometimes made a wine storage jar . However, changes occurred in the mid −1980s. During the mid-1980s, not a lot of potters in either village made wine storage earthenware jars. During this time, the Dalupa potters began making stylistic and technological changes such as modifying the surface decorations of the storage jars, and utilized nontraditional ceramics. The Dalupa nontraditional ceramics (ay-ayam) included a wide range of forms that included flower pots, ashtrays for photographic plaques, and animal sculptures. Both Dangtalan and Dalupa ceramics have differences in style and morphology. The Dangtalan potters paint red ocher on the shoulder of the cooking vessels but the Dalupa potters do not do this. Dangtalan cooking pots have wider mouths, and are shorter than Dalupa cooking pots.

Pottery production was utilized for economic necessity. While Dalupa women produced pottery for economic needs, the Dangtalan women did not focus as much on producing pottery as their spouses gained employment beyond the Pasil region. The scale of pottery production in Dalupa is much higher than in Dangtalan today . Factors that include market demand, environmental stress, and younger women, with a lack of experience, entering the Dalupa pottery field contributed to the changes described. The Dalupa women also expanded the distribution of the ceramics, and traveled to more distant markers to sell a wider range of ceramic products. Despite expanding the distribution of ceramics, the Pasil system is not a market oriented industry. Dalupa ceramic production is more intensive than in Dangtalan, but both communities engage in varying degrees of part-time specialization.

== The Kalinga environment ==
The region consists of a cool and temperate climate. The Cordilleras has two distinct ways rain falls throughout the year. In the eastern parts of the region the land could be dry from November to April and receives rain the rest of the year, or there is also another category in which there is no official seasons for rain to fall. Water is a major component of the Kalinga Provence and it could be found scattered throughout streams and springs as well as drainage systems. Kalinga experiences oscillations in its yearly rainfall, but as long as the land receives sufficient rain, the rice fields are not heavily affected. There has been iron axes excavated, and remnants of wood in Sisupalgarh that indicate no dramatic climatic changes during the last two thousand years. During the hot and dry environments water becomes most limited, sometimes leaving the irrigation channels for rice plantations empty in which case farmers obtain their water from streams and springs. Every rice field is unique in its size and shape. The maintainment of rice plantations requires strenuous labor and the gathering of water from many sources in which cases the closer plantains are to a water sources the more convenient it is for workers. The Kalinga regions has two general categories of rice, the qōyak and the qūnoy; the qūnoy only flourishes in the dry season.

The distinct habitat enables the production of unique stylistic industry of artifacts, and the variation found in Kalinga also help archeologist determine the paths of interactions that were made among the people, and it expands upon knowledge on the wealth, religion and political beliefs of the region.

The Kalinga archeological project focuses on the southern part of the Kalinga province including the Pasil River valley. The Pasil region is composed of 13 communities that are independent of each other, each containing anywhere from 30 to over 100 households including Dalupa, Dangtalan, and Guina-ang. Out of the 13 settlements in the Pasil River valley only Dalupa and Dangtalan were regularly producing pottery by the 1980s. The community of Dalupa is found in the mountains of Northern Luzon. Dalupa has resisted 300 years of colonization resulting in the indigenous Kalingas becoming isolated from the modern world.

The production and distribution of ceramic in Kalinga has been influenced by the Kalinga Ethnoarchaeological project. Ceramic Sociology is the study that aims to recreate “social organization” and gain knowledge on how the people interacted. Kalinga made for an appropriate study since they were considered a “tribal” society made up of stationary agriculturalists which utilized pottery on a daily basis. Many of the pots found in Danglatan were not actually made from residents mainly because in Kalinga barter and gift-giving were utilized as the major form of distribution. The increase of ceramic production in Dalupa is coupled with a wider expansion of pottery, allowing potters to trade their products past the boundaries of the Pasil Valley. When trading past the boundaries, potters encounter areas with new social and ethnic practices and some areas that still do not have producer-consumer kinship ties. “ Balanced exchange” negotiations are enacted and earthward pots are one of the artifacts that are bargained. In a traditional Kalinga pottery business deal pounded rice is the method of payment and the amount of uncooked rice contained by each pot dictates its worth. However, there is limited knowledge on the size and methods on which ceramic is distributed in places that do not utilize market methods to exchange.

A significant event that led to changes in the Pasil River valley was the controversy that was developed due to the Chico River dam which initiated in the 1970s. Dams were to be created in the Kalinga region in order to generate electricity for the urban areas, which did not house native Kalinga's. This project would force movement of the Kalingas, which elicited resistance from the people leading to military involvement. Kalinga has undergone construction such as, building, motor vehicles and roads that unite the older more primitive Kalinga villages. Increased developments has made it easier to transport goods to various places.

Kalinga is a region with resources wanted to be exploited by other places, like the mines of gold present and logging. Longacre discovered that many of the water pots in Dangtalan had their exteriors polished with lebu, which is a resin from the almaciga tree. People were able to obtain resin supplies from the migratory traders that lived in areas with the almaciga tree and then traveled to places like Dalupa and Dagnlatan to deliver resin supplies. However, the supply of resin for the Dulapa potters began to dwindle due to governmental changes. One of the main resin deposits is located near the Batong Buhay gold mine that was reopened for mining in the 1970s depriving Dalupa potters from resin because the traders were able to obtain a new form of income. The gold mine has also endangered local resin harvesters due to an increase in highway robberies. The mining of gold in the region would in turn destroy riverine resources that are important for the region.

Kalinga is also getting stripped of its magnificent tropical forests and the vast animal and plant diversity present. The Philippine government has allowed the cutting of trees for lumber having a trickle effect on the native Kalingas. The clearing of land results in less land for Swidden agriculture, mainly with rice cultivation and also forces the natives to modify the materials utilized in the production of artifacts and tools like ceramics. Trees are one of the main ingredients to create pots and other pottery designs. Another major resin reservoir is found in the areas owned by big logging companies like the Cellophil Resources Corporation. Their logging has caused major deforestation in the Kalinga region leaving no trees in which to create resin. Kalinga potters are not only losing forests that allows the manufacture of resin, but are also banned from the remaining forest areas by have fines placed up by the Cellophil corporation. With the newly found rarity for resin, potters need to investigate new materials they could use to polish the exterior of their creations.

Although the mining and logging industries have allowed the introduction of non Kalinga goods into the region since the 1930s, they have still managed to keep a low influx of Filipino populations. The economy in Kalinga is heavily influenced by intensive rice cultivation and the barter system. The Kalinga economy also has a foundation of specialization with different people specializing in different jobs. The Pasil settlements are all composed of bilateral kin groups following the trend of matrilocal communities and endogamy. Within the Kalinga region they are “politically significant units” which are regions that are made up of many communities that act as a unit and have peace pacts with other units.

== The KEP from the 1990s onward ==
Archaeology in the Philippines is broken up into five separate periods correlating not only with the years but with the ethical practices of the archaeologists working at the time. The Kalinga Ethnoarchaeological Project today falls within the Directed Archaeology Period of archaeology during which the state grew increasingly interested in supporting these projects. A few other sites were led by private groups and academic institutions. Success was largely had by research-driven projects such as the Kalinga Ethnoarchaeologial Project—These sites were often foreign-led and supported by the National Museum, and projects that are led by foreign scholars draw global attention to the region. The KEP is an example of “Systematic problem-oriented ethnoarchaeological research” which means that the work done in this place has been done to answer larger questions raised by research in other places. On top of their fieldwork, archaeologists may encounter, by chance, useful infortmants for their research. What is certain about this work is that it is organized with specific questions in mind that are relevant to other archeologists. The KEP was designed by Longacre, and it addresses questions of relationships between ceramic industries, the way people learn, and postmarital residences that were raised in the course of archeological research in the American Southwest. The comparative nature of the KEP were critical in the choice of doing fieldwork in the Kalina in the first place. Researchers of the Kalinga ethnoarchaeological project continue to do research on the site and its findings, but there has not been a large scale dig at the site since the late 1980s. Instead, smaller-scale research is being conducted by Margaret Beck on ceramics and their relationship with the household. Findings from the Kalinga Ethnoarchaeological project have inspired other projects across the globe. Tactics from the KEP are being applied to other sites in South East Asia as well as in the American Southwest. The results have shed light on other similar ceramic industries and has served as framework for understanding what they reveal about a people. The findings themselves have been used to compare with other ceramic industries in the region. The insights provided by the Kalinga Ethnoarchaeological Project is owed to its longitudinal nature—because the project was conducted over a number of years, it was not bounded by the narrow lens of much shorter-termed archaeological projects. The long time spent gathering artifacts and information by the Kalinga Ethnoarchaeological Project has contributed knowledge to the field of archaeology that has been instrumental in later projects all over the globe. William Longacre has had archaeological projects for the KEP until quite recently, publishing work until the year of his death in 2015 including a study on rice farming and ceramics among the Kalinga. Several other studies on the Kalinga ceramic industry and ethnoarchaeological projects just like the Kalinga Ethnoarchaeological Project continue throughout Southeast Asia and the rest of the world.

== Bibliography ==
- Beck, Margaret E. (2006). "Midden Ceramic Assemblage Formation: A Case Study from Kalinga, Philippines". American Antiquity. 71 (1): 27–51. doi:10.2307/40035320. JSTOR 40035320. S2CID 163772671.
- Graves, Michael W. (1994). "Community Boundaries in Late Prehistoric Puebloan Society: Kalinga Ethnoarchaeology as a Model for the Southwestern Production and Exchange of Pottery". In Wills, W. H.; Leonard, Robert D. (eds.). The Ancient Southwestern Community: Models and Methods for the Study of Prehistoric Social Organization. Albuquerque: University of New Mexico Press. pp. 149–170.
- Longacre, William A. (1981). "Kalinga Pottery: An Ethnoarchaeological Study". In Hodder, Ian; Isaac, Glynn Llywelyn; Hammond, Norman (eds.). Pattern of the Past: Studies in Honour of David Clarke. Cambridge: Cambridge University Press. pp. 49–66. ISBN 0-521-22763-1.
- Longacre, William A.; Skibo, James M (1994). Kalinga Ethnoarchaeology: Expanding Archaeological Method and Theory. Washington, D.C.: Smithsonian Institution Press. ISBN 1-56098-272-1.
- Longacre, William A.; Stark, Miriam T. (1992). "Ceramics, Kinship, and Space: A Kalinga Example". Journal of Anthropological Archaeology. 11 (2): 125–136. doi:10.1016/0278-4165(92)90017-6.
- Longacre, William A.; Hermes, Taylor R. (2015). "Rice Farming and Pottery Production Among the Kalinga: New Ethnoarchaeological Data from the Philippines". Journal of Anthropological Archaeology. 38: 35–45. doi:10.1016/j.jaa.2014.09.005.
- Stark, Miriam T (1991). "Ceramic Production and Community Specialization: A Kalinga Ethnoarchaeological Study". World Archaeology. 23 (1): 64–78. doi:10.1080/00438243.1991.9980159.
- Stark, Miriam T.; Bishop, Ronald L.; Miksa, Elizabeth (2000). "Ceramic Technology and Social Boundaries: Cultural Practices in Kalinga Clay Selection and Use". Journal of Archaeological Method and Theory. 7 (4): 295–331. doi:10.1023/A:1026518922642. S2CID 9271054.
- Stark, Miriam T.; Skibo, James M. (2007). "A History of the Kalinga Ethnoarchaeological Project". In Skibo, James M.; Graves, Michael W.; Stark, Miriam T. (eds.). Archaeological Anthropology: Perspectives on Method and Theory. Tucson: University of Arizona Press. pp. 93–110. ISBN 978-0-8165-4509-4.
- Tani, Masakazu; Longacre, William A. (1999). "On Methods of Measuring Ceramic Uselife: A Revision of the Uselife Estimates of Cooking Vessels among the Kalinga, Philippines". American Antiquity. 64 (2): 299–308. doi:10.2307/2694280. JSTOR 2694280.
