= Evolutionary archaeology =

Field of archaeology

There are two main approaches currently used to analyze archaeological remains from an evolutionary perspective: evolutionary archaeology and behavioral (or evolutionary) ecology. The former assumes that cultural change observed in the archaeological record can be best explained by the direct action of natural selection and other Darwinian processes on heritable variation in artifacts and behavior. The latter assumes that cultural and behavioral change results from phenotypic adaptations to varying social and ecological environments.

== History of evolutionary theory in archaeology ==
=== Evolutionary archaeology in the 19th century ===
Over the past decades the term ‘evolution’ has undertaken several definitions and implications. However, when referring to “human history and the development of long term trends it is used interchangeably with social or sociocultural evolution”. The publication of Charles Darwin's On the Origin of Species profoundly influenced the biological and social sciences. However, 19th century evolutionary archaeologists were influenced by the unilineal evolutionary schemes of Herbert Spencer and others. Spencer embraced a teleological notion where evolution was seen as having an ultimate and definite goal. Spencerian theory incorporated a progressive, unilineal explanation of cultural evolution in which human societies were seen as progressing through a fixed set of stages, from “savagery” through “barbarism” to “civilization”. Thus, for much of the 19th century evolutionary theory in archaeology was centered around explaining cultural traits and human history and account for the significant differences between cultural groups and their current state of living. Initially it focused on human transitions from foragers to horticulturalist, to implementation of agriculture, and eventually rise of civilizations. Even into the early 20th century, evolutionary archaeologists, or cultural evolutionists, maintained a thoroughly non-Darwinian notion of evolution”.

=== Evolutionary archaeology in the early-to-mid 20th century ===
"The social and political implications of early cultural evolutionary thinking, such as eugenics and other atrocities, understandably promoted a reaction, and the social sciences turned towards a thoroughly anti-biological stance: The Standard Social Science Model. Therefore, a strong resistance among social scientists rose arguing for limited biological restraints on human behavior. This reaction led to the acceptance of social influences and culture affecting and changing human behavior. The Standard Social Science Model, assumes that “culture is selected by free agents making active, unconstrained choices, and there has been a tendency to stress the vast plethora of different cultural practices rather than to look for cultural universals” (Workman and Reader, 2004).

The acceptance of the Standard Social Science Model and rejection of explanatory evolutionary theories in anthropology, resulted in Darwinian theory not being applied by anthropologist and archaeologist. As Dunnell (1980) surmises, “In the 1950s due to the influence of Boasian school of thought, a dissatisfaction with the supposed Marxist connotations of evolution, and failure to accommodate a complex archaeological record, evolutionary theory was no longer a prevalent method used to explain archaeological phenomena”.

In the 1960s, Binford introduced a new explanatory framework in archaeology known as “New Archaeology” or “Processual Archaeology”. This framework incorporated an evolutionary foundation, which was previously omitted in archaeology. This was a crucial step in archaeology since it acknowledged the need for a scientific explanation in the archaeological record and not just descriptive accounts. Dunnell (1980) claims that even though the New Archaeology program insists on incorporating a scientific method, remnants of the early 1900s notion of evolution still remained, therefore ‘evolution’ as it is used in the hard sciences, has yet to be utilized with the same rigidity in the social sciences, specifically in archaeology.

=== Neo-Darwinian theory in archaeology ===
The modern evolutionary synthesis, also called neo-Darwinian theory, was developed in the 1930s and 1940s. In the 1970s and 1980s, with the groundbreaking works of E.O. Wilson. Hamilton and R. Dawkins, a shift occurred from social-cultural explanation of human behavior to the return of biological, reductionist explanations based on neo-Darwinian evolutionary theory. This is sometimes called the sociobiology approach. It provided a rich theoretical groundwork for analyzing culture in terms of modern evolutionary theory, but also developed “rigorous mathematical treatments of cultural change inspired by population genetic models”. With the works of Cavalli-Sforza and Feldman and Boyd and Richerson, evolutionary archaeology become a more utilized approach.

Over the last three decades, two main evolutionary frameworks emerged in archaeology: Evolutionary Archaeology (EA) and Evolutionary Ecology (EE). The former draws on analogies with genetic and biological evolution in that it focuses on variation in cultural traits and attempts to reconstruct their phylogenetic histories. The latter views variation in artifacts as reflecting adaptive human behavior.

== Evolutionary archaeology ==
=== Cultural traits ===
EA focuses on cultural "traits" (or memes) and conceives of them as analogies to genes. That is, cultural traits and genes both have the three characteristics necessary for natural selection (variation, selection, and inheritance) as well as non-selective processes, such as drift. Defining the terms "culture" and "cultural traits" are key to effective EA research. Richerson and Boyd (2005), define culture as "information capable of affecting individual’s behavior that they acquire from other members of their species through teaching, imitation, and other forms of social transmission". "Information" is employed as a broad term incorporating ideas, knowledge, beliefs, values, skills, and attitudes (Mesoudi, 2006).

Variation, selection, and inheritance are necessary for changes of material remains (cultural traits) observed in the archaeological record. These traits can go extinct as a result of competition, change in function or become vestigial, and adapt to their environment, as demonstrated by the work of human behavioral ecologists (Smith & Winterhalder 1992). They can be identified as analogous traits of exhibit the process of convergent evolution. Geographical distribution of cultural traits can vary through diffusion and can be explained by an evolutionary framework. Mesoudi et al. (2004), argues that Darwinian theory became successful without the knowledge of Mendelian inheritance, therefore cultural evolution does not have to rely on memes or "particulate cultural transmission, a topical issue but one of great contention".

Evolutionary Archaeology is based on the notion that claims culture exhibits key Darwinian evolutionary properties. Therefore, on this basis, EA should follow the same, methods, and approaches that are used to study biological evolution and by doing so it can productively be applied to the study of human culture. By incorporating a comparison with the biological sciences, EA claims that the analysis of cultural will have scientific merit and lead to more progressive theoretical framework, that has yet to be employed in the analysis of cultural and social anthropology (archaeology as well) (Boone & Smith 1998). EA emphasizes the role of natural selection in affecting human behavior and do not consider the need to understand changing cultural traditions as part of their framework (Shennan 2008).

Evolutionary archaeologist claim EA is not employing scientific metaphors from biology to explain archaeological process, but instead these evolutionary outlooks can elucidate the effect "on the questions asked, the taxonomies employed, and the role of archaeology as a discipline in a wider scientific and public landscape" (Mesoudi 2006). Runciman (2005) claims that the goal of archaeologists working within an evolutionary paradigm is to explain how and why particular cultural traits become more common than others over time.

Shennan (2004b) states that even though archaeologist seek to understand human history and prehistory, the theoretical framework and methods should not be limited to teleological explanations of 'progress', but archaeologist should play to their strengths, "which undoubtedly lie in the characterization of long-term patterning in past societies".

Overall as summarized by Mesoudi (2006) it is necessary to understand individual choices and historical events because they are parts of evolutionary history. Especially since humans, unlike other species, are continuously generating and altering the social and physical environments to which they have to adapt.

=== Phylogenetics ===
According to Mesoudi (2006) it is necessary to treat cultural traits as analogous to biological characters. By using this analogy, it allows anthropologists and archaeologists, to apply strict phylogenetic methods to cultural data, no differently than evolutionary biologists (Mesoudi, 2006). The logic behind this approach is that like biologists, anthropologists share the same fundamental goals. The first goal is to reconstruct the historical timeline of a specific trait, and the second goal is to distinguish and identify patterns of change(Mesoudi, 2006).

Mesoudi states that there have been several anthropological and archaeological studies utilizing this approach (phylogenetics) and have been deemed successful by "determining whether a group of traits are related by descent, whether their spread was associated with other traits, or whether they generated selection for other traits" (2006).

Specifically, this phylogenetic approach is crucial for archaeologists who are seeking to employ evolutionary paradigms in their research. Just like paleobiologists, archaeologists seek to answer similar research questions and tasks. In sum, their goals are “identifying prehistoric artifacts, reconstructing lineages of these artifacts and of the people associated with them, and revealing the evolutionary relationships between these lineages” (Mesoudi, 2006). Even the means of gathering data are similar if not the same. Both paleobiologist/paleontologist and archaeologists engage in excavations to retrieve information about past specimens. Evolutionary archaeologists, thus, have shared the similar tools and methodological trajectories as paleobiologists. For example, O’Brien & Lyman (2000) uses the evolutionary “population thinking” explanatory frameworks, while Mace & Holden (2005) use cladistics and Neiman (1995) and uses models of selection or drift. Mesoudi (2006) positions, that only in recent development have archaeologist started utilizing these phylogenetic approached in analyzing material remains and human history.

=== Seriation and cladistics ===
Seriation has not always been excluded from archaeological methods, according to Mesoudi (2006), “early archaeologists used the method of seriation to identify lineages of coins (Evans 1850), stone tools (PittRivers 1875), and Egyptian pottery (Petrie 1899)”. However, this approach was no longer employed by archaeologists in the 20th century because of a rise in the essentialist approach to archaeology, where cultural trait change occurs when one type transforms into another (Lyman and O’Brien, 2003).This again, is drastically different from the methods evolutionary archeologist employ. They view which recognizes naturally occurring variation within populations rather than focusing on typological descriptions (Mesoudi, 2006).

Applying phylogenetic theory in archaeology and paleobiology takes on a fundamental assumption. This is that similar traits that vary through time are “causally connected by inheritance” which O’Brien & Lyman (2000) term the assumption of “heritable continuity”. These evolutionary lineages according to Simpson (1961) serve as a means to define a species.

Furthermore, Hull (1982) has argued for the idea of lineage based species to serve as an explanatory framework for culture. O’Brien and Lyman (2000) are some of the first archaeologist to systematically employ this phylogenetic approach to material remains, specifically, have expanded the theory to explain prehistoric artifacts. They argue that by employing seriation methods to the archaeological record they can reconstruct the evolutionary lineages of artifacts (O’Brien and Lyman 2000). This is accomplished by collecting an assemblage of material remains of a specific cultural trait, such a projectile point, and then artifacts are ordered by similarity. Essentially the more in common two artifacts are, the closer together placed on a phylogenetic diagram, the less they have in common, the further apart they are placed (Mesoudi, 2006). Seriation represents an evolutionary lineage connected by cultural transmission when artifacts show gradual, and coincidental change.

O’Brien and Lyman (2000) are major proponents for reintroducing seriation into archaeology. They believe using this approach they can study evolutionary change in artifacts. One main example is their research based on the analysis of Southwestern United States projectile points. By employing these phylogenic and specifically seriation methods they “show continuous, and gradually changing variation rather than a small number of distinct types” (Mesoudi, 2006). They are practitioners of this approach because they argue that this method does not “force artifacts into distinct categories and distorts their true phylogenetic relationships” (O’Brien and Lyman 2000). O’Brien and Lyman (2003) state that employing cladistics methods is also necessary if one is trying to explain the archaeological record accurately. They have conducted successful research “using a phylogenetic analysis of 621 Paleo-Indian projectile points from the Southeastern United States and Tehrani and Collard (2002) used similar methods to reconstruct the history of Turkmen textile pattern”.

However, they acknowledge the application of phylogenetics in archaeology is no different than in paleobiology therefore one can expect similar problems to arise, such as distinguishing between homologies and analogies.

=== Neutral drift model ===
Another approach in evolutionary archaeology is the adaptation of neutral drift models from evolutionary biology (example, Crow & Kimura (1970) to account for “stylistic variation” in artifacts (Mesoudi, 2006). Neiman (1995), used a model that incorporated the selectively neutral but opposing forces of drift and innovation to show changes in ornamental styles of Illinois Woodland ceramic, while Bentley and Shennan (2003) “found that the frequencies of West German pottery decorations over the course of 400 years can be predicted by a similar model of unbiased cultural transmission, with some anti-conformist bias in later period”.

=== Criticisms ===
The main criticism of the EA is that one cannot use biological terminology and simply apply it to other disciplines, such as anthropology and specifically archaeology. In other words, critics claim that there is no value of this approach and words such as ‘variation’, ‘selection’ and ‘drift’ are merely metaphorical. They state no scientific methods exist that can justify employing the theory of evolution that exists in biology and paleobiology to what is observed in the social world. Another criticism is that human culture is increasingly complex and variable thus it can’t be constrained to the same theoretical notions such evolutionary biology. In addition, critics such as, Bloch 2000; Pinker 1997 blatantly reject any evolutionary analysis of culture. The use of phylogenetics and cladistics also is an issue because it is quite difficult to account for distinct “characters” in cultural artifacts, as O’Brien & Lyman (2003) state. The counterargument is that just as biologist struggled with this notion, it did not prevent them from “producing valuable work using the character concept” (Wagner 2000).

Ultimately, biological and cultural change share many similarities, yet the two frameworks are still not identical, therefore researcher must be advised that these biological models “cannot and should not be unthinkingly applied to cultural phenomena without careful consideration of any potential differences” (Plotkin 2002b).

== Evolutionary ecology ==
Evolutionary ecology also employs Darwinian properties; however natural selection is involved in the development of the cognitive process that led humans to be able to make fitness enhancing decisions. Archaeologist who utilized EE, use adaptive design as a starting point to create and test models by incorporating optimization goals, currencies and constraints (Boone & Smith 1998). EE emphasizes the importance of understanding changing cultural traditions (Shennan 2008).

According to Boone and Smith (1998) EE applies phenotypic variation in a more accurate approach. They claim that humans have been designed by the processes of selection to make adaptive changes to their phenotypes. This phenotypic variation results from “genetically and/or culturally evolved mechanisms and variable conditions (Boone and Smith, 1998). Therefore, they claim that the only role natural selection plays in and EE framework is in the development of the cognitive process that allow humans to make adaptive decisions, and respond to variable environments. They also, mention that environment is one of the driven factors in prompting variation among humans. In other words, humans have “problem-solving abilities at various levels such as physiological, morphological, behavioral and scales” (Boone and Smith, 1998). This is based on a notion referred to as phenotypic plasticity, essentially phenotypes under the EE approach can respond to varying environmental conditions. What is important to gather is that by applying an EE analysis to anthropological and archaeological phenomena, it allows researchers to employ phenotypic plasticity to the explanations of human behavior. By doing so, this explanatory framework gives humans the cognitive abilities to “adapt to change quicker that they could through natural selection acting on genetic variation” (Boone and Smith, 1998).

Evolutionary ecology assumes that “behavioral variation itself is not the direct product of natural selection, rather, selection enters the explanation only indirectly, as the process that designed the behaving organism (or in fact its ancestors) to respond facultatively and adaptively to particular environmental conditions” (Boone and Smith, 1998).
