= Ethnoarchaeology =

Ethnographic study of peoples for archaeological reasons

Ethnoarchaeology is the ethnographic study of peoples for archaeological reasons, usually through the study of the material remains of a society (see David & Kramer 2001). Ethnoarchaeology aids archaeologists in reconstructing ancient lifeways by studying the material and non-material traditions of modern societies. Ethnoarchaeology also aids in the understanding of the way an object was made and the purpose of what it is being used for. Archaeologists can then infer that ancient societies used the same techniques as their modern counterparts given a similar set of environmental circumstances.

One good example of ethnoarchaeology is that of Brian Hayden (1987), whose team examined the manufacture of Mesoamerican quern-stones, providing valuable insights into the manufacture of prehistoric quern-stones. Many other studies have focused on the manufacture and use of ceramics, architecture, food, fiber, and other types of material culture. In the best cases, these studies have involved long-term ethnographic fieldwork (for example, Herbich 1987, Kramer 1997, Deal 1998, Dietler & Herbich 1998, Hinshaw 2000, Longacre & Skibo 2000, Kohn 2010).

== Origins and development ==
Although ethnography has long been used by archaeologists to draw analogies to the past, ethnographic data is not gathered with specifically archaeological goals in mind. Ethnoarchaeology developed as a response to the feeling among archaeologists that ethnography did not adequately answer their own specific research questions.

American archaeologist Jesse Walter Fewkes first mentioned the "ethno-archaeologist" in 1900, and encouraged archaeologists to conduct their own ethnographic fieldwork. Widespread acceptance of ethnoarchaeology as a true subdiscipline of archaeology did not emerge until the late 1950s and 1960s, as archaeologists began to explore the different scientific applications it might have. Ethnoarchaeology today has become a widely accepted research practice, with a few archaeologists even identifying as "ethnoarchaeologists" rather than simply "archaeologists."

== Analogy ==
Analogy in archaeology is, essentially, applying observed behavior to non-observed behavior. It is perhaps one of the most used research tools in archaeological interpretation. Analogies can best be drawn between those cultures who share similar environments. More importantly, these cultures must interact with their habitats in ways that are comparable to one another.

Analogies can only provide clues and not sound, definitive answers to research questions. For this reason, G.S. McCall calls for a comparative view for analysis in his cross-cultural study of the Gamo and Konso of southern and central Ethiopia, the Siberian Chukchi, highland New Guinea, highland Maya of Guatemala and Mexico, central, northern, and western arid regions of Australia, the Tjmba of northern Namibia, and the Xeta of Amazonia and their uses of lithics.

=== Formal analogies ===
Formal analogies are made with the assumption that, as Paul Lane describes, "because two objects or contexts share a similar appearance or shape, they are likely to share other properties as well, typically that of function." One of the major issues with this approach is that often these objects or contexts that initially appeared similar may have been used for very different purposes or served different functions. Perhaps the different objects were even created differently. In a 1971 study, Gould and his team compared working edge angle of Mousterain Quina scrapers and modern Western Desert Aboriginal scrapers and found the Mousterain angles to be steeper. Gould reasoned this was due to the Western Desert Aborigines retouching the scrapers further than the Hominids of the Mousterian. Gould et al. concluded that this method of studying ethnographic tool use for comparison could be employed to determine what tools were used for.

=== Relational analogies ===
Relational analogies are opposite from formal analogies. Instead of just drawing the conclusions, one must prove the relationship, and both sides of the analogy are studied and a relationship must be demonstrated between the ethnographic object and the archaeological object.

== Direct historical approach ==
One popular method in ethnoarchaeology was the use of the direct historical approach. This approach relied on living cultures that may be closely genetically or spatially related to the archaeological culture of interest in order to form analogies that may be used to explain findings. Gould and his team explains how archaeologists should be able to measure the degree of differences between the tools found with the ethnographic material and the artifacts However, while this technique may be useful it does not account for cultural change over time, and has been dismissed in the last twenty years for an ethnoarchaeology that takes into account continuities and changes among descendant communities The "folk cultural approach" is the Old World equivalent to this and the term may be used in place of the direct historical approach.

== Issues ==
Ethnography can provide insights of value to archaeologists into how people in the past may have lived, especially with regard to their social structures, religious beliefs and other aspects of their culture. However, it is still unclear how to relate most of the insights generated by this anthropological research to archaeological investigations. This is due to the lack of emphasis by anthropologists on the material remains created and discarded by societies and on how these material remains vary with differences in how a society is organised.

This general problem has led archaeologists (for example, London [2000]) to argue that anthropological work is not adequate for answering archaeological problems, and that archaeologists should therefore undertake ethnoarchaeological work to answer these problems. These studies have focused far more on the manufacture, use and discard of tools and other artifacts and have sought to answer such questions as what kinds of objects used in a living settlement are deposited in middens or other places where they may be preserved, and how likely an object is to be discarded near to the place where it was used.

Another issue often faced in ethnoarchaeology is the potential for a single archaeological situation to have multiple possible analogies drawn from it. A process of elimination must take place to narrow down all of the possibilities until the best solution can be discovered.

== See also ==
- Ethnohistory
- Kalinga Ethnoarchaeological Project

== Bibliography ==
- Binford, L 2002 In pursuit of the past : decoding the archaeological record : with a new afterword, University Of California Press. ISBN 9780520233393
- David, N. & C. Kramer 2001 Ethnoarchaeology in Action, Cambridge University Press.
- Deal, M. 1998 Pottery Ethnoarchaeology in the Central Maya Highlands, University of Utah Press.
- Dietler, M. & I. Herbich 1998 Habitus, techniques, style: an integrated approach to the social understanding of material culture and boundaries, in The Archaeology of Social Boundaries, M. Stark ed., pp. 242–273, Smithsonian.
- Hayden, B. ed. 1987 Lithic studies among the contemporary Highland Maya, University of Arizona Press.
- Herbich, I. 1987 Learning patterns, potter interaction and ceramic style among the Luo of Kenya. The African Archaeological Review 5:193-204.
- Hinshaw, J. 2000 Ethnobotanical and Archaeobotanical Relationships: A Yuman Case Study, Coyote Press.
- Kohn, A. 2010 Of Bricks and Blood: Vernacular Spatial Practice and Social Relations in the City of LaPaz, Bolivia, PhD dissertation, University of Chicago.
- Kramer, C. 1997 Pottery in Rajasthan: Ethnoarchaeology in Two Indian Cities, Smithsonian.
- London, G. 2000 Ethnoarchaeology and interpretation, in Near Eastern Archaeology 63:2-8.
- Longacre, W. & J. Skibo eds. 1994 Kalinga Ethnoarchaeology, Smithsonian.
