= Index of geology articles =

Alphabetical listing of Wikipedia articles on Geology topics

This is a list of all articles related to geology – Scientific study of Earth's physical composition that cannot be readily placed on the following subtopic pages:

- Geologic time scale – System that relates geologic strata to time
- List of chemical elements
- List of compounds – Set index article
- Lists of earthquakes
- Geology of the English counties – List of Wikipedia articles on the geology of English counties
- List of geologists – List of Wikipedia articles on notable geologists
- List of individual rocks
- Glossary of landforms
- List of minerals – List of minerals with Wikipedia articles
- List of minerals by optical properties
- List of oil fields – Some of the major oilfields of the past and present
- Outline of plate tectonics – Hierarchical outline list of articles related to plate tectonics
- List of rock types – List of rock types recognized by geologists
- List of tectonic plates – Overview of tectonic plates
- Lists of volcanoes

== A ==
- Asthenosphere – Highly viscous, ductile, and mechanically weak region of Earth's mantle
- Astrogeology – Geology of astronomical objects apparently in orbit around stellar objects
- Aulacogen – Failed arm of a triple junction, an inactive rift zone

== B ==
- Batholith – Large igneous rock intrusion
- Beach – Area of loose particles at the edge of the sea or other body of water
- Bolide – Extremely bright meteor

== C ==
- Calcium – chemical element with symbol Ca and atomic number 20
- Canyon – Deep chasm between cliffs
- Cave – Natural void under the Earth's surface
- Cement – Hydraulic binder used in the composition of mortar and concrete
- Cementation – Process of chemical precipitation bonding sedimentary grains
- Cenozoic – Third era of the Phanerozoic Eon
- Coast – Area where land meets the sea or ocean
- Concretion – In geology, a type of compact mass
- Conglomerate – Sedimentary rock composed of smaller rock fragments
- Continent – Large geographical region identified by convention
- Convergent boundary – Region of active deformation between colliding tectonic plates
- Crag and tail – Geographic feature created by glaciation
- Crust – Outermost solid shell of astronomical bodies

== D ==
- Datum (geodesy) – Reference frame for measuring location
- Deposition – Geological process in which sediments, soil and rocks are added to a landform or landmass
- Diapir – Type of geologic intrusion
- Dike – Sheet of rock that is formed in a fracture of a pre-existing rock body
- Divergent boundary – Linear feature that exists between two tectonic plates that are moving away from each other
- Drumlin – Elongated hill formed by glacial action

== E ==
- Earth science – Fields of natural science related to Earth
- Environmental engineering – Engineering discipline related to environmental science
- Environmental geography – Intersection of human and physical geography
- Eon – Subdivision of geological time; shorter than a supereon and longer than an era
- Epigenesis
- Epoch – Subdivision of geological time; shorter than a period and longer than an age
- Era – Subdivision of geological time; shorter than an eon and longer than a period
- Eustasy – Global sea level independent of local factors

== F ==
- Fahlband – Stratum in crystalline rock, containing metallic minerals
- Fall line – Meeting point of uplands and coastal plain
- Felsic – Igneous rock rich in silica and feldspar

== G ==
- Geologic age – Smallest hierarchical geochronologic unit
- Geologic fault – Fracture or discontinuity in displaced rock
- Geologic modelling – Applied science of creating computerized representations of portions of the Earth's crust
- Geologic period – Geologic time unit shorter than an era, longer than an epoch
- Geologic time scale – System that relates geologic strata to time
- Geological phenomenon
- Geologist – Scientist who studies geology
- Geology – Scientific study of Earth's physical composition
- Geology of the Alps – The formation and structure of the European Alps
- Geomorphology – Scientific study of landforms
- Geostatistics – Branch of statistics focusing on spatial data sets
- Geyser – Natural explosive eruption of hot water
- Glacial period, also known as Glaciation – Interval of time within an ice age that is marked by colder temperatures and glacier advances
- Graben – Depressed block of planetary crust bordered by parallel normal faults

== H ==
- Hadean – Geologic eon, 4567–4031 million years ago
- Horst (geology) – Raised fault block bounded by normal faults
- Hotspot (geology) – Volcanic region hotter than the surrounding mantle

== I ==
- Igneous rock – Rock formed through the cooling and solidification of magma or lava
- Integrated geography – Intersection of human and physical geography
- Isostasy – State of gravitational equilibrium between Earth's crust and mantle

== K ==
- Karst – Topography from dissolved soluble rocks

== L ==
- Laccolith – Mass of igneous rock formed from magma
- List of geologists – List of Wikipedia articles on notable geologists
- List of tectonic plates – Overview of tectonic plates
- List of rock types – List of rock types recognized by geologists
- Lithosphere – Outermost shell of a terrestrial-type planet or natural satellite
- Lithotope – Geological term

== M ==
- Mafic – Silicate mineral or igneous rock that is rich in magnesium and iron
- Mantle (geology) – Layer inside a planet between core and crust
- Marine regression – Geologic event in which sea level falls relative to the land
- Mass wasting – Movement of rock or soil down slopes
- Matrix (geology) – Finer-grained material in a rock within which coarser material is embedded
- Metamorphic rock – Rock that was subjected to heat and pressure
- Meteorite – Solid debris from outer space that hits a planetary surface
- Mineral – Crystalline chemical element or compound formed by geologic processes
- Mining engineering – Engineering discipline
- Mudpot – Hot spring, or fumarole, with limited water
- Mud volcano – Landform created by the eruption of mud or slurries, water, and gases

== O ==
- Orogeny – The formation of mountain ranges

== P ==
- Paleontology – Study of life before the Holocene epoch
- Pedology – Study of soils in their natural environment
- Permeability (materials science) – Measure of the ability of a porous material to allow fluids to pass through it
- Petroleum engineering – Extracting crude oil and natural gas
- Phosphate – Anion, salt, functional group or ester derived from a phosphoric acid
- Piercement structure – Type of geologic intrusion
- Planetary geology – Geological study of planets
- Plate tectonics – Movement of Earth's lithosphere
- Porphyry (geology) – Movement of Earth's lithosphere
- Proterozoic – Geologic eon, 2500–539 million years ago

== R ==
- Regression (geology) – Geologic event in which sea level falls relative to the land
- Relative density – Ratio of two densities
- Rift – Geological linear zone where the lithosphere is being pulled apart
- Rock (geology) – Naturally occurring mineral aggregate
- Rock strata – Layers of sediment, rock or soil with internally consistent characteristics
- Rodinia – Hypothetical Neoproterozoic supercontinent
- Rubidium–strontium dating – Radiometric dating technique for rocks and minerals

== S ==
- Sand – Granular material composed of finely divided rock and mineral particles
- Sandstone – Type of sedimentary rock
- Sediment trap – Any topographic depression where sediments substantially accumulate over time
- Sedimentary rock – Rock formed by the deposition and cementation of particles
- Sequence stratigraphy – Study and analysis of groups of sedimentary deposits
- Silicate mineral – Rock-forming minerals with predominantly silicate anions
- Sill – Tabular intrusion between older layers of rock
- Stratigraphy – Study of rock layers and their formation
- Stratum – Layer of sediment, rock or soil with internally consistent characteristics
- Subduction – A geological process at convergent tectonic plate boundaries where one plate moves under the other

== T ==
- Tar pit – Asphalt pit or asphalt lake
- Tenham (meteorite) – Chondritic meteorite that fell in 1879 in a remote area of Queensland, Australia
- Timeline of geology – Chronological list of notable events in the history of the science of geology
- Transform fault – Plate boundary where the motion is predominantly horizontal
- Transgression (geology) – Geologic event in which sea level rises relative to the land

== U ==
- Uniformitarianism – Assumption that the natural laws and processes of the universe are constant through time and space

== V ==
- Volcano – Rupture in a planet's crust where material escapes
