= Mikkel Escholt =

Mikkel Peders[s]øn Escholt (c. 1600 – 1669) was a Norwegian priest and natural theologian, best known for his book Geologia Norvegica written in Danish in 1657 where he is considered as among the first to use the word "geology".

Very little is known about Escholt, except that he was likely from Espholt, Skåne. He studied at Malmö around 1626 and at the University of Copenhagen around 1628. He worked as a chaplain at Akershus Fortress from 1646 and as priest in Våler, Østfold, from 1660. He was married to Karen Henriksdatter of Christiania.

His 1657 book Geologia Norvegica is extremely rare; a copy is in Oslo and another in Bergen. Escholt linked earthquakes with volcanoes and used the word "geology" which was also used in an English translation of the book made in 1663 by Daniel Collins. The term "geologia" however was never used except in the title to refer to a kind of science of the earth. Further such usage had been made earlier by Philippus Cluver in a 1619 book Geologia, de Creatione ed Formatione Globi Terrestris in Italian. The English writer Robert Lovell also used the word "geology" in his Pammineralogicon, or, A universal history of mineralls (1661).

Escholt also published a book of verses dedicated to the priest and theological writer Christen Staphensøn Bang, and a history Stephanologica Danica (1648) on Danish kings to commemorate Frederik III as king of Norway.
