= Critical taper =

In mechanics and geodynamics, a critical taper is the equilibrium angle made by the far end of a wedge-shaped agglomeration of material that is being pushed by the near end. The angle of the critical taper is a function of the material properties within the wedge, pore fluid pressure, and strength of the fault (or décollement) along the base of the wedge.

In geodynamics the concept is used to explain tectonic observations in accretionary wedges. Every wedge has a certain "critical angle", which depends on its material properties and the forces at work. This angle is determined by the ease by which internal deformation versus slip along the basal fault (décollement) occurs. If the wedge deforms more easily internally than along the décollement, material will pile up and the wedge will reach a steeper critical taper until such a point as the high angle of the taper makes internal deformation more difficult than sliding along the base. If the basal décollement deforms more easily than the material does internally, the opposite will occur. The result of these feedbacks is the stable angle of the wedge known as the critical taper.

When natural processes (such as erosion, or an increase in load on the wedge due to the emplacement of a sea or ice cap) change the shape of the wedge, the wedge will react by internally deforming to return to a critically tapered wedge shape. The critical taper concept can thus explain and predict phases and styles of tectonics in wedges.

An important presumption is that the internal deformation of the wedge takes place by frictional sliding or brittle fracturing and is therefore independent of temperature.

== Mechanical quantification ==
Schematic representation of a wedge of sediments, pushed over a slope (for example a downward bending plate) by a force $\sigma$_{x}. At mechanic equilibrium, the resisting force parallel to the base slope (indicated by a red arrow) will equal the pushing force. The material properties and magnitude of the forces determine the critical angle $\alpha + \beta$ of the wedge.

The critical taper concept assumes mechanical equilibrium, which means the compressional force (the tectonic push) that created the wedge will be equal to the resisting forces inside the wedge.

=== Resisting forces ===
These forces resisting the tectonic force are the load (weight) of the wedge itself, the eventual load of an overlying column of water and the frictional resistance at the base of the wedge (this is the shear strength at/of the base, $\tau_b$). Mechanical equilibrium thus means:

load of wedge + load of water + $\!\tau_b$ = tectonic push

The first term in this formula stands for the resisting force of the load of the wedge along the base of the wedge. This force is the density of the wedge material ($\rho$) times the gravitational acceleration (g), working on a surface with dimensions dx and dy (unit vectors). This is multiplied by the sine of the angle of the base of the wedge ($\beta$) to get the component parallel to the base:

load of wedge = $\!\rho g H sin\beta$

The second term ($\rho_w * g * D * sin(\alpha + \beta)$) is the resisting force of the load of an eventual water column on top of the wedge. Accretionary wedges in front of subduction zones are normally covered by oceans and the weight of the seawater on top of the wedge can be significant. The load of the water column is the hydrostatic pressure of the water column, multiplied by a factor $\alpha + \beta$ (the angle between the top of the wedge and the base of the wedge) to get the component parallel to the base of the wedge. The hydrostatic pressure is calculated as the product of the density of water ($\rho_w$) and the gravitational acceleration (g):

load of water = $\!\rho_w g D sin(\alpha + \beta)$

The third term ($\tau_b$, the shear strength at the base of the wedge) can be given by the criterion of Mohr-Coulomb:

$$\!\tau_b = S_0 + \mu(\sigma_n - P_f)$$

In which S_{0} is the cohesion of the material at the base, $\mu$ is the coefficient of internal friction, $\sigma_n$ is the normal stress and P_{f} is the pore fluid pressure. These parameters determine the resistance to shear at the base.

=== Mechanical equilibrium ===
Mechanical equilibrium means the resisting forces equal the push. This can be written as:

$$\rho g H sin\beta + \rho_w g D sin(\alpha + \beta) + \tau_b = \frac{d}{dx}\int_{0}^{H}\sigma_x dz$$

The pushing force is here assumed to be working on the total height of the wedge. Therefore, it is written as the integral of the force over the wedge height, where z is the direction perpendicular to the base of the wedge and parallel to vector H.
