= Fahlband =

Stratum in crystalline rock, containing metallic minerals

Fahlband (from the German fahl for "faded" + band, German pronunciation: [ˈfaːlbant]) is a stratum in crystalline rock, containing metallic minerals.

Mineralized portions of shear zones that are formed as a result of cavity filling or metasomatic replacement are described as fahlbands.
