= List of minerals by optical properties =

Optical properties of common minerals
Name	Crystal system	Indicatrix	Optical sign	Birefringence	Color in plain polars
Anorthite	Triclinic	Biaxial	(-)	0.013	None
Biotite	Monoclinic	Biaxial	(-)	0.045	Brown
Calcite	Hexagonal	Uniaxial	(-)	1.486	None
Chlorite	Monoclinic triclinic	Biaxial	(-) or (+)	0.011	Pale green
Cinnabar	Trigonal	Uniaxial	(+)	0.351	None
Corundum	Trigonal	Uniaxial	(-)	0.09	None
Cristobalite	Tetragonal (pseudoisometric)	Uniaxial	(-)	0.003	None
Enstatite	Orthorhombic	Biaxial	(+)	0.011	None
Epidote	Monoclinic	Biaxial	(-)	0.046	None
Garnet	Cubic	None (isotropic)	N/A	N/A	None
Glauconite	Monoclinic	Biaxial	(-)	0.032	Light blue
Glaucophane	Monoclinic	Biaxial	(-)	0.021	Pleochroic blue
Microcline	Triclinic	Biaxial	(-)	0.010	None
Muscovite	Monoclinic	Biaxial	(-)	0.042	None
Olivine	Orthorhombic	Biaxial	(-) or (+)	0.042	Colorless to pale green
Orthoclase	Monoclinic	Biaxial	(-)	0.005	None
Quartz (α)	Hexagonal (trigonal)	Uniaxial	(+)	0.009	None
Sanidine	Monoclinic	Biaxial	(-)	0.007	None
Talc	Triclinic	Biaxial	(-)	0.051	None

== See also ==
- List of minerals
