= Polyacrylic acid =

Anionic polyelectrolyte polymer

Poly(acrylic acid)

Names
- IUPAC name Poly(acrylic acid), poly(1-carboxyethylene)
- Other names PAA, PAAc, Acrysol, Acumer, Alcosperse, Aquatreat, Carbomer, Sokalan

Identifiers
CAS Number	9003-01-4
ChEBI	CHEBI:51133
ChemSpider	none
ECHA InfoCard	100.115.375
EC Number	618-347-7
KEGG	C19501
UNII	73861X4K5F (8000 MW)
CompTox Dashboard (EPA)	DTXSID50873988

Properties
Chemical formula	(C_{3}H_{4}O_{2})_{n}
Molar mass	variable
log P	0.25700

Hazards
- GHS labelling
Pictograms	(GHS07: Exclamation mark)
Signal word	Warning
Hazard statements	H315, H319, H335
NFPA 704 (fire diamond)	0 0 0
- Except where otherwise noted, data are given for materials in their standard state (at 25 °C [77 °F], 100 kPa). verify (what is ?) Infobox references

Poly(acrylic acid) (PAA; trade name Carbomer) is a polymer with the formula (CH_{2}−CHCO_{2}H)_{n}. It is a derivative of acrylic acid (CH_{2}=CHCO_{2}H). In addition to the homopolymers, a variety of copolymers and crosslinked polymers, and partially deprotonated derivatives thereof, are known and of commercial value. In a water solution at neutral pH, PAA is an anionic polymer, i.e., many of the side chains of PAA lose their protons and acquire a negative charge. Partially or wholly deprotonated PAAs are polyelectrolytes, with the ability to absorb and retain water and swell to many times their original volume. These properties – acid–base and water-attracting – are the basis of many applications.

== Synthesis ==
PAA, like any acrylate polymer, is usually synthesized through a process known as free radical polymerization, though graft polymerization may also be used. Free radical polymerization involves the conversion of monomers, in this case, acrylic acid (CH_{2}=CHCO_{2}H), into a polymer chain through the action of free radicals. The process typically follows these steps:

1. Initiation: Free radicals are generated by initiators such as potassium persulfate (K_{2}S_{2}O_{8}) or Azobisisobutyronitrile (AIBN). These radicals are highly reactive and can start the polymerization process by reacting with the monomer units.
2. Propagation: Once the radical reacts with a monomer, it creates a new radical at the end of the growing chain. This new radical can react with additional monomer units, allowing the chain to grow.
3. Termination: The reaction continues until two radicals recombine, or a radical is transferred to another molecule, terminating the growth of the polymer chain.
4. Chain transfer and inhibition: Other reactions can also occur, such as chain transfer (where the radical is transferred to a different molecule, creating a new radical) or inhibition (where impurities stop the growth of the chain).

== Structure and derivatives ==
Polyacrylic acid is a weak anionic polyelectrolyte, whose degree of ionisation is dependent on solution pH. In its non-ionised form at low pHs, PAA may associate with various non-ionic polymers (such as polyethylene oxide, poly-N-vinyl pyrrolidone, polyacrylamide, and some cellulose ethers) and form hydrogen-bonded interpolymer complexes. In aqueous solutions PAA can also form polycomplexes with oppositely charged polymers such as chitosan, surfactants, and drug molecules (for example, streptomycin).

== Physical properties ==
Dry PAAs are sold as white, fluffy powders.

== Derivatives ==
In the dry powder form of sodium polyacrylate, the positively charged sodium ions are bound to the polyacrylate, however, in aqueous solutions the sodium ions can dissociate. The presence of sodium cations allows the polymer to absorb a high amount of water.

== Applications ==
=== Absorbent ===
PAA is widely used in dispersants. Its molecular weight has a significant impact on the rheological properties and dispersion capacity, and hence applications. The dominant application for PAA is as a superabsorbent. About 25% of PAA is used for detergents and dispersants.

Polyacrylic acid and its derivatives (particularly sodium polyacrylate) are used in disposable diapers. Acrylic acid is also the main component of Superabsorbent Polymers (SAPs), which are cross-linked polyacrylates that can absorb and retain more than 100 times of their own weight in liquid. The US Food and Drug Administration authorized the use of SAPs in packaging with indirect food contact.

=== Cleaning ===
Detergents often contain copolymers of acrylic acid that assist in sequestering dirt. Cross-linked polyacrylic acid has also been used in the production of household products, including floor cleaners. PAA may inactivate the antiseptic chlorhexidine gluconate.

=== Biocompatible materials ===
The neutralized polyacrylic acid gels are suitable biocompatible matrices for medical applications such as gels for skin care products. PAA films can be deposited on orthopaedic implants to protect them from corrosion. Crosslinked hydrogels of PAA and gelatin have also been used as medical glue.

=== Paints and cosmetics ===
Other applications involve paints and cosmetics. They stabilize suspended solid in liquids, prevent emulsions from separating, and control the consistency in flow of cosmetics. Carbomer codes (910, 934, 940, 941, and 934P) are an indication of molecular weight and the specific components of the polymer. For many applications PAAs are used in form of alkali metal or ammonium salts, e.g. sodium polyacrylate.

=== Rock analogs for structural geology ===
Polyacrylic acid can be used as a rock analog for structural geology.

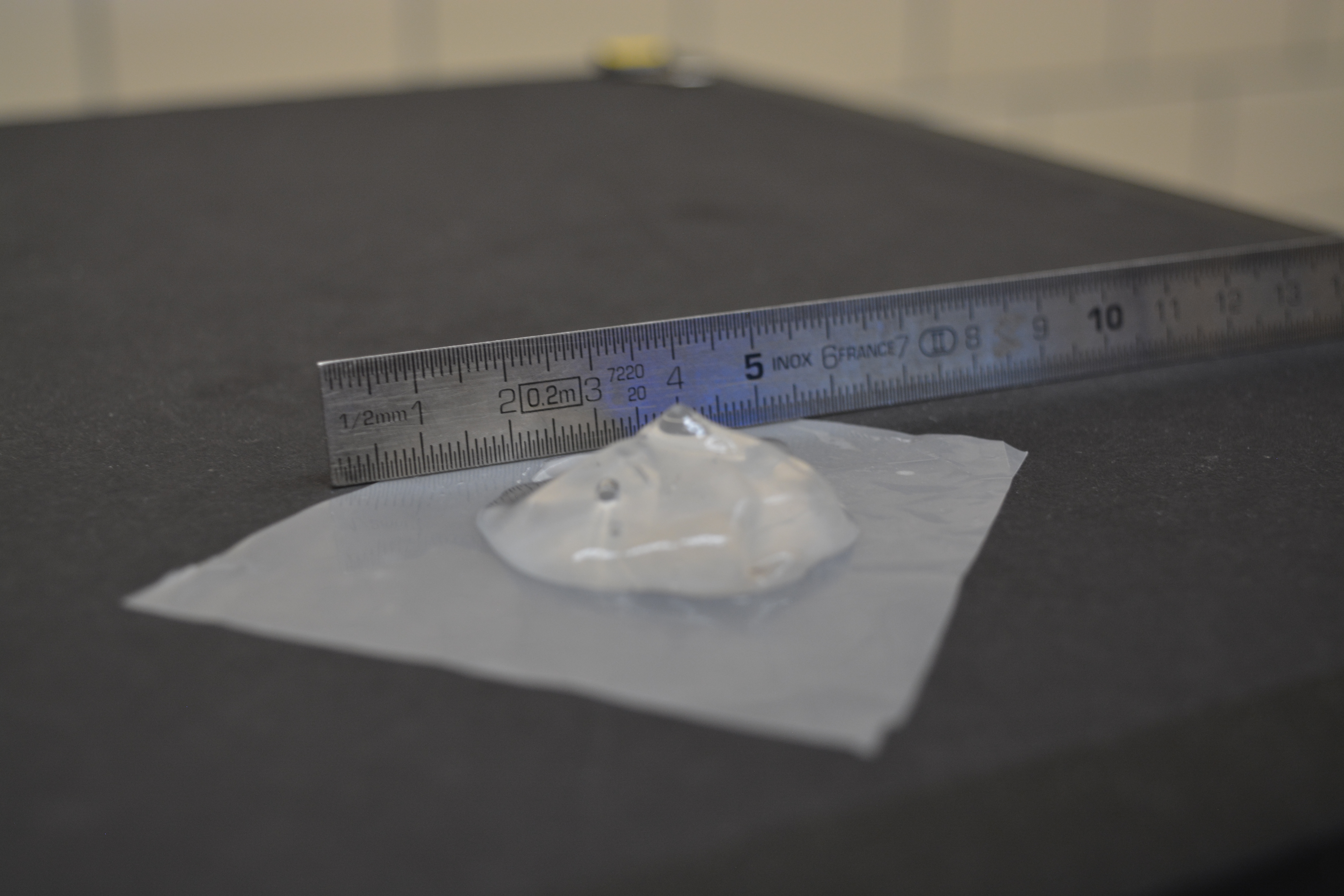
Carbopol being used in geological modeling experiments

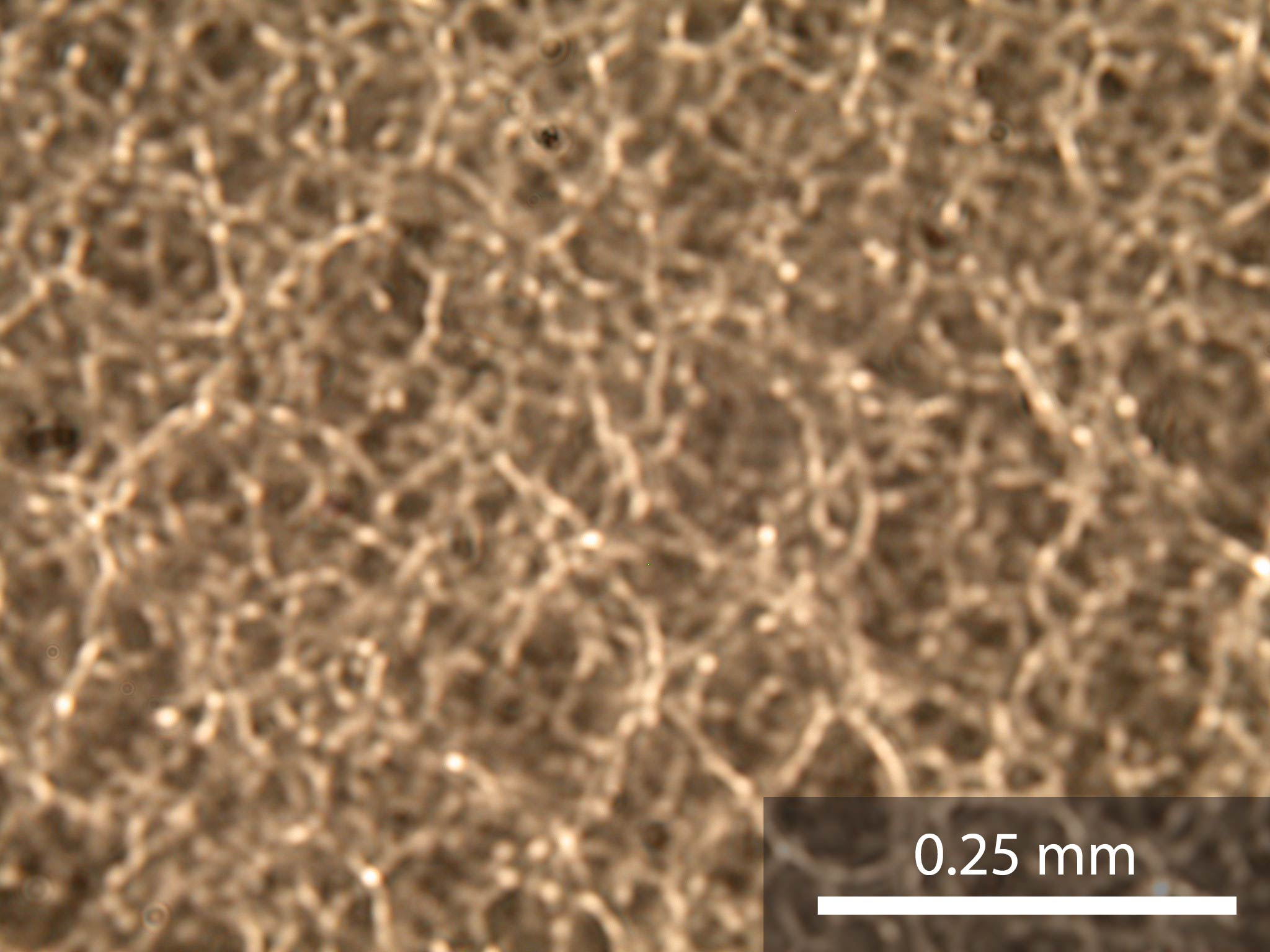
A micro-photograph of the modeling material carbopol

=== Emerging applications ===
Hydrogels derived from PAA have attracted much study for use as bandages and aids for wound healing. PAA has also shown promising results when being investigated as a possible water soluble electrode binder for Li-ion battery applications.

=== Drilling fluid and metal quenching ===
A few reports were made on PAA use as deflocculant (so called alkaline polyacrylates) for oil drilling industry.

It was also reported to be used for metal quenching in metalworking (see Sodium polyacrylate).
