= Analogue modelling (geology) =

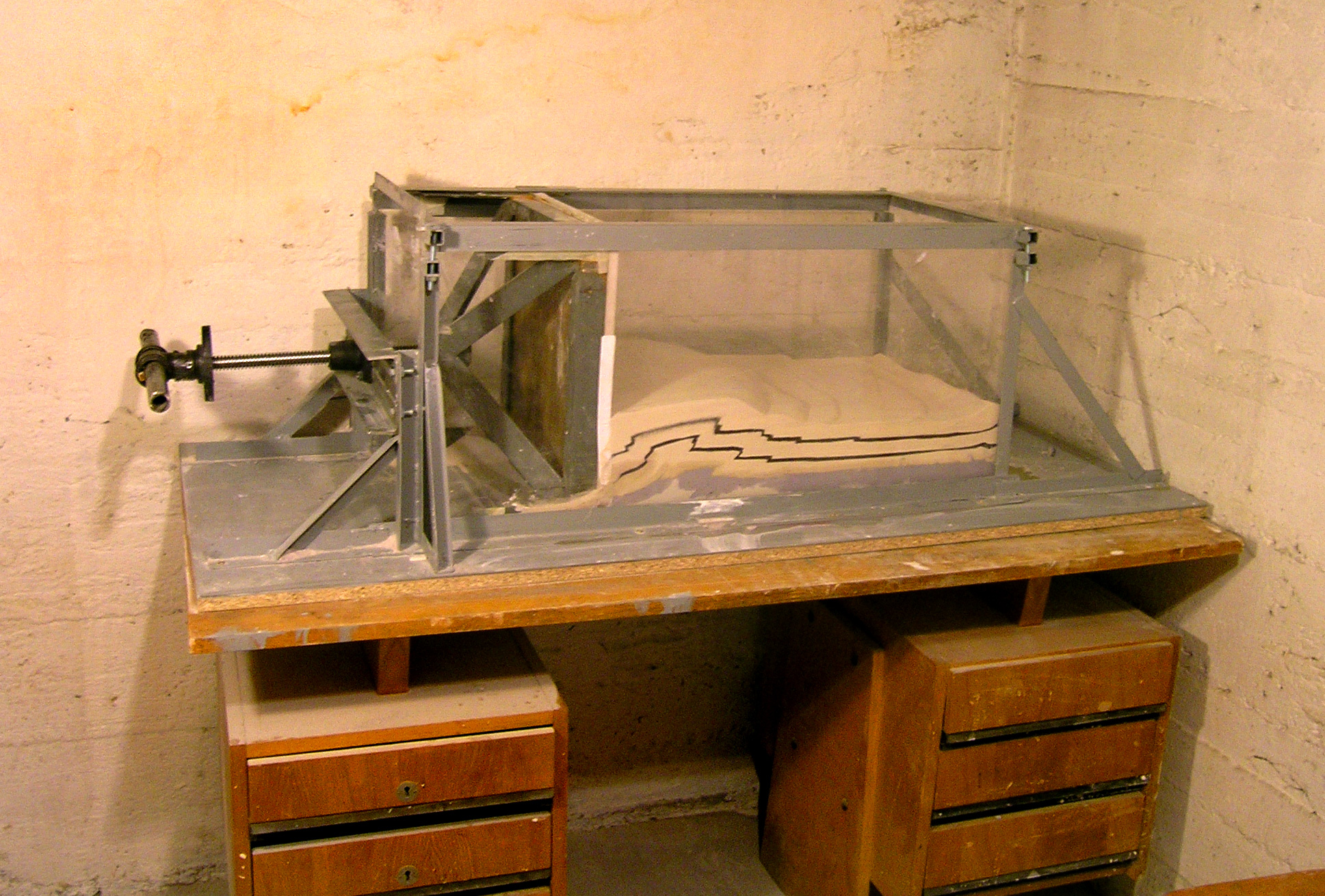
Pure shear sandbox model of thrust fault formation

Analogue modelling is a laboratory experimental method using uncomplicated physical models (such as a sandbox) with certain simple scales of time and length to model geological scenarios and simulate geodynamic evolutions.

There are numerous limitations affecting the direct study of the Earth. Firstly, the timescales of geodynamic processes are exceptionally long (millions of years), and most of the processes started long before human records. Secondly, the length scales of geodynamic processes are enormous (thousands of kilometres), and most of them happen at depth within the Earth. Thus, scientists began making proportional small-scale simulations of features in the natural world to test geological ideas. Analogue models can directly show the whole structural pattern in 3D and cross-section. They are helpful in understanding the internal structures and the progressive development of Earth's deforming regions.

Analogue modelling has been widely used for geodynamic analysis and to illustrate the development of different geological phenomena. Models can explore small-scale processes, such as folding and faulting, or large-scale processes, such as tectonic movement and interior Earth structures.

== History ==
Lateral compression machine made by James Hall to model geological folding. This machine is still present in the Royal Society of Edinburgh. The materials squeezed in the box are blankets or layers of clay.

Analogue modelling has a development history of over 200 years.

It has been used since at least 1812, when James Hall squeezed layers of clay to produce folds similar to those that he had studied at an outcrop. This idea of modelling led to many other small-scale studies, such as fault-propagation fold, thrust fault, and folds in the late 19th century. These studies were all qualitative.

King Hubbert came up with the theory of scaling in 1937, meaning that the study of analogue modelling became quantitative. The quantitative approach was further developed by many scientists later. As the field of geodynamic study expanded, analogue modelling increased, especially for large-scale geological processes. Examples include proto-subduction subduction in plate tectonics, collision, diapirism, and rifting.

== Components ==
Analogue model of caldera formation using flour to represent the upper part of the crust and a balloon to represent the inflating magma chamber

=== Scaling ===
In 1937 King Hubbert described the key principles for scaling analogue models. He defined three types of similarity between models and the natural world: geometric, kinematic and dynamic.

==== Geometric similarity ====
To be geometrically similar, lengths in the model and natural example must be proportional and angles must be equal. When the length of a natural prototype (p) is $l_n^p$ (n=1, 2, 3...) and the angle is $\alpha_n^p$. Correspondingly, the length in the model (m) is $l_n^m$ and the angle is $\alpha_n^m$. They need to conform to the following formulas:

$\frac{l_1^m}{l_1^p}=\frac{l_2^m}{l_2^p}=\frac{l_3^m}{l_3^p}=\frac{l_n^m}{l_n^p}$ & $\alpha_n^m=\alpha_n^p$

For example, 1 centimetre in the model represents 1 kilometre in nature.

==== Kinematic similarity ====
To be kinematically similar, they must be geometrically similar and the time needed for changes to occur must be proportional. When the required time for changing is $t_n$:

$\frac{t_1^m}{t_1^p}=\frac{t_2^m}{t_2^p}=\frac{t_3^m}{t_3^p}=\frac{t_n^m}{t_n^p}$

For example, 1 second in the model represents 1 thousand years in the nature.

As is known: $v=\frac{l}{t}$, the velocities ($v$) can be scaled by the following equation:

$v^p=v^m\frac{l^pt^m}{l^mt^p}$

==== Dynamic similarity ====
When the models and the natural world are geometrically and kinematically similar, dynamic similarity additionally requires that the various forces acting on a point in the model are proportional to those at a corresponding point in nature. When the forces ($F_n$) acting on the system are $F_g$ (gravity), $F_v$ (viscous force), and $F_f$ (friction):

$\frac{F_g^m}{F_g^p}=\frac{F_v^m}{F_v^p}=\frac{F_f^m}{F_f^p}=\frac{F_n^m}{F_n^p}$

However, since the forces acting in the nature are unmeasurable, it is impossible to scale the forces and stresses directly. Scientists have been using different formulas to convert forces into the parameters that can be measured. Cauchy momentum equation is usually used for showing the relationship between forces and densities ($\rho$ is density):

$\frac{F^m}{F^p}=\frac{\rho^m(l^m)^3}{\rho^p(l^p)^3}$(Generating from Cauchy momentum equation)

Stokes' law is usually used for showing the relationship between forces and density contrasts ($\Delta\rho$ is density constant):

$\frac{F^m}{F^p}=\frac{\Delta\rho^m(l^m)^3}{\Delta\rho^p(l^p)^3}$(Generating from Stokes' law)

(While the gravitational acceleration $g^m=g^p$)

Since the densities and density contrasts are proportional to forces and stresses, it is easy to scale densities or density contrasts instead of scaling forces and stresses.

However, these two equations can lead to different topography scales.

The simple analogue modelling of the fold-thrust belt system taken in the Nanjing University physical laboratory. The white and blue materials are quartz sands.

=== Experimental apparatus ===
Different geodynamic processes are simulated by different experimental apparatus.

For example, lateral compression machines are commonly used in simulating deformations involving lithospheric shortening, such as folding, thrust faulting, collision, and subduction. Longitudinal compression machines are usually used for fracturing. There is a large variety of devices based on the different sources of forces applied to the material. Some devices have multiple forcing systems because nature is not homogeneous.

=== Lab environment ===
==== Systems ====
For experimental systems, the energy can be supplied externally (at the boundary) and internally (buoyancy forces). If the deformation is only caused by internal forces, it is a closed system. Conversely, if the deformations are caused by external forces or a combination of internal and external forces, it is an open system.

For the open system, the extrusion or stretching forces are imposed externally. However, the buoyancy forces can be generated both externally or internally. The materials and thermal energy can be added to or remove from the system. For the closed system, there is no energy and materials added to the system. Thus, all the deformations are caused by internal buoyancy forces. Only buoyancy-driven deformation can be simulated in a closed system.

==== Gravity field ====
The simple analogue modelling of a subduction zone. The materials this model uses are sand mixture and silicone putty for the continental crust (left in layered brown) and oceanic crust (right in layered brown), and glucose syrup for the asthenosphere (greenish-blue liquid in the glass tank). There is a heater in the tank for heating the liquid.

Because the major research object of analogue modelling is Earth, the gravity field that most experiments utilize is ordinarily the Earth's field of gravity. However, many models are carried out using simulated gravity, for example, by use of a centrifuge. These technologies are usually used in studying development of gravity-controlled structures, such as dome formation, and diapirism.

=== Materials ===
Analogue modelling uses various materials, such as sand, clay, silicone and paraffin wax. Different materials came into use for quantitative analysis of analogue modelling experiments, compared to qualitative analysis. Before Hubbert's scaling theory, scientists used natural materials (e.g. clays, soil, and sand) for analogue modelling. For large-scale simulation, analogue modelling should have geometric, kinematic, and dynamic similarity with nature. If the model has these similarities, results from simulation will be more accurate. All these different materials represent the natural features of Earth (such as crust, mantle, and river). Selection of analogue materials is difficult, because of the largely rheology-dependent deformation and inconstant rheology influenced by the thermal gradient in nature. The rheological characteristic of internal layering was developed by the study of seismology and geochemistry.

To simulate layers with different properties, different materials are chosen:

Materials for analogue modelling
Categories		Examples	Simulation
Granular materials (various in density, shape, and size)		Quartz sand, glass microbeads, feldspar powder	Brittle upper crust
Low-viscous materials		Water, sugar solution, honey	Asthenosphere, Sub-lithospheric mantle
Low-viscous materials		Corn syrup, glucose syrup	Sinking slabs
High linear viscous materials		Syrup, silicone putty	Ductile lithosphere
Visco-elastic materials		Amorphous polymers, biopolymers, bitumen	
Non-linear viscous materials	Plastic materials	Plasticine	
Non-linear viscous materials	Visco-plastic materials	Wax, paraffin	
Non-linear viscous materials	Visco-elasto-plastic materials	Gelatin	

== Advantages ==
There are many useful properties of analogue modelling:

1. Analogue models can directly show whole geodynamic processes from start to finish.
2. Geodynamic processes can be stopped at any time for investigation, and allow the study of 3D structures.
3. The scales of the model can be controlled in a practicable range for the laboratory.
4. The simulation can show different results of geodynamic processes by altering the parameters, and the influence of each parameter is clarified.
5. The results of analogue modelling can be directly used for interpreting nature if the accuracy of the model is high.
6. Analogue modelling can provide new ways of thinking about geological problems.

== Disadvantages ==
Because analogue modelling involves the simplification of geodynamic processes, it also has several disadvantages and limitations:

1. The study of natural rock properties still needs more research. The more accurate the input data, the more accurate the analogue modelling.
2. There are many more factors in nature that affect the geodynamic processes (such as isostatic compensation and erosion), and these are most likely heterogeneous systems. Thus they are challenging for simulations (some factors are not even known).
3. The variation of natural rocks is greater than in simulated materials; therefore it is difficult to fully model the real situation.
4. Analogue modelling cannot simulate chemical reactions.
5. There are systematic errors in the apparatus, and random errors due to human factors.

== Applications ==
Simple analogue modelling of the growth and erosion of an orogenic wedge. This simulation is done in a glass tank, with layered different granular materials that represent the crust.

Analogue modelling can be used to simulate different geodynamic processes and geological phenomena, such as small-scale problems – folding, fracturing, boudinage and shear zone, and large-scale problems – subduction, collision, diapirism, and mantle convection. The following are some examples of applications of analogue modelling.

=== Compressional tectonics ===
The first analogue model was built by James Hall for simulating folds. He used a lateral compression machine for the simulation, and this machine is still shown in the Royal Society of Edinburgh. The final result from the model is quite close to observation of the Berwickshire coast. Although the model he used is simpler than current ones, the idea remains in use.

The use of more complex compression machines substantially increases the number of simulations of compressional tectonics, including subduction, collision, lithospheric shortening, fracture formation, thrust and accretionary wedge. If the simulation only focuses on the upper crustal, the model is always built in the glass box (or two lateral glass walls) with a piston and/or wedges to supply forces to layers of granular materials (normally called sandbox). Depending on the different natural features, erosion (removal of top materials at a certain angle), décollement (inserted layers with low cohesion, normally glass microbeads), and any other parameters can put into the model, producing various results.

Simulations of mantle influences vary. Because of the different physical and chemical properties between the asthenosphere and lithosphere, viscous materials and a heater (for mantle convection) are also used.

The simple analogue modelling of the extension tectonics which showing the formation of normal fault and salt dome (diapirism). This model is built in a glass box. The darker greyish layer is silicone which represents salt, and brownish layers are dry quartz sands which represent the brittle sedimentary rocks.

=== Extensional tectonics ===
Compression machines can also be used in reverse for simulating extensional tectonics, such as lithospheric extension, the formation of rifts, normal faulting, boudinage and diapirs. These models can also be built in a glass box which is similar to the above, but instead of thrust force, tensile force is applied.

=== Strike-slip tectonics ===
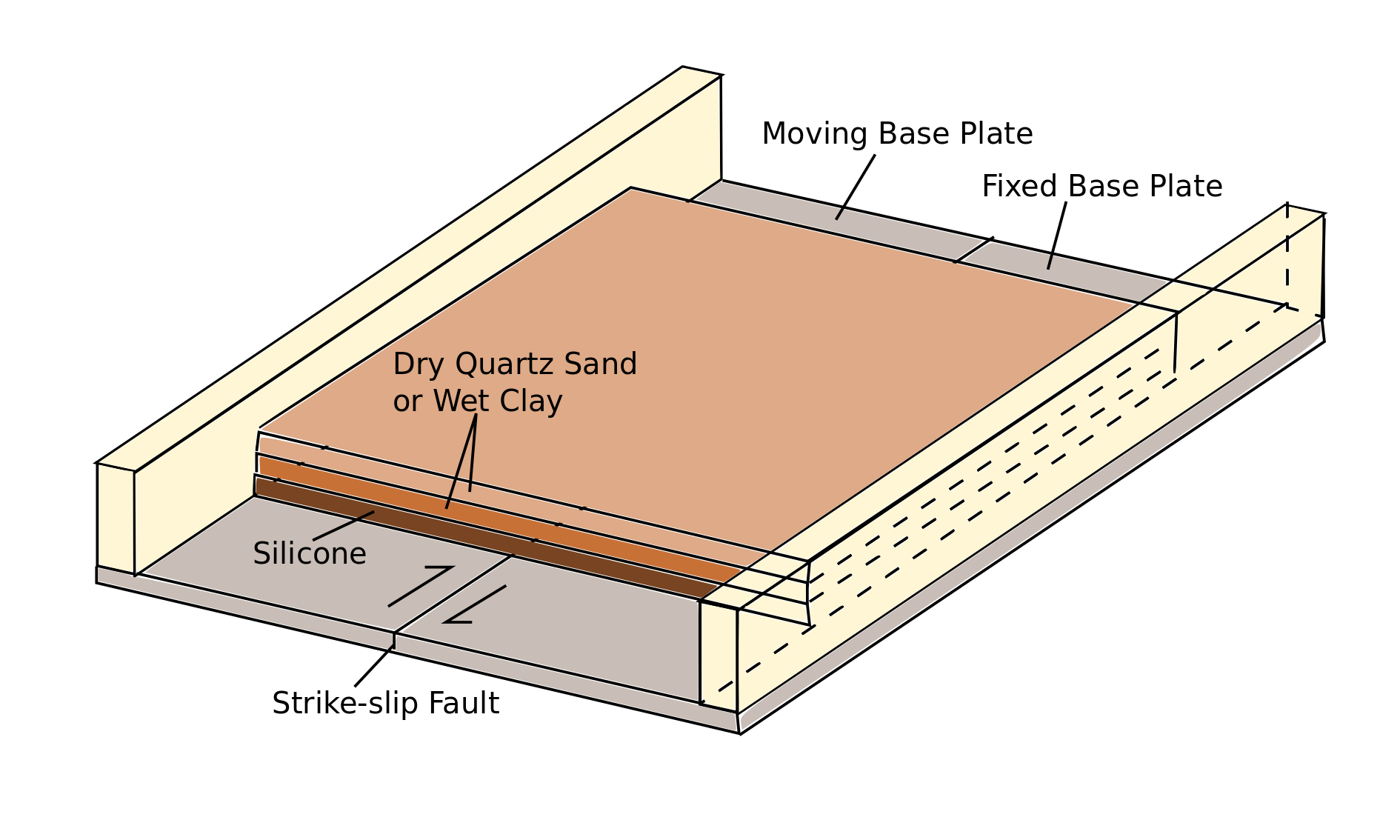
The simplified analogue modelling setting of shear deformation. This model is built on two separate horizontal plates. The brownish layers are dry sand, wet clay, and viscous materials, such as silicone or polydimethylsiloxane.

Strike-slip tectonics differ from the dominantly vertical crust movements associated with shortening and extension, being dominantly horizontal in character (in relative terms sinistral or dextral). This kind of horizontal movement will create a shear zone and several types of fractures and faults. A typical model used for strike-slip tectonics has two (or more) horizontal basal plates moving in opposite directions (or only move one of the plates, other are fixed). The visual results are shown from bird's-eye view. Scientists used CT-analysis to collect the cross-section images for the observation of the most influenced area during the simulation.

== See also ==
- Geologic modelling
- Numerical modeling (geology)
- Earth analog
