= Cataclysm =

Cataclysm may refer to:

== Common meanings ==
- Generally, any large-scale disaster
- Deluge (mythology)
- Doomsday event, see hypothetical risks to civilization, humans, and planet Earth
- A catastrophic natural event:
  - List of geological phenomena
  - Earthquake, the result of a sudden release of energy in the Earth's crust that creates seismic waves
  - Volcanic eruption

== Video games ==
- World of Warcraft: Cataclysm, an expansion pack of Blizzard Entertainment's World of Warcraft
- Cataclysm: Dark Days Ahead, an open-source cross-platform roguelike video game
- Homeworld: Cataclysm, a stand-alone expansion, of the Homeworld space-based RTS franchise

== Books and comics ==
- Cataclysm (Dragonlance), a fictional event in the Dragonlance novels
- Batman: Cataclysm, a DC Comics crossover story arc featuring Batman
- Cataclysm: The Ultimates' Last Stand, a 2013–2014 crossover storyline appearing in the Ultimate Marvel line of books
- Godzilla: Cataclysm, a miniseries from the Godzilla comics by IDW Publishing, see Godzilla (comics)#Miniseries

== Other uses ==
- A special ability used by Cat Noir, a character in Miraculous: Tales of Ladybug & Cat Noir
- "Cataclysm", a song by Au5 and Crystal Skies
- "Cataclysmic", a song by Joe Satriani from the 2015 album Shockwave Supernova
- Cataclysm (film), a 1980 American film

== See also ==
- Cataclysmic variable star, which irregularly increases in brightness by a large factor, then drops back down to a quiescent state (initially called nova)
- Cataclysmic pole shift hypothesis, pseudo-scientific claim of past rapid changes of Earth's axis
- Ekpyrosis, a conflagration
- Pyroclastic flow, fast-moving current of hot gas and volcanic matter
- Lahar, violent volcanic mudflow or debris flow
- Eschatology, part of theology concerned with the final events of history
- Kataklysm, Canadian death metal band
