= Weather front =

Boundary separating two masses of air of different densities

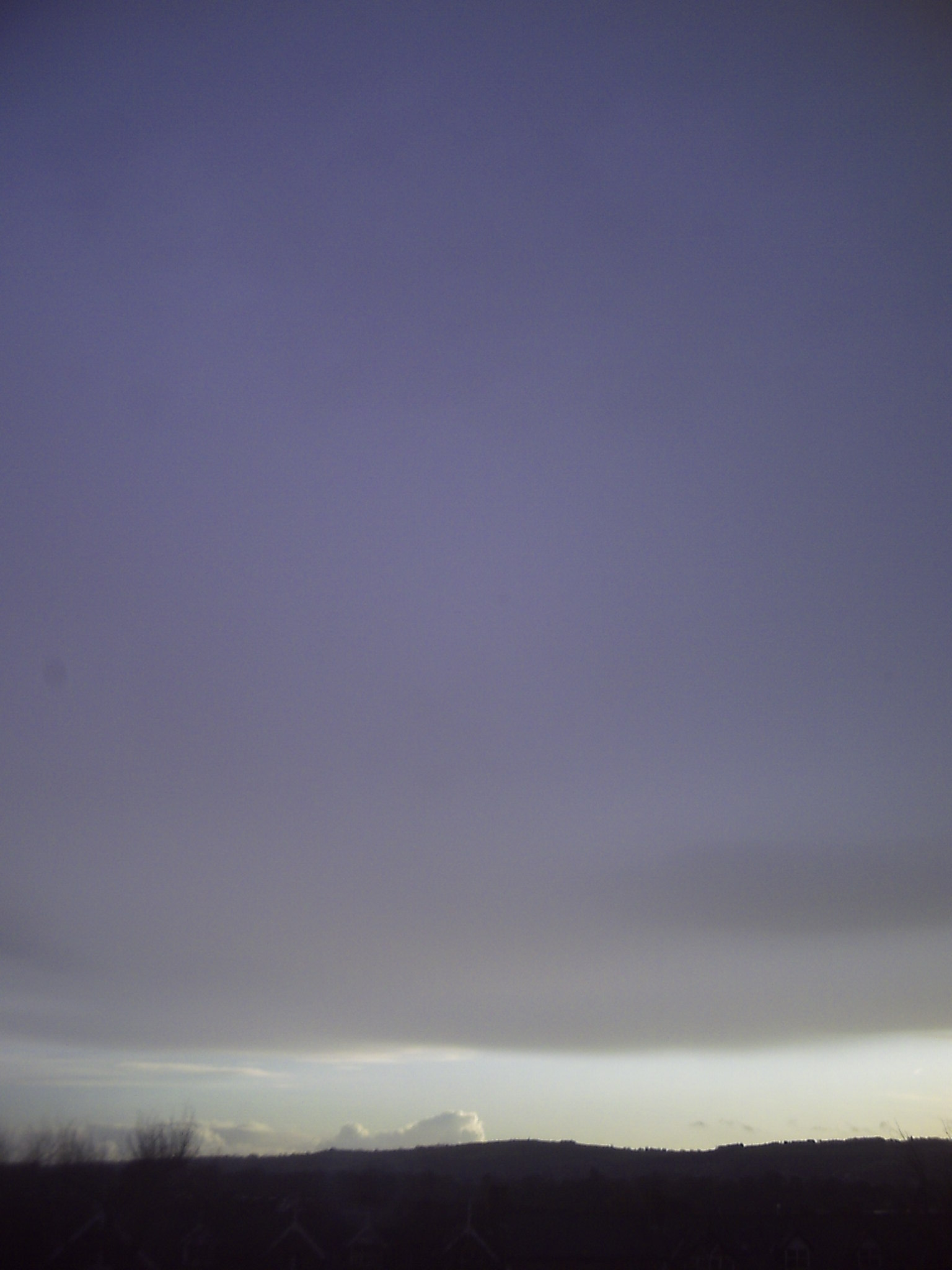
Approaching storm fronts are often visible from the ground, but are not always as well defined as this.

A weather front is a boundary separating air masses for which several characteristics differ, such as air density, wind, temperature, and humidity. Disturbed and unstable weather due to these differences often arises along the boundary. For instance, cold fronts can bring bands of thunderstorms and cumulonimbus precipitation or be preceded by squall lines, while warm fronts are usually preceded by stratiform precipitation and fog. In summer, subtler humidity gradients known as dry lines can trigger severe weather. Some fronts produce no precipitation and little cloudiness, although there is invariably a wind shift.

Cold fronts generally move from west to east, whereas warm fronts move poleward, although any direction is possible. Occluded fronts are a hybrid merge of the two, and stationary fronts are stalled in their motion. Cold fronts and cold occlusions move faster than warm fronts and warm occlusions because the dense air behind them can lift as well as push the warmer air. Mountains and bodies of water can affect the movement and properties of fronts, other than atmospheric conditions. When the density contrast has diminished between the air masses, for instance after flowing out over a uniformly warm ocean, the front can degenerate into a mere line which separates regions of differing wind velocity known as a shear line. This is most common over the open ocean.

== Bergeron classification of air masses ==
The Bergeron classification is the most widely accepted form of air mass classification. Air mass classifications are indicated by three letters: Fronts separate air masses of different types or origins, and are located along troughs of lower pressure.

- The first letter describes its moisture properties, with
  - c used for continental air masses (dry) and
  - m used for maritime air masses (moist).
- The second letter describes the thermal characteristic of its source region:
  - T for tropical,
  - P for polar,
  - A for Arctic or Antarctic,
  - M for monsoon,
  - E for equatorial, and
  - S for superior air (dry air formed by significant upward lift in the atmosphere).
- The third letter designates the stability of the atmosphere; it is labeled:
  - k if the air mass is colder ("kolder") than the ground below it.
  - w if the air mass is warmer than the ground below it.

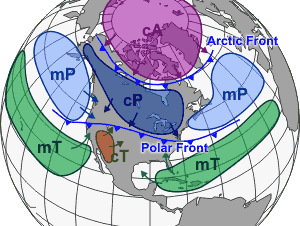
Different air masses which affect North America, as well as other continents, tend to be separated by frontal boundaries. In this illustration, the Arctic front separates Arctic from Polar air masses, while the Polar front separates Polar air from warm air masses. (cA is continental arctic; cP is continental polar; mP is maritime polar; cT is continental tropic; and mT is maritime tropic.)

== Surface weather analysis ==
Weather map symbols: 1. cold front; 2. warm front; 3. stationary front; 4. occluded front; 5. surface trough; 6. squall / shear line; 7. dry line; 8. tropical wave; 9. trough

A surface weather analysis is a special type of weather map which provides a top view of weather elements over a geographical area at a specified time based on information from ground-based weather stations. Weather maps are created by detecting, plotting and tracing the values of relevant quantities such as sea-level pressure, temperature, and cloud cover onto a geographical map to help find synoptic scale features such as weather fronts. Surface weather analyses have special symbols which show frontal systems, cloud cover, precipitation, or other important information. For example, an H may represent a high pressure area, implying fair or clear weather. An L on the other hand may represent low pressure, which frequently accompanies precipitation and storms. Low pressure also creates surface winds deriving from high pressure zones and vice versa. Various symbols are used not just for frontal zones and other surface boundaries on weather maps, but also to depict the present weather at various locations on the weather map. In addition, areas of precipitation help determine the frontal type and location.

== Types ==
There are two different meanings used within meteorology to describe weather around a frontal zone. The term "anafront" describes boundaries which show instability, meaning air rises rapidly along and over the boundary to cause significant weather changes and heavy precipitation. A "katafront" is weaker, bringing smaller changes in temperature and moisture, as well as limited rainfall.

=== Cold front ===
A cold front is located along and on the bounds of the warm side of a tightly packed temperature gradient. On surface analysis charts, this temperature gradient is visible in isotherms and can sometimes also be identified using isobars since cold fronts often align with a surface trough. On weather maps, the surface position of the cold front is marked by a blue line with triangles pointing in the direction where cold air travels and it is placed at the leading edge of the cooler air mass. Cold fronts often bring rain, and sometimes heavy thunderstorms as well. Cold fronts can produce sharper and more intense changes in weather and move at a rate that is up to twice as fast as warm fronts, since cold air is more dense than warm air, lifting as well as pushing the warm air preceding the boundary. The lifting motion often creates a narrow line of showers and thunderstorms if enough humidity is present as the lifted moist warm air condenses. The concept of colder, dense air "wedging" under the less dense warmer air is too simplistic, as the upward motion is really part of a maintenance process for geostrophic balance on the rotating Earth in response to frontogenesis.

=== Warm front ===
Warm fronts are at the leading edge of a homogeneous advancing warm air mass, which is located on the equatorward edge of the gradient in isotherms, and lie within broader troughs of low pressure than cold fronts. A warm front moves more slowly than the cold front which usually follows because cold air is denser and harder to lift from the Earth's surface.

This also forces temperature differences across warm fronts to be broader in scale. Clouds appearing ahead of the warm front are mostly stratiform, and rainfall more gradually increases as the front approaches. Fog can also occur preceding a warm frontal passage. Clearing and warming is usually rapid after frontal passage. If the warm air mass is unstable, thunderstorms may be embedded among the stratiform clouds ahead of the front, and after frontal passage thundershowers may still continue. On weather maps, the surface location of a warm front is marked with a red line of semicircles pointing in the direction the air mass is travelling.

=== Occluded front ===
Occluded front depiction for the Northern Hemisphere

An occluded front is formed when a cold front overtakes a warm front, and usually forms around mature low-pressure areas, including cyclones. The cold and warm fronts curve naturally poleward into the point of occlusion, which is also known as the triple point. It lies within a sharp trough, but the air mass behind the boundary can be either warm or cold. In a cold occlusion, the air mass overtaking the warm front is cooler than the cold air mass receding from the warm front and plows under both air masses. In a warm occlusion, the cold air mass overtaking the warm front is warmer than the cold air mass receding from the warm front and rides over the colder air while lifting the warm air.

A wide variety of weather can be found along an occluded front, with thunderstorms possible, but usually their passage is also associated with a drying of the air mass. Within the occlusion of the front, a circulation of air brings warm air upward and sends drafts of cold air downward, or vice versa depending on the type of occlusion the front is experiencing. Precipitations and clouds are associated with the trowal, the projection on the Earth's surface of the tongue of warm air aloft formed during the occlusion process of the depression or storm.

Occluded fronts are indicated on a weather map by a purple line with alternating half-circles and triangles pointing in direction of travel. The trowal is indicated by a series of blue and red junction lines.

=== Warm sector ===
The warm sector is a near-surface air mass in between the warm front and the cold front, usually found on the equatorward side of an extratropical cyclone. With its warm and humid characteristics, this air is susceptive to convective instability and can sustain thunderstorms, especially if lifted by the advancing cold front.

=== Stationary front ===
A stationary front is a non-moving (or stalled) boundary between two air masses, neither of which is strong enough to replace the other. They tend to remain essentially in the same area for extended periods of time, especially with parallel winds directions; They usually move in waves but not persistently. There is normally a broad temperature gradient behind the boundary with more widely spaced isotherm packing.

A wide variety of weather can be found along a stationary front, but usually clouds and prolonged precipitation are found there. Stationary fronts either dissipate after several days or devolve into shear lines, but they can transform into a cold or warm front if the conditions aloft change. Stationary fronts are marked on weather maps with alternating red half-circles and blue spikes pointing opposite to each other, indicating no significant movement.

When stationary fronts become smaller in scale and stabilizes in temperature, degenerating to a narrow zone where wind direction changes significantly over a relatively short distance, they become known as shearlines. A shearline is depicted as a line of red dots and dashes. Stationary fronts may bring light snow or rain for a long period of time.

=== Dry line ===
A similar phenomenon to a weather front is the dry line, which is the boundary between air masses with significant moisture differences instead of temperature. When the westerlies increase on the north side of surface highs, areas of lowered pressure will form downwind of north–south oriented mountain chains, leading to the formation of a lee trough. Near the surface during daylight hours, warm moist air is denser than dry air of greater temperature, and thus the warm moist air wedges under the drier air like a cold front. At higher altitudes, the warm moist air is less dense than the cooler dry air and the boundary slope reverses. In the vicinity of the reversal aloft, severe weather is possible, especially when an occlusion or triple point is formed with a cold front. A weaker form of the dry line seen more commonly is the lee trough, which displays weaker differences in moisture. When moisture pools along the boundary during the warm season, it can be the focus of diurnal thunderstorms.

The dry line may occur anywhere on earth in regions intermediate between desert areas and warm seas. The southern plains west of the Mississippi River in the United States are a particularly favored location. The dry line normally moves eastward during the day and westward at night. A dry line is depicted on National Weather Service (NWS) surface analyses as an orange line with scallops facing into the moist sector. Dry lines are one of the few surface fronts where the pips indicated do not necessarily reflect the direction of motion.

=== Squall line ===
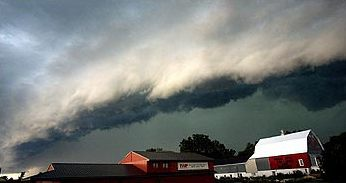
A shelf cloud such as this one can be a sign that a squall is imminent

Organized areas of thunderstorm activity not only reinforce pre-existing frontal zones, but can outrun actively existing cold fronts in a pattern where the upper level jet splits apart into two streams, with the resultant Mesoscale Convective System (MCS) forming at the point of the upper level split in the wind pattern running southeast into the warm sector parallel to low-level thickness lines. When the convection is strong and linear or curved, the MCS is called a squall line, with the feature placed at the leading edge of the significant wind shift and pressure rise. Even weaker and less organized areas of thunderstorms lead to locally cooler air and higher pressures, and outflow boundaries exist ahead of this type of activity, which can act as foci for additional thunderstorm activity later in the day.

These features are often depicted in the warm season across the United States on surface analyses and lie within surface troughs. If outflow boundaries or squall lines form over arid regions, a haboob may result. Squall lines are depicted on NWS surface analyses as an alternating pattern of two red dots and a dash labelled SQLN or squal line, while outflow boundaries are depicted as troughs with a label of outflow boundary.

== Precipitation produced ==
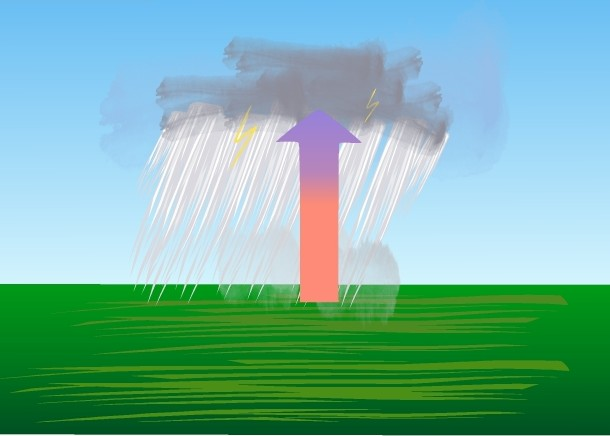
Convective precipitation

Fronts are the principal cause of significant weather. Convective precipitation (showers, thundershowers, heavy rain and related unstable weather) is caused by air being lifted and condensing into clouds by the movement of the cold front or cold occlusion under a mass of warmer, moist air. If the temperature differences of the two air masses involved are large and the turbulence is extreme because of wind shear and the presence of a strong jet stream, "roll clouds" and tornadoes may occur.

In the warm season, lee troughs, breezes, outflow boundaries and occlusions can lead to convection if enough moisture is available. Orographic precipitation is precipitation created through the lifting action of air due to air masses moving over terrain such as mountains and hills, which is most common behind cold fronts that move into mountainous areas. It may sometimes occur in advance of warm fronts moving northward to the east of mountainous terrain. However, precipitation along warm fronts is relatively steady, as in light rain or drizzle. Fog, sometimes extensive and dense, often occurs in pre-warm-frontal areas. Although, not all fronts produce precipitation or even clouds because moisture must be present in the air mass which is being lifted.

== Movement ==
Fronts are generally guided by winds aloft, but do not move as quickly. Cold fronts and occluded fronts in the Northern Hemisphere usually travel from the northwest to southeast, while warm fronts move more poleward with time. In the Northern Hemisphere a warm front moves from southwest to northeast. In the Southern Hemisphere, the reverse is true; a cold or occluded front usually moves from southwest to northeast, and a warm front moves from northwest to southeast. Movement is largely caused by the pressure gradient force (horizontal differences in atmospheric pressure) and the Coriolis effect, which is caused by Earth's spinning about its axis. Frontal zones can be slowed by geographic features like mountains and large bodies of warm water.

== See also ==
- Anticyclonic storm
- Atmosphere of Earth
- Atmospheric circulation
- Cold front
- Cyclogenesis
- Extratropical cyclone
- Hadley cell
- Norwegian cyclone model
- Surface weather analysis
- Trough (meteorology)
- Warm front
