= Rock analogs for structural geology =

Materials used to simulate geological processes

This is a compilation of the properties of different analog materials used to simulate deformational processes in structural geology. Such experiments are often called analog or analogue models. The organization of this page follows the review of rock analog materials in structural geology and tectonics of Reber et al. 2020.

== Materials used to simulate upper crustal deformation ==
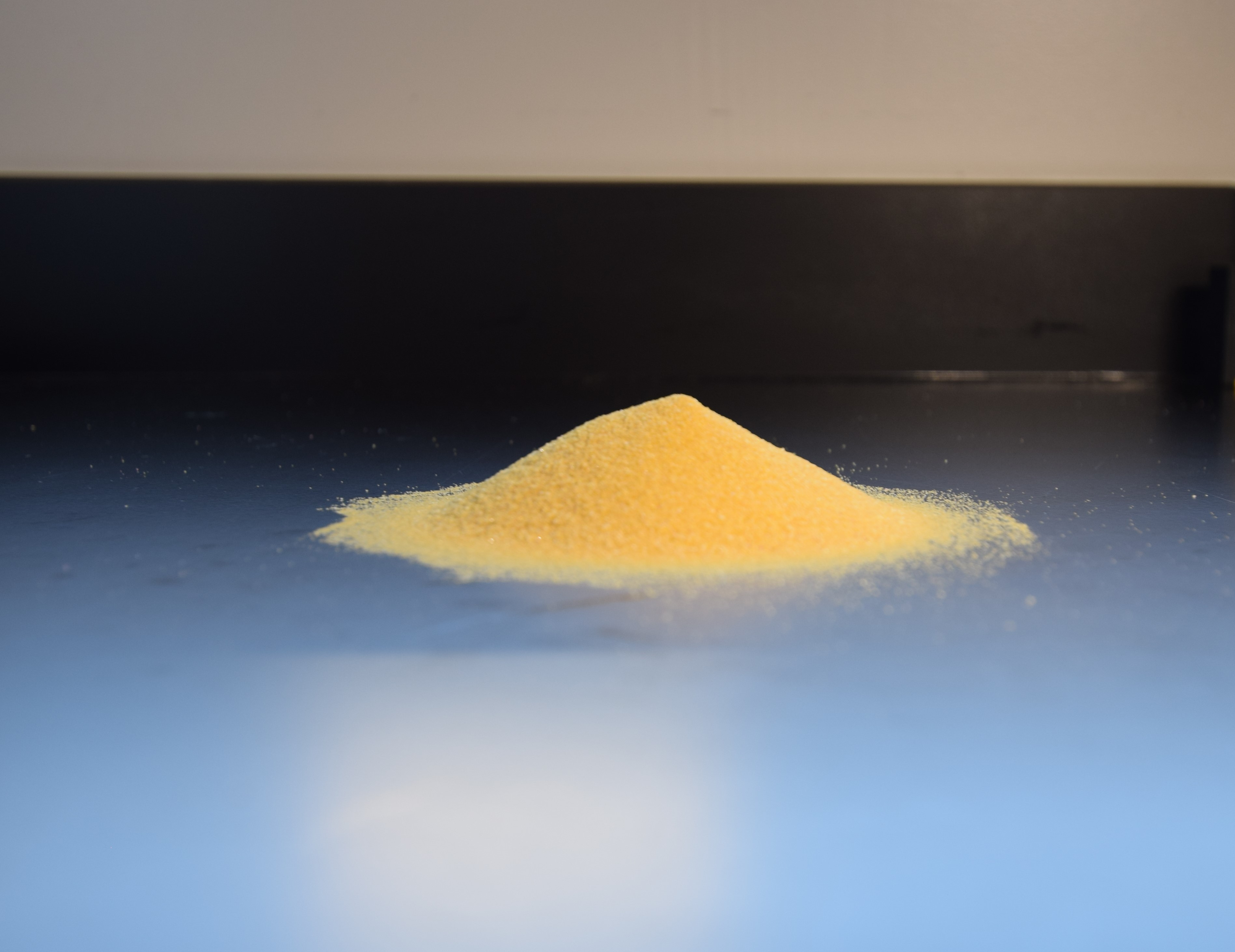
A sample of light colored, fine grained sand that has been used in analog experiments. Other sands have various grain sizes, colors and compositions.

These materials need to exhibit brittle deformation upon failure as well as elastic and viscous deformation before failure.

=== Materials that simulate upper crustal deformation ===
Material	Applications	Studies
Plexiglas and glass	Plexiglas and glass is useful for many applications. Some of which are: stress analysis of grains; fracturing; earthquake dynamics	Erdogan & Sih 1963; Thomas and Pollard 1993; Cooke & Pollard,1996; Daniels & Hayman, 2008; Lu, Lapusta & Rosakis, 2007; Owens & Daniels, 2011; Rubino, Rosakis, & Lapusta, 2019
Gelatin	Gelatin has been used to simulate: tensile fracturing; thrust faults; dyke and sill emplacement	Bot, vanAmerongon, Groot, Hoekstra, & Agterof, 1996; Brizzi, Funiciello, Corbi, Di Giuseppe, & Mojoli, 2016; Canon-Tapia and Merle, 2006; Corbi et al., 2011; Corbi et al., 2013; Di Giuseppe et al., 2009; Hyndman & Alt, 1987; Kavanagh, Menand, & Daniels, 2013; Kavanagh, Menand, & Sparks, 2006; Kervyn, Ernst, de Vires, Mathieu, & Jacobs, 2009; Kobchenko et al., 2014; Lee, Reber, Hayman, & Wheeler, 2016; Menand & Tait, 2002; Pollard, 1973; Rivalta, Bottinger, & Dahm, 2005; Touvet, Balmforth, Craster, & Sutherland, 2011; van Otterloo & Cruden, 2016
Foam	Foam is mostly used as an analog simulating elastic loading on the crust between earthquake events. If the foam used has a low stiffness, it can be dynamically scaled to preexisting fault surfaces' and earthquake cycles	Anooshehpoor & Brune, 1999; Anooshehpoor, Heaton, Shi & Brune, 1999; Brune,1973; Caniven et al., 2015; Rosenau et al., 2017; Rosenau, Lohrmann, & Oncken, 2009; Rosenau & Oncken, 2009
Clays	Clay is used to simulate deformation in the upper crust through distributed deformation and localized failure. The properties of clay depend on the mineralogy, grain size distribution and water content.	Bonanno, et al., 2017; Bonini et al., 2016; Cooke and van der Elst, 2012; DeGroot & Lunne, 2007; Eisenstadt & Sims, 2005; Hatem, Cooke, & Toeneboehn, 2017; Henza, Withjack, & Schlische, 2010; Kenny, 1967; Mitra & Paul, 2011; Paul & Mitra, 2013; Toeneboehn, 2017; Toeneboehn, 2018; White, 1949; Withjack, Henza, & Schlische, 2017

=== Dry granular materials ===
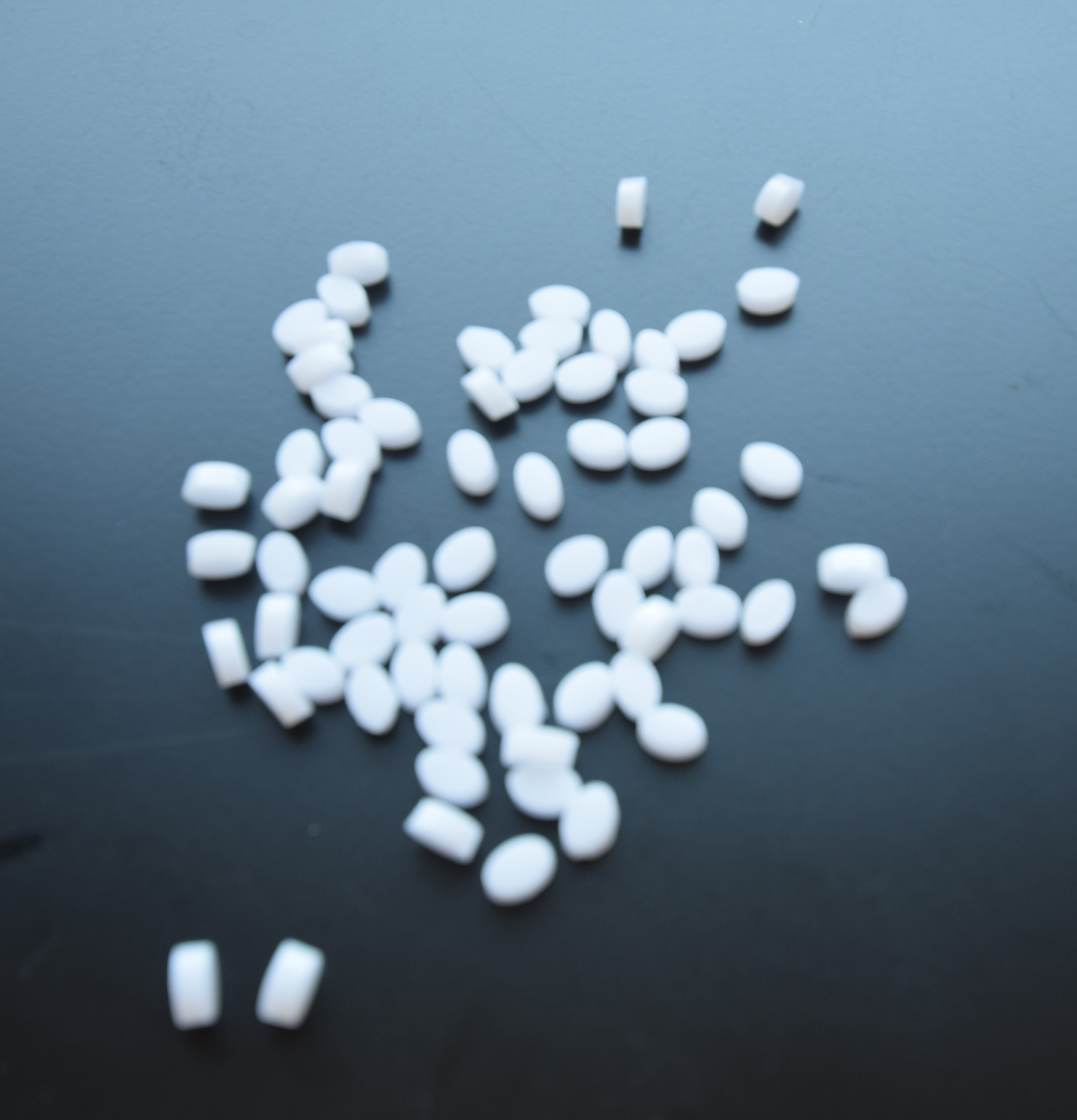
This is a picture of white plastic beads used as a material in analog experiments.

Material		Applications	Studies
Sand		During deformation, sand exhibits distributed deformation, compaction followed by dilatation, prior to failure via grain rearrangement. Sand is often used to simulate folding or faulting.	Abdelmalak et al., 2016; Cobbold, Durand, & Mourgues, 2001; Daniels & Hayman, 2008; Davis, Suppe, & Dahlen,1983; Galland, Burchardt, Hallot, Mourgues, & Bulois, 2014; Galland, Cobbold, Hallot, d'Ars, & Delavaud, 2006; Gomes, 2013; Hayman, Ducloue, Foco, & Daniels, 2011; Herbert et al., 2015; Lohrmann et al, 2003; Panien, Buiter, Schreurs, & Pfiffner, 2006; Rosenau et al., 2009
Micro beads		Micro beads are useful for: Situations where low friction and mechanical layering are desired in crustal and lithospheric models; Salt tectonic modeling because of adjustable density	Boutelier, Schrank, & Cruden, 2008; Dooley, Jackson, & Hudec, 2007; Dooley, Jackson, & Hudec, 2009; Duffy et al., 2018; Hudec, Jackson, & Schttltz-Ela, 2009; Jackson et al., 2019 Rossi & Storti, 2003; Schellart, 2000
Other	Lentils	Lentils have been used to study the distribution of shear surfaces observed in clay rich sediments.	Tarling & Rowe, 2016
Other	Crushed Walnut Shells	Crushed walnut shells have been used for their low density and non-abrasive nature.	Cruz, Teyssier, Perg, Take, & Fayon, 2008
Other	Poppy Seeds	Poppy seeds were used in an analog model as particles in suspension for determining the yield strength of subliquidus basalt.	Hoover, Cashman, & Manga, 2001
Other	Rice	Rice has been used to simulate earthquakes and fault roughness.	Rosenau et al., 2009
Other	Sugar	Sugar has been used: In subduction earthquake cycle models; As an analog for the brittle upper crust	Moore, Vendeville, & Wiltschko, 2005; Rosenau et al., 2009; Schellart, 2000; Schellart & Strak, 2016
Other	Sand-hemihydrate calcium sulphate	Sand-hemihydrate calcium sulphate mixtures, in different mixing ratios, are used as an "ultra-weak" sandstone to simulate fault and fracture processes in analogue modelling at the outcrop scale (about 10 m).	Massaro et al., 2022; Massaro et al., 2023; Massaro et al., 2025

== Materials used to simulate deformation of the lower crust and mantle ==
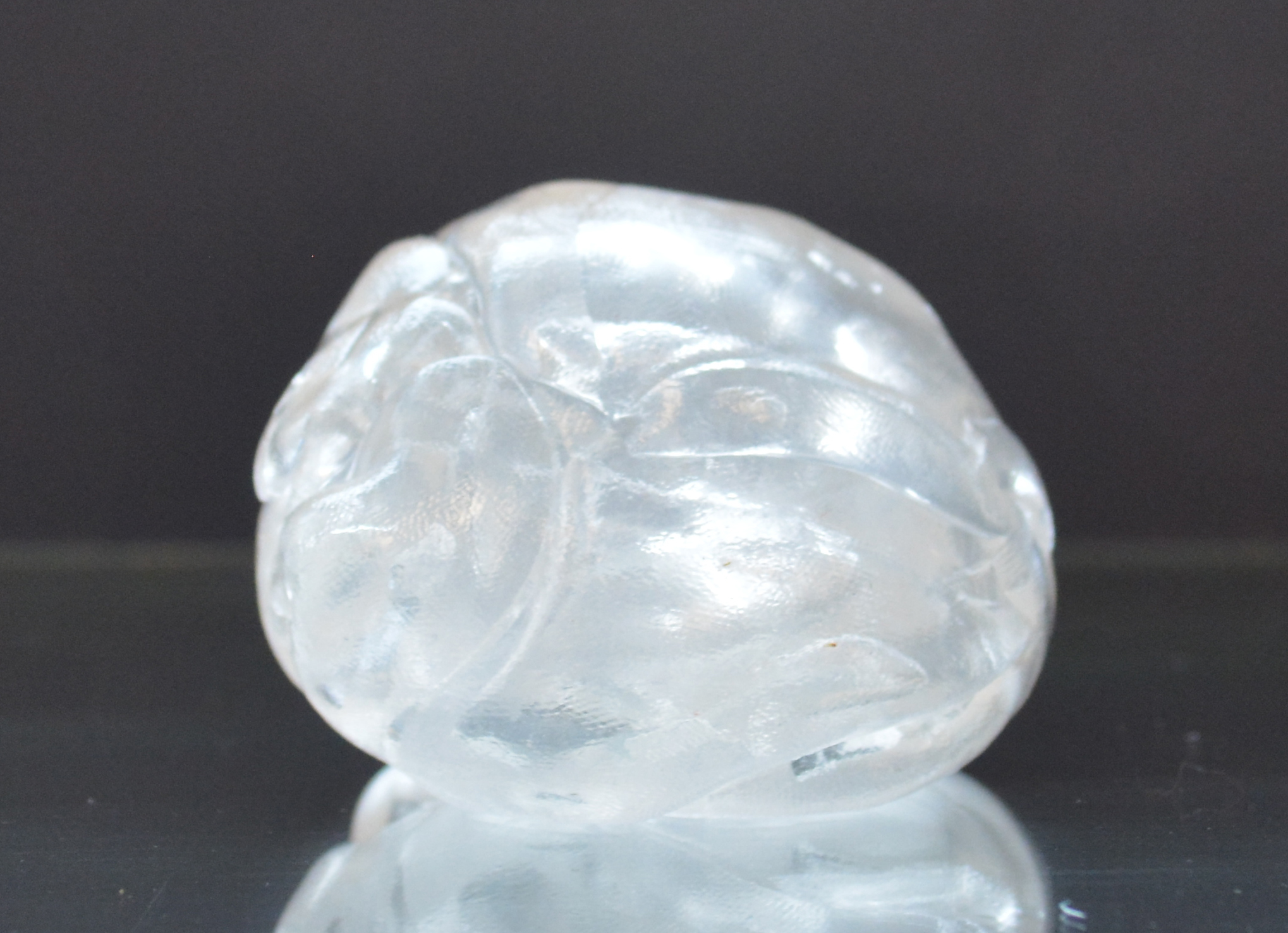
This is a sample of silicone that is used in analog modelling experiments.

Various fluids are used to simulate deformation of the lower crust and mantle, such as: linear, non-linear, and yield stress fluids.

Fluid type	Material	Application	Studies
Linear viscous fluids	Silicone Oils/Polymers	Silicone oils/polymers can have varying viscosities, which can be changed by adding fillers (dry granular materials) or colic acid. In combination with brittle model materials, silicone oils/polymers can investigate many processes in salt tectonics, including the deformation of sediments adjacent and above a salt body.	Boutelier, Schrank, & Cruden, 2008; ten Grotenhuis et al., 2002; Weijermars, 1986; Brun & Fort, 2004; Brun & Mauduit, 2009; Cobbold, Szatmari, Demercian, Coelho, & Rossello, 1995; Dooley & Hudec, 2017; Dooley et al., 2009; Dooley, Jackson & Hudec, 2013; Dooley, Jackson & Hudec, 2015; Duffy et al., 2018; Letouzey, Colletta, Vially & Chermette, 1995; Smit, Brun, Fort, Cloetingh, & Ben-Avraham, 2008; Vendeville & Jackson, 1992; Weijermars, 1986; Weijermars, Jackson, & Vendeville, 1993
Linear viscous fluids	Honey*	Honey, glucose syrup, and molasses exhibit strain independent deformation. The viscosity depends on the sugar content and temperature of the material. This makes them suitable to simulate the lower crust and mantle. *Honey can also be used as a non-linear viscous fluid under certain conditions.	Schellart, 2011
Linear viscous fluids	Glucose Syrup	Honey, glucose syrup, and molasses exhibit strain independent deformation. The viscosity depends on the sugar content and temperature of the material. This makes them suitable to simulate the lower crust and mantle. *Honey can also be used as a non-linear viscous fluid under certain conditions.	Schellart, 2011
Linear viscous fluids	Molasses	Honey, glucose syrup, and molasses exhibit strain independent deformation. The viscosity depends on the sugar content and temperature of the material. This makes them suitable to simulate the lower crust and mantle. *Honey can also be used as a non-linear viscous fluid under certain conditions.	Schellart, 2011
Linear viscous fluids	Gum Rosin	Gum rosin was used to study thermomechanical processes in the lithospheric mantle.	Cobbold & Jackson, 1992
Linear viscous fluids	Water	Water has been used to model any low viscosity material.	Paola et al., 2006
Non-linear viscous fluids	Silicone Oils/Polymers	Silicone is also used as a non-linear viscous material by adding high amounts of filler. The most common filler material used is plasticine.	Boutelier et al., 2008; Rudolf, Boutelier, Rosenau, Schreurs, & Oncken, 2016
Bingham fluid	Paraffin Wax	Paraffin wax can be used in analog experiments as a linear or non-linear yield stress fluid. By mixing paraffin wax with petrolatum, the yield stress, shear thinning, and shear softening behavior can be modified.	Duarte et al., 2014; Rossetti et al., 1999
Bingham fluid	Petrolatum	Petrolatum is commonly used as: A filler with paraffin wax; A lubricant; At this time, pure petrolatum has not been used for analog material.	Cobbold, 1975; Duarte et al., 2014; Neurath and Smith, 1892
Hershel-Bulkley fluid	Carbopol	Carbopol has been used in analogue models of: Gravity driven flow; Rayleigh-Benard-like convection; Localized shear zones; Thermal intrusions; Semi-brittle processes	Balmforth & Rust, 2009; Birren & Reber, 2019; Davaille et al., 2013; Di Federico et al., 2017; Reber et al., 2015; Schrank, Boutelier, & Cruden, 2008

== Materials used to simulate deformation of the middle crust ==
=== Composite Model Materials ===
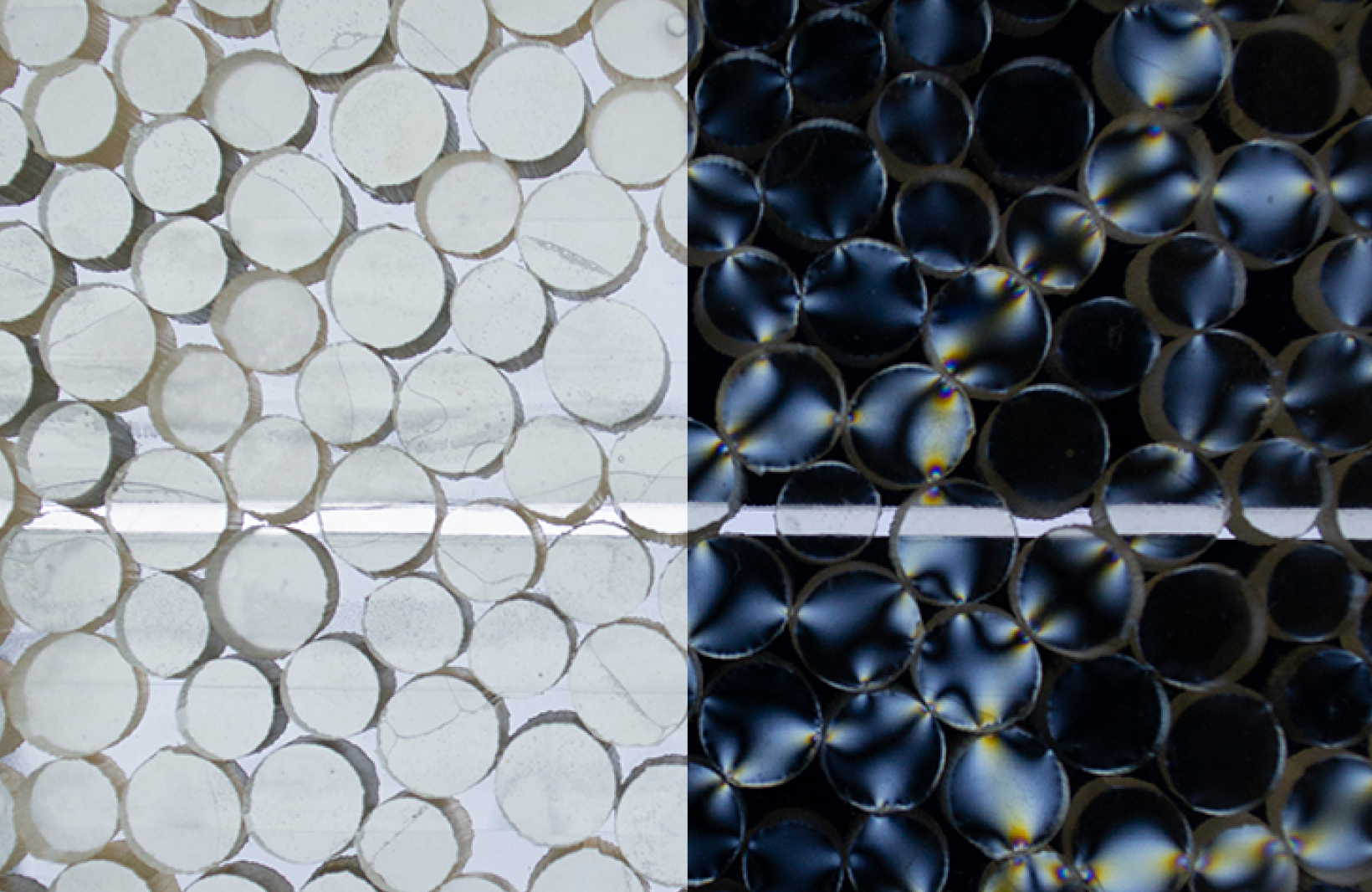
The material photographed above is polyurethane discs. The left side of image shows the discs under normal light. The right side of the image what can be observed when a polarizer is placed above the discs.

Composite materials combine phases with different physical properties. A common composite mixture contains dry granular materials and fluids. These analog materials have been used:

- Sediment transport (Parker et al., 1982) using low viscosity fluids
- Dynamics in the middle crust (Mookerjee et al., 2017; Reber et al., 2014) employing high viscosity fluids
- Stick-slip dynamics (Higashi and Sumita, 2009; Reber et al., 2014)
- Strain softening and hardening processes (Panien et al., 2006)

The most commonly used granular materials in composite mixtures are:

- Sand
- Glass beads
- Acrylic discs

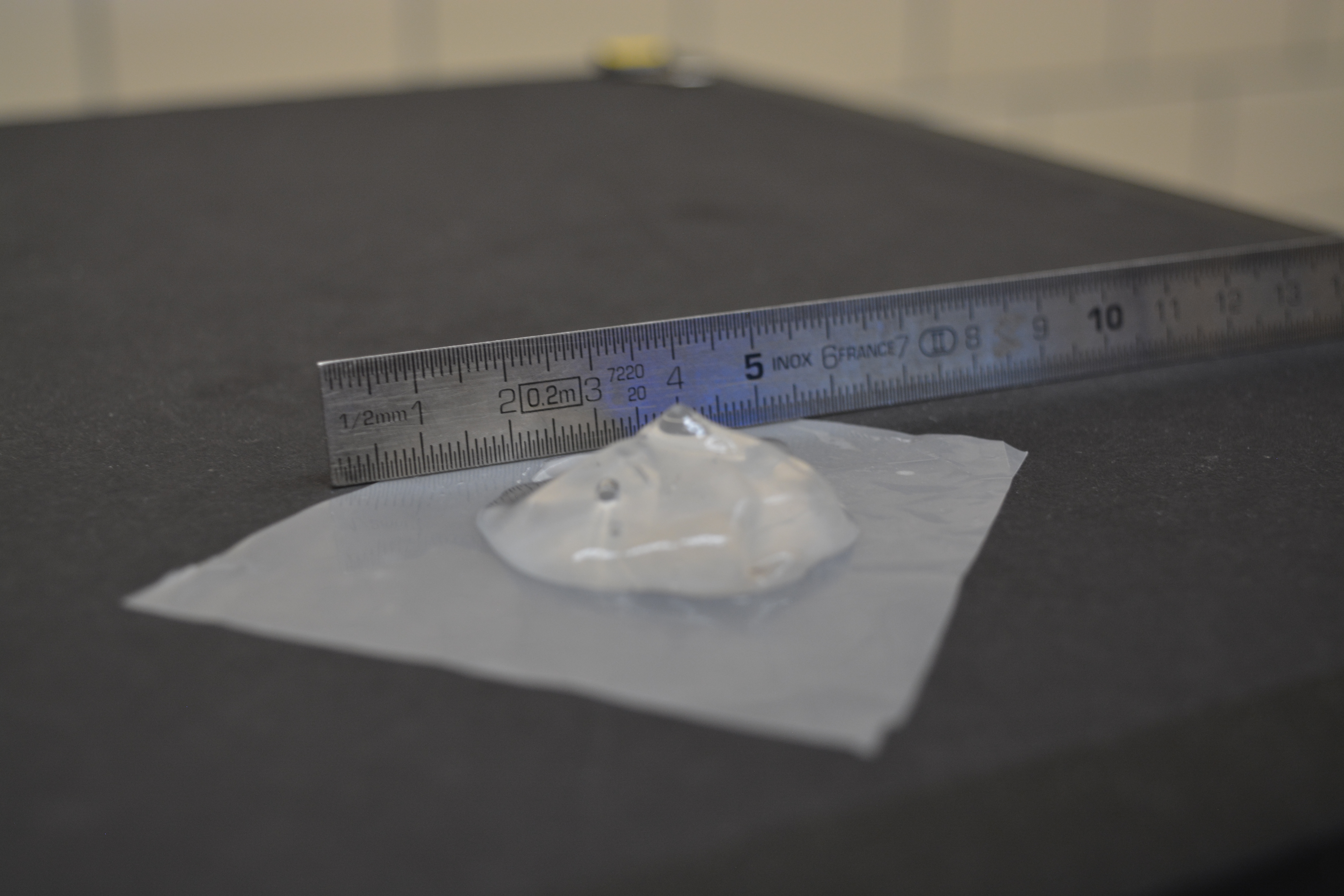
A sample of carbopol. It is a clear, gel-like substance that is commonly used in modeling experiments.

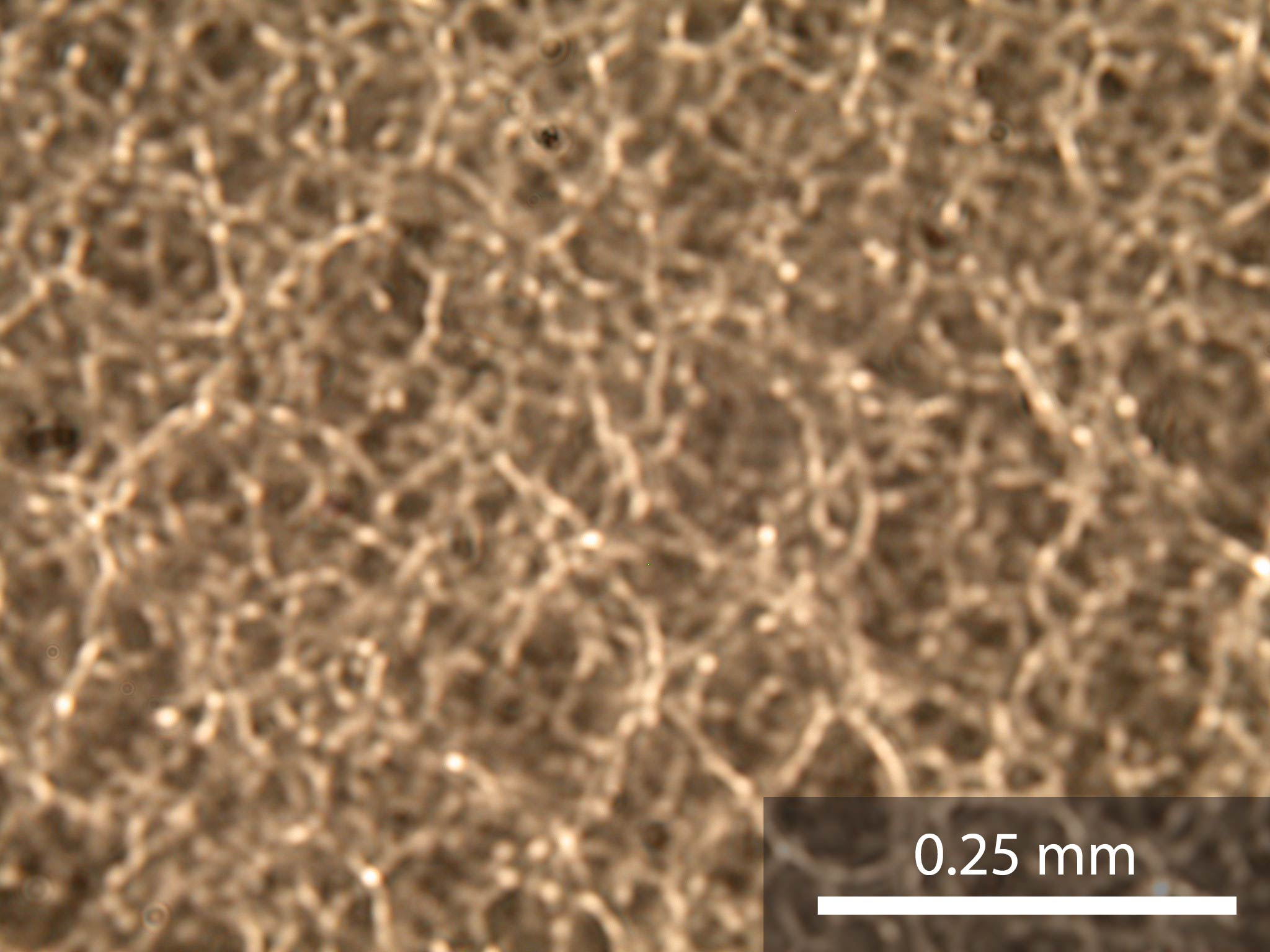
A micro-photograph of the modeling material carbopol.

Common fluids used in composite mixtures are:

- Carbopol
- Silicone
- Wax, which can behave as a brittle or viscous material depending on the melting temperature (Mookerjee et al., 2017)

=== Visco-elasto-plastic model materials ===
Visco-elasto-plastic deformation exhibits a combination of elastic, viscous, and plastic deformation at the same time. Various asphalts and bituminous materials demonstrate visco-elasto-plastic deformation but they are rarely as modeling materials (McBirney and Best, 1961).Common modeling materials demonstrating complex rheology are;

- Carbopol (Piau, 2007; Shafiei et al., 2018)
- Kaolinite clay (Cooke and van der Elst, 2012)
