= Interpolymer complexes =

Interpolymer complexes (IPC) are the products of non-covalent interactions between complementary unlike macromolecules in solutions. There are four types of these complexes:

- Interpolyelectrolyte complexes (IPEC) or polyelectrolyte complexes (PEC)
- Hydrogen-bonded interpolymer complexes
- Stereocomplexes
- Charge-transfer complexes

== Formation of interpolymer complexes ==
Interpolymer complexes can be prepared either by mixing complementary polymers in solutions or by matrix (template) polymerisation. It is also possible to prepare IPCs at liquid-liquid interfaces or at solid or soft surfaces. Usually the structure of IPCs formed will depend on many factors, including the nature of interacting polymers, concentrations of their solutions, nature of solvent and presence of inorganic ions or organic molecules in solutions. Mixing of dilute polymer solutions usually leads to formation of IPCs as a colloidal dispersion, whereas more concentrated polymer solutions form IPCs in the form of a gel.

== Methods to study interpolymer complexes ==
Methods to study interpolymer complexes could be classified into:

(1) approaches to demonstrate the fact of the complex formation and to determine the composition of IPCs in solutions;
(2) approaches to study the structure of IPCs formed;
(3) methods to characterize IPCs in solid state.

== Applications of interpolymer complexes ==
IPCs are finding applications in pharmaceutics in the design of novel dosage forms. They also are increasingly used to form various coatings using layer-by-layer deposition approach. Some IPCs were proposed for application as membranes and films. They also have been used for structuring of soils to protect from erosion. Other applications include encapsulation technologies.
