= Density contrast =

Density contrast is a parameter used in galaxy formation to indicate where there are local enhancements in matter density.

$$\Delta=\frac{\partial\varrho}{\varrho}$$

It is believed that after inflation, although the universe was mostly uniform, some regions were slightly denser than others with contrast densities on the order of 1 trillionth. As the horizon distance expanded, the enclosed causally connected (i.e. gravitationally connected) masses increased until they reached the Jeans mass and began to collapse, which allowed galaxies, galaxy clusters, superclusters, and filaments to form.
