= List of geological phenomena =

A geological phenomenon is a phenomenon which is explained by or sheds light on the science of geology.

Examples of geological phenomena are:

- Mineralogic phenomena
- Lithologic phenomena
  - Rock types
    - Igneous rock
      - Igneous formation processes
    - Sedimentary rock
      - Sedimentary formation processes (sedimentation)
      - Quicksand
    - Metamorphic rock
- Endogenic phenomena
  - Plate tectonics
    - Continental drift
    - Earthquake
    - Oceanic trench
  - Phenomena associated with igneous activity
    - Geysers and hot springs
    - Bradyseism
    - Volcanism
  - Earth's magnetic field
- Exogenic phenomena
  - Slope phenomena
    - Slump
    - Landslide
  - Weathering phenomena
    - Erosion
  - Glacial and peri-glacial phenomena
    - Glaciation
    - Moraines
    - Hanging valleys
  - Atmospheric phenomena
  - Impact phenomena
    - Impact crater
- Coupled endogenic-exogenic phenomena
  - Orogeny
  - Drainage development
    - Stream capture
