= Anker Site =

Archaeological site in Illinois, United States

- Location in Illinois Location in United States
- 41°44′01″N 87°40′00″W
- Location: on the Little Calumet River near Chicago, Illinois

Site notes
- Area: 4.5 acres (1.8 ha)

The Anker Site (11Ck-21) is located on the Little Calumet River near Chicago, Illinois. It is classified as a late prehistoric site with Upper Mississippian Huber (a.k.a. Blue Island) affiliation.

== History of archaeological investigations ==
In 1958 prehistoric remains were uncovered during construction of a subdivision in suburban Chicago. A salvage operation was undertaken under the auspices of the Illinois Archaeological Survey, along with several individuals who excavated some of the burials and features on their own and shared their findings with the Survey.

== Results of data analysis ==
Excavations at the site yielded prehistoric artifacts, a house structure, pit features, burials and animal bone. The site consisted of two parts: the village area and a cemetery containing burials with rich grave goods.

=== Features ===
Site Map

House 1

A structure was defined by the presence of post molds and other features. It was 55 feet long by 13 feet wide and oval in shape. There were 3 fireplaces along the center line and 7 refuse/cache pits inside and 2 outside the structure. Charcoal in some of the post molds implies that the structure was burned.

Eight structures located at the nearby Oak Forest site ranged from 25 to 47.5 feet long. The Anker structure is significantly larger. Ceremonial structures were known to be longer than residential structures in Native American society, and therefore the Anker structure may have been ceremonial-related or religious in nature. A dog skull was placed in one of the fire pits of this structure, which also indicates it may be ceremonial in nature.

In the village area, 4 fire pits and 17 trash pits were noted. One of the trash pits included 3 reconstructable Middle Mississippian pottery vessels, which are extremely rare in the Great Lakes area.

=== Burials ===
Two types of burials were noted: 9 bundle burials with few grave goods, and 31 extended burials, many of which contained a rich assortment of grave goods. Many of the grave goods are described below and include pipes, pottery vessels and animal bones/skulls that may have been components of medicine bundles.

=== Animal Remains ===
Remains from several species were recovered from the site. The main species present were deer, fish (especially bowfin and catfish) and turtle (especially painted turtle); also present were beaver, raccoon, dog, unidentifiable bird bone fragments and fresh water mussels (especially Amblema costata). These remains were not modified into tools like the bone tools described in the Artifacts section below, and may be considered food remains or, in the case of the dog, the remains of ceremonial activities. Dog sacrifice and dog meat consumption was observed to have ceremonial and religious implications in early Native American tribes.

=== Artifacts ===
Artifacts recovered from the site included:

- Pottery - total of 823 sherds and 10 whole or reconstructible vessels. The pottery artifacts will be discussed in more detail below.
- Stone artifacts - including 84 projectile points, 155 scrapers (subdivided into 4 types based on manufacturing technique), 5 drills and 59 random-flake knives. Of the projectile points, the most numerous category was the small triangular Madison point.
- Ground stone artifacts - including 1 rubbing stone, 2 arrow shaft straighteners, 2 manos, 10 hammerstones, 3 celts and 1 gouge.
- Bone and antler artifacts - including 4 scapula hoes, 1 scapula scraper, 4 bone needles, 2 bone awls, 7 socketed antler projectile points, 2 antler flakers, 2 antler knives and numerous other artifacts, almost all of them grave goods. Many of these are described further below.
- Shell artifacts - including 13 shell beads, 5 shell spoons, 4 mussel shell pendants, 1 shell hoe, a unique shell mask gorget with “weeping eye” motif, and numerous other artifacts, almost all of them grave goods. Some of the shell artifacts were made with marine shell. Many of these are described further below.
- Pipes - including 4 elbow pipes, 4 disc pipes, 1 pipe with block-shaped bowl, 1 pipe with tapering base, 1 vase shaped pipe, 1 truncated cone pipe, 1 bear effigy pipe, 1 human head effigy pipe and one celt-shaped pipe with incised decoration of a bison with arrow inside. Almost all of these artifacts are grave goods. Many of them are described further below.
- Copper - including 2 copper ear plugs, 4 tubular copper beads, 1 disc-shaped copper bead, 1 sheet copper bangles, 5 copper serpents, 3 copper rings, 2 copper bracelet and a copper wire coil that may have been an ear plug or earring. Almost all of these artifacts are grave goods. Many of them are described further below. The copper was all made from metals originating in the Upper Peninsula of Michigan and may have been obtained through trade. Either the artifacts could have been manufactured in Michigan and traded; or the metal was traded and the artifacts manufactured in Illinois.

The non-pottery artifacts found at an archaeological site can provide useful cultural context as well as a glimpse into the domestic tasks performed at a site; ceremonial or religious activities; recreational activities; and clothing or personal adornment.

At Anker, the vast majority of these items were grave goods recovered from the numerous burials present at the site.

Some of the most prominent and diagnostic non-pottery artifacts are presented here in more detail:

Material	Description	Image	Qty	Function / use	Comments / associations
Chipped stone	Small triangular points (a.k.a. Madison points)	Projectile points	84 total projectile points; most were small triangular points	Hunting/fishing/warfare	Also known as “arrowheads”; are thought to be arrow-tips for bows-and-arrows. The usage of the bow-and-arrow seems to have greatly increased after A.D. 1000, probably as a result of increased conflict. At Anker, 41 were located in a single burial with an arrow shaft straightener.
Chipped stone	Large leaf-shaped blade	Drills	1	Domestic function / cutting applications	Typical of Upper Mississippian sites, particularly Huber and Oneota (Orr focus); present at Moccasin Bluff in Michigan where they are referred to as "ovate bifaces"
Chipped stone	Rough triangular humpback blades	Thick, steep-end blades-scrapers	13 complete, 8 fragments	Domestic function / woodworking	Reported from other Huber sites but not from Oneota; present at Moccasin Bluff in Michigan where they are referred to as "thick steep-edge" scrapers
Chipped stone	Drills	Drills	4 double-pointed (pictured); 1 tapered to point	Domestic function / processing wood or hides	The double pointed type is common in Upper Mississippian contexts
Stone	Sandstone abrader a.k.a. arrow shaft straightener	Arrow shaft straightener	2	Domestic function / straightening arrow shafts for bows-and-arrows	Typical at Upper Mississippian sites; one of the Anker specimens was found with a burial
Antler	Antler projectile points; socketed	Antler projectile points	7	Hunting/fishing/warfare	Common at Upper Mississippian sites, especially Fisher; 3 of the Anker specimens were found in burials
Stone	Gouge	Gouge	1	Domestic function / woodworking	This artifact is not usually found in Upper Mississippian contexts; it commonly occurs in earlier archaeological periods; the one at Anker was associated with a burial
Bone	Beamer	Beamer	1	Domestic function / hide-working tool	Commonly found at Fisher and Langford sites; the specimen at Anker was associated with a burial
Bone	Scapula hoes	Scapula hoe	4 (2 with elk scapula, 2 with indeterminate large mammal scapula)	Domestic function / Agricultural-horticultural or general digging tool	Common at Fisher and Oneota sites; they may have been used to dig out the pit features or graves present at Anker.
Bone	Scapula knife or scraper		1	Domestic function / cutting applications	This artifact has been found at the Fisher/Huber Griesmer site in Northwestern Indiana, just to the east of Chicago; and other sites in the Midwest, especially Illinois, and is variously defined as a "knife", "scraper", "spade" or "celt"; the specimen at Anker was associated with a burial
Antler	Knives	Antler knives	2	Domestic function / cutting applications	Associated with a burial
Bone	Bone cylinders or dice / game pieces	Bone game pieces	8	Entertainment function	These have been found at Fisher, Huber, Langford and Oneota (especially Grand River focus and Lake Winnebago focus) and may have been used in a gambling game. Gambling was noted to be a popular pastime among the early Native American tribes. The specimens from Anker were associated with a burial.
Stone	Elbow pipe fragment	Elbow pipe	4	Ceremonial-Recreational function / pipe smoking	Common at sites in Illinois; the Anker specimens were associated with burials
Stone	Disc pipe fragment	Disc pipe	4	Ceremonial-Recreational function / pipe smoking	Common at sites in Illinois; the Anker specimens were associated with burials
Stone	Rectangular block-shaped pipe fragment	Rectangular block pipe	1	Ceremonial-Recreational function / pipe smoking	Common at sites in Illinois; the Anker specimens were associated with burials
Stone	Bear effigy pipe fragment	Bear effigy pipe	1	Ceremonial-Recreational function / pipe smoking	Associated with a burial. Effigy pipes are not common among Upper Mississippian cultures; this item may have been obtained through trade. They are common at Whittlesey sites in northern Ohio, and have been reported from the Late Woodland Dumaw Creek site (also associated with a burial) in Michigan.
Stone	Human head effigy pipe	Human head effigy pipe	1	Ceremonial-Recreational function / pipe smoking	This unique artifact was associated with a burial and is typical of Iroquoian pipe designs from Ontario and New York State
Stone	Celt shaped pipe with incised decoration depicting bison and arrow	Celt shaped decorated pipe	1	Ceremonial-Recreational function / pipe smoking	Incised decoration is on both sides; very unusual for sites in this area. Associated with a burial.
Bone	Pipe stem made of human bone	Human bone pipe stem	1	Ceremonial-Recreational function / pipe smoking	Associated with a burial
Bone	Rasp (musical instrument) made of human bone	Human bone rasp	1	Ceremonial-Recreational function / entertainment or use at ceremony	Associated with a burial; bone rasps have been found at Huber, Whittlesey and Fort Ancient sites, usually from animal, not human, bone
Antler	Bird figurine with socketed pedestal	Bird figurine	1	Art work / Decorative and/or Ceremonial application	Associated with a burial. Copper spangles were found neard the artifact that may have originally been suspended from the tail. May have been decorative or might have had spiritual or magical significance. The historic Menominee were observed to use a carved wooden bird during ceremonies to kill people with sorcery.
Bone	Wolf mandible pendant	Wolf mandibles	2 sections	Personal Adornment and/or Ceremonial application	Associated with a burial; may have been part of a medicine bundle
Bone	Snake vertebrae necklace	Snake vertebrae necklace	1	Personal Adornment and/or Ceremonial application	Associated with a burial; there was a copper hair pipe and 2 mussel shells next to it that were probably originally part of the same necklace
Copper	Serpent effigy	Copper serpent	5	Personal Adornment and/or Ceremonial application	Similar copper serpent figurines have been found at other sites in the American Midwest region: several Oneota Orr focus sites in Iowa; the Fifield Site in northeastern Indiana just east of Chicago; the Summer Island site in Michigan; and the Madisonville site in Ohio. The Orr focus sites, Madisonville and Summer Island all have early European trade goods associated, indicating these figurines were still being made at the time of European contact. The Anker specimen was associated with a burial.
Shell	Mask gorget with "weeping eye" motif	Shell gorget	1	Art Piece / Religious application	This sherd pendant with the “weeping eye” motif is also indicative of a late prehistoric to early Historic time placement. The weeping eye motif on shell mask gorgets has been observed at several Middle Mississippian sites, and the Dumaw Creek site in Oceana County, Michigan. A sherd pendant with this motif was recovered at the Fifield site in Northwestern Indiana, just east of Chicago.

=== Upper Mississippian Huber (a.k.a. Blue Island) Pottery ===
Complete or reconstructed vessels

Trade vessels

Huber Ware sherds

Archaeologists often find pottery to be a useful tool in analyzing a prehistoric culture as it can be plentiful at a site and the details of manufacture and decoration are sensitive indicators of time, space and culture.

Most of the pottery conforms to the Huber Ware classification which is characteristic of the Chicago area in the late prehistoric to Protohistoric/early Historic periods (approx. A.D. 1400-1680s). Although the Huber tradition was well known by archaeologists for decades following the original excavations at the Huber site, a formalized typology was not developed until Charles Faulkner devised one in his 1972 report on the Griesmer site in northwestern Indiana, just to the east of Chicago.

Huber pottery is characterized by shell-tempered, plain surface pottery with globular vessel shape and restricted orifices with everted rims. Some vessels also have strap handles. Decoration (when present) usually consists of vertical or obliquely applied incised lines generally running from just below the lip to the shoulder. Rarely, surfaces are cordmarked or smoothed over cordmarked. The top of the lip is either plain or decorated with fine to wide notching. A minority also have punctate decoration, mostly in combination with the trailed lines.

The 1958 excavations recovered 823 sherds, almost all of it Huber ware. Surfaces were primarily plain and decorated with medium- to wide-trailed lines on the shoulder area. Most of the lips were notched. Rarely, punctates accompanied the incised lines.

However, some of the whole or reconstructible pots recovered were obviously trade ware from outside the Chicago area. These vessels were characteristic of types found on the Mississippi River near the Arkansas area:

- One was decorated with nodes over the entire body of the vessel
- One had a narrow, straight neck and globular body; it was decorated with a black painted design and wavy black band was painted over a red slipped surface
- One was a red slipped vessel with a frog effigy at the mouth
- One was a slightly squat, globular vessel decorated by a white band on one side and a white oval surrounded by red band on the other side, with a human head effigy at the mouth

Following Faulkner's typology, this is the proportion of the pottery types at the site:

- Huber Plain - 75%, characterized by a plain surface
- Huber Trailed - 4%, characterized by a plain surface decorated with fine incised lines
- Huber Bold - 6%, characterized by a plain surface decorated with wide lines, possibly finger-trailed
- Huber Cordmarked - 12%, characterized by a cordmarked surface
- Fisher - 1.5%
- Other types - 1.2%

=== Chronology of Anker pottery within the Huber (a.k.a. Blue Island) sequence ===
The trends in certain pottery traits are very time-sensitive and can be used as indicators of relative age. Based on information on other Huber sites in the area, archaeologists have determined early Huber pottery is more likely to have cordmarked surface finish; wide-trailed decoration; and notched lips. Early Huber sites have also been observed to have significant amounts of Fisher Ware as well. Late Huber pottery has predominately smooth surface finish; fine-line incised decoration; and unnotched lips.

In the Anker site assemblage, 12% of sherds are cordmarked (more than any other Huber site except Hoxie Farm), and 59% of decorated sherds have wide-line decoration. Also, 74% of the lips are notched, and there is a small presence of Fisher Ware in the assemblage. This combination of traits indicates a relatively early time placement for Anker within the Huber sequence. The researchers who excavated the site estimated the range of occupation to be approximately A.D. 1400–1500.

== Huber (a.k.a. Blue Island) within the Upper Mississippian culture ==
Huber ware (and Huber culture) are often mentioned together with Fisher. Both Fisher and Huber are Upper Mississippian cultures which existed in the southern Lake Michigan region in the states of northern Illinois and Indiana and southwest Michigan. Both have shell-tempered pottery but Huber is predominantly plain surface with fine-line decoration and Fisher is predominantly cordmarked surface with wide-line decoration.

The relationship of Huber and Fisher both with each other and with other Upper Mississippian cultures in the area has long been a matter of debate and speculation among archaeologists. James Griffin, upon examining the artifacts from the original 1929 excavations at the Huber site, felt that Huber was a Component of the Oneota Aspect based on the form and design of the pottery, close to the Orr and Lake Winnebago foci, and that Fisher was part of a separate focus. Since that date, we’ve obtained a great deal more information and now we know that Fisher is the older of the two and Huber is the one that survived to the Historic period, based on the association of Huber pottery with early Historic European trade goods at several sites.

Nevertheless, both Fisher and Huber coexist at the same sites seemingly at the same time. Hoxie Farm, Griesmer and Moccasin Bluff are examples of this.

Most archaeologists now believe that both Fisher and Huber are taxonomically-related phases within the Oneota tradition. The relationship between the two is time-related in that Huber is derived from Fisher; but there are also late Fisher sites like Fifield, where Fisher pottery is associated with late prehistoric artifacts, so it is possible that Fisher also survived until the Protohistoric or early Historic period.

The Anker site is unique among Huber sites in the amount of trade goods and ceremonial/religious items present. The site may have been a ceremonial or trade center; or there may have been a migration of peoples coming from the lower portion of the Mississippi River to interact with the Huber Culture population and perhaps settle in the area.

== Significance ==
The Anker site is a site belonging to the Huber tradition (a.k.a. Blue Island) and is considered to be closely related to the Oneota Orr focus. The site is unique among Huber sites in the large amount of trade goods, mostly from the lower Mississippi River area but also from northern Michigan and the Iroquoian area of Ontario and New York State. This could mean either extensive trade networks or movements of people.

The structure present at Anker is larger than other Huber period houses noted at the Oak Forest site and therefore may be a ceremonial structure. The fact that a dog skull was placed in one of the pits supports that possibility. Also, many of the grave goods may be interpreted as parts of medicine bundles or otherwise have spiritual or religious implications. The presence of the gorget with "weeping eye" motif and the trade vessels from the Middle Mississippian area suggest that the Anker residents participated in or at least had knowledge of the Southeastern Ceremonial Complex.

Based on the animal bone found at the site, and the presence of scapula hoes, it is thought that the site was occupied at least during the summer months. It may have functioned as a religious/ceremonial center in the settlement pattern of the Huber culture, while other sites such as Oak Forest served as semi-permanent residential areas.

There are no radiocarbon dates available for the site, but based on the artifacts present, the researchers believe the site was occupied from approximately A.D. 1400 to 1500. The specific Native American tribe represented by the remains is unknown; however, Miami, Illinois or a Chewere Sioux group are possibilities.
