= Hotel Plaza site =

Archaeological site in Illinois, United States

- Location in Illinois Location in United States
- 41°19′17″N 88°59′25″W
- Location: on the Illinois River in Starved Rock State Park, Illinois

The Hotel Plaza site (Ls-36) is located near Starved Rock, on the Illinois River across from the Zimmerman site (a.k.a. Grand Village of the Illinois. It is a multi-component site representing prehistoric, protohistoric and early historic periods, with the main occupation being an early Historic component associated with the French Fort St. Louis.

Early French explorers Joliet, Marquette, Allouez and Tonti were present at the Grand Village of Kaskaskia between 1673 and 1680. The Kaskaskia were a subdivision of the Illiniwek Confederacy. Other Illiniwek groups also had a presence at the site, most notably the Peoria, Tapouaro and Coiracoentanon. Later, other tribes such as the Miami and Shawnee were present at the site. In the fall of 1680 the village was burned down by an Iroquois war party and abandoned.

After the Grand Village was abandoned, in 1682 the French started building Fort St. Louis to reassure their Native American allies of their commitment. Shortly thereafter the Illinois and other tribes begin to gather nearby in hopes of obtaining protection.

The Hotel Plaza site is located near the site of an early 20th Century hotel on Starved Rock, within a few hundred yards of the former Fort St. Louis location.

== History of archaeological investigations ==
In 1948 and 1949 the site was excavated under the auspices of the Illinois State Museum and the University of Chicago. Three grids were established: Grid A in 1948, and Grids B & C in 1949.

== Results of data analysis ==
Excavations at the site yielded prehistoric and historic artifacts, pit features, burials, animal bone and plant remains.

=== Components ===
Several prehistoric and historic components were identified at the site:

- Prehistoric Late Archaic component – c. B.C. 2500 – B.C. 1500; this was a pre-pottery period characterized by distinctive projectile points and other stone artifacts
- Prehistoric Early Woodland component – c. B.C. 1500 – B.C. 200; characterized by the earliest pottery made in the Great Lakes area; Marion Thick and other Early Woodland types
- Prehistoric Middle Woodland component – c. B.C. 200 – A.D. 500; characterized by Havana Ware and other types
- Prehistoric Upper Mississippian Langford component – c. A.D. 1500 – A.D. 1600s
- Prehistoric to Early historic Late Woodland Swanson complex – c. A.D. 800 – A.D. 1600s; characterized by grit-tempered Swanson Ware (a.k.a. “Tonti” Late Woodland) pottery
- Early Historic Fort Ancient LaSalle component – c. A.D. 1673 – A.D. 1690s; characterized by shell-tempered LaSalle filleted and Madisonville Focus pottery

=== Features ===
25 features were excavated at Hotel Plaza, categorized as follows:

- 10 storage pits
- 2 refuse pits
- 1 fire pit
- 1 roasting pit like the "macoupin roasting pits" found at the Zimmerman site
- 6 late historic features probably related to the early 20th century hotel located on the site
- 2 were rodent disturbances
- 3 uncategorized

The roasting pit appears to correspond to what has ethnographically been described as "macoupin roasting pits" by the early French explorers Deliette and LaSalle and described from the Zimmerman site. The macoupins are apparently tubers from a species of water lily, perhaps the American Lotus (Nelumbo lutea). Tubers of Nelumbo lutea have been recovered from similar roasting pits at the Elam and Schwerdt sites on the Kalamazoo River in western Michigan; and tubers of the white water lily (Nymphaea tuberosa) have been recovered from roasting pits at the Griesmer site in northwestern Indiana. This particular cooking technique may have been used prehistorically for several species of similar water lilies, or other similar root plants. No tubers were specifically recovered from the Hotel Plaza site, however. This may be due to the fact that there was no systematic effort by the excavators to collect plant remains.

=== Burials ===
Six burials were recorded during the excavations, but by the time the site report was being prepared the remains had been lost or discarded. According to the excavator's notes, 2 burials had grave goods and 2 additional burials had artifacts associated but were in such badly disturbed contexts that it was unclear if these items were grave goods or not.

=== Animal remains ===
Remains from several species were recovered from the site. The main species present were deer, beaver, dog, turtle, and fresh water mussels. These remains were not modified into tools like the bone tools described in the Artifacts section below, and may be considered food remains or, in the case of the dog, the remains of ceremonial activities. Dog sacrifice and dog meat consumption was observed to have ceremonial and religious implications in early Native American tribes.

=== Plant remains ===
Plant remains were not systematically collected via the flotation technique as that did not become standard archaeological practice until the 1970s. The excavators did however recover 8-rowed maize in the form of several kernels and one corncob. Also present were 1 fragment of common bean, a peach pit and one more unidentifiable fruit pit.

=== Artifacts ===
==== Pottery artifacts ====
Swanson Series pottery

Madisonville grooved paddle vessel

LaSalle filleted pottery

Archaeologists often find pottery to be a very useful tool in analyzing a prehistoric culture. It is usually very plentiful at a site and the details of manufacture and decoration are very sensitive indicators of time, space and culture.

Based on analysis of the pottery collected in the 1948 and 1949 excavations, 4 distinct components were identified. They are presented below along with their associated pottery types:

===== Early occupations =====
The Early and Middle Woodland periods are represented by a small scattering of pottery at Hotel Plaza. The Early Woodland is represented by Marion Thick, the first pottery ever made in this part of North America, and traces of a few other early types. The Middle Woodland is represented by Havana Ware and Weaver Ware, among others. The Havana Culture was thought to be a local variant of the main Middle Woodland, which was dominated by the Adena and Hopewell cultures of the Mississippi and Ohio River Valleys. Middle Woodland cultures are characterized by their large burial mounds, some of which are still visible today; as well as their distinctive pottery forms, ceremonial practices, agricultural activities, and widespread trade networks.

===== Upper Mississippian Langford ware =====
Langford trailed – represented by 3 rim and 7 body sherds; grit-tempered, globular vessels, rim profile vertical to outflaring, decorated from neck to shoulder with fine to wide incised lines or curvilinear patterns made using a stick or antler time. Decorations take the form of meandering parallel lines, nested arches and reed punctates. Lip sometimes notched or scalloped,. First reported from the Fisher site, Period B. Also found at the Zimmerman (Heally complex), Starved Rock, Plum Island and Gentleman Farm sites. Related to Grand River trailed in the Oneota Tradition. Time period: prehistoric. Cultural affiliation: Upper Mississippian.

===== Swanson series (a.k.a. "Tonti" Late Woodland) =====
This Swanson series pottery is a Late Woodland ware first identified at the nearby Zimmerman site in Illinois. The probable timeframe of Swanson is approximately A.D. 800 to the time of European contact or about A.D. 1670. The Swanson people cultivated maize but a large part of their diet was supplied by hunting a wide variety of game, and gathering nuts (particularly hazelnut) and berries.

The following Swanson pottery types are reported from Hotel Plaza:

- Swanson smooth – represented by 1 rim sherd; grit-tempered vessels with smoothed surfaces and vertical to slightly incurved rim profile and rounded and notched lips. Has relationships with pottery from Moccasin Bluff, Starved Rock and Zimmerman, the last two of which are Protohistoric to early historic. First defined at the Zimmerman site. Time period: Prehistoric to Protohistoric or early Historic. Cultural affiliation: Late Woodland.
- Swanson cord-marked – represented by 13 rim sherds and 698 body sherds; grit-tempered, globular vessels with slightly elongated, semi-conoidal bases, cordmarked surface, vertical to slightly incurved rim profile, rounded and notched lips, and fingernail impressions at the base of neck. Similar pottery has been found at the Starved Rock and Zimmerman sites in Protohistoric and early Historic contexts; and at Fisher and Moccasin Bluff in Prehistoric contexts. First defined at the Zimmerman site. Time period: Prehistoric to Protohistoric or early Historic. Cultural affiliation: Late Woodland.
- Swanson smoothed-over-cord-marked – represented by 10 rim sherds and 97 body sherds; same as Swanson cord-marked except the cordmarked surfaces are partially smoothed over. This type was defined at Hotel Plaza. Time period: Prehistoric to Protohistoric or early Historic. Cultural affiliation: Late Woodland.

===== LaSalle component =====
The early historic Period LaSalle component is related to the Danner complex at the Zimmerman site. Both are considered Fort Ancient Madisonville Focus based on the pottery types present. This pottery complex has been thought to represent Shawnee material culture, and since the Shawnee had an historically recorded presence at Starved Rock, it has been suggested that the LaSalle component as well as the Danner complex may represent the presence of the Shawnee tribe at the Zimmerman and Hotel Plaza sites.

The following LaSalle component pottery types were reported from Hotel Plaza:

- Madisonville grooved paddle – represented by one partially reconstructable vessel, 1 rim sherd and 5 body sherds; the partially reconstructed vessel is a shell-tempered globular vessel with constricted orifice, well-defined shoulder, vertical rim profile, “hourglass” strap handles and flattened lip. Surface finish is partially smoothed-over grooved-paddle finish applied below the shoulder and smoothed finish above the shoulder; with punctate decoration where the two zones meet. First reported at the Madisonville site near Cincinnati, Ohio. Related to the type Danner grooved paddle, present at the Danner complex at the Zimmerman site. Time period: prehistoric to early historic. Prehistoric Cultural Affiliation: Fort Ancient. Historic Cultural Affiliation: Unknown, possibly Shawnee.
- LaSalle filleted – represented by 15 rim, 3 neck and 358 body sherds; shell-tempered, globular vessels with flared rims, round to flat lips, and a notched fillet on the neck portion. Vessels of this type have been recovered from the Zimmerman site and the Rock Island II site in Green Bay, northern Lake Michigan. Like the Danner Series, this pottery type is also related to the Madisonville Focus. Time period: Protohistoric to Historic. Prehistoric Cultural Affiliation: Fort Ancient. Historic Cultural Affiliation: Unknown, possibly Shawnee.

==== Other artifacts ====
Non-pottery artifacts recovered from the site included:

- Stone artifacts – including projectile points, scrapers (subdivided into variants based on manufacturing technique), knives, drills, chisels, blade knives, a shredder, microperforators, a chipped celt fragment, cores and gunflints. Of the projectile points, a wide variety were present representing a span of over 4,000 years and including Archaic; Early, Middle and Late Woodland; and Fort Ancient styles.
- Ground stone artifacts – including arrow shaft straighteners, manos, hammerstones, a celt, a grinding stone and a ground pendant.
- Bone artifacts – the only bone artifact reported was one matting needle.
- European trade goods – including beads, kaolin pipe stem fragments, tinkling cones, iron knives, a bell, an iron awl, iron core bracelets, brass fragments, finger rings and buttons.

The non-pottery artifacts found at an archaeological site can provide useful cultural context as well as a glimpse into the domestic tasks performed at a site; ceremonial or religious activities; recreational activities; and clothing or personal adornment.

Some of the most prominent and diagnostic non-pottery artifacts are presented here in more detail:

Material	Description	Image	Qty	Function / use	Comments / associations
Chipped stone	Small triangular points (a.k.a. Madison point)	Projectile points	3	Hunting/fishing/warfare	Also known as “arrowheads”; are thought to be arrow-tips for bows-and-arrows. The usage of the bow-and-arrow seems to have greatly increased after A.D. 1000, probably as a result of increased conflict. At Hotel Plaza, they were associated with both the LaSalle component and the Swanson complex.
Chipped stone	Roxana point	Roxana point	1	Hunting/fishing/warfare	This point style is characteristic of the Late Woodland; the Hotel Plaza specimen is associated with the Swanson complex
Chipped stone	Turkey tail point	Turkey tail point	1	Hunting/fishing/warfare	This point is characteristic of the Red Ochre culture which flourished during the Late Archaic/Early Woodland transition; from c. B.C. 1500 – B.C. 100 this culture was extant over a large amount of territory including most of Illinois, northwards to the Michigan Upper Peninsula and eastward to the Detroit area. It is representative of the minor early components present at Hotel Plaza.
Ground stone	Celt	Celt	1	Domestic function / woodworking	At Hotel Plaza, this artifact is thought to be associated with the Swanson complex
Ground stone	Abrader (a.k.a. arrow shaft straightener)	Abrader	9 including fragments	Domestic function / straightening arrow shafts	Typical at Oneota and Fort Ancient sites; the specimens at Hotel Plaza are thought to be associated with the LaSalle component
Glass	Pendant	Glass pendant	1	Personal adornment function / grave goods	European trade item; found in a burial associated with Swanson complex pottery sherds
Iron	Wire bracelet	Iron wire bracelet	1	Personal adornment function / grave goods	European trade item; found in a burial associated with Swanson complex pottery sherds
Bone	Matting needle	Mat needle	1	Domestic function / sewing mats or clothing	Used by prairie tribes to make reed mats. Also common in the Madisonville component of the Fort Ancient aspect. The Hotel Plaza specimen is thought to be associated with the LaSalle component.
Brass	Jesuit finger rings	Jesuit finger rings	2	Personal Adornment / Religious Function	These rings date from the Middle Historic Period (c. A.D. 1624-1700) per Quimby's classification; depicting the L-heart and Madonna symbols

== Significance ==
The Hotel Plaza site reflects a series of occupations going back thousands of years, but the main occupation consists of the Swanson complex and LaSalle component of the late prehistoric and early historic periods. The site adds some more detail to the occupation of the Starved Rock area at the time of European contact.

The LaSalle component is contemporaneous with the Danner component at the Zimmerman site and provides additional evidence of a Fort Ancient presence in the area in early Historic times. The connection with Madisonville Focus pottery suggests that the Shawnee may be the ethnic group behind Danner/LaSalle, but this is a matter of sharp debate among archaeologists.

Also the Swanson complex represents the presence of Late Woodland culture at Hotel Plaza. Some of the Swanson material is quite ancient and may date to A.D. 800 or earlier. It has been suggested that early Swanson culture may have evolved out of Middle Woodland Weaver Ware, which itself dates back to approximately B.C. 100.

On the other hand, at Hotel Plaza Swanson pottery is shown to be associated with European trade goods so there is strong evidence this culture also crossed over from the Prehistoric to early Historic period. However there has been no evidence to indicate which early Historic ethnic group (i.e. tribe) Swanson might represent.
