= Walker-Hooper Site =

Archaeological site in Wisconsin, US

Walker-Hooper Site (47-GL-65)

- Location in Wisconsin Location in United States
- 43°43′44″N 89°15′54″W
- Location: Green Lake County, Wisconsin

Site notes
- Area: 60 acres (24 ha)

The Walker-Hooper Site (47-GL-65) is a multicomponent prehistoric site complex located on the Grand River in the Upper Fox River drainage area in Green Lake County, Wisconsin. It consisted of at least 2 village sites and several mound groups (all of which are destroyed today). It was excavated by S.A. Barrett under the auspices of the Milwaukee Public Museum in 1921 and again in 1967 by Guy Gibbon of the University of Wisconsin-Milwaukee. The major component of the site is an Upper Mississippian Oneota palisaded village. Other components were also present, mainly Late Woodland but also including Archaic, Early Woodland and Middle Woodland.

== Site Environment ==
The site is located in the Carolinian Biotic Province as defined by Cleland. The environment of the immediate site surroundings included prairie, oak-hickory forest and marshland.

== Summary of 1921 excavations ==
Bear effigy mound, Mound 1 of Mound Group 4

The 1921 excavations focused on the burial mounds present on the site. There were at least 6 groups of mounds, and a total of 38 burials were recovered. Mound 1 of Mound Group 4 was interesting in that it was shaped in the form of a bear effigy.

Of the 38 burials, 23 were flexed, 8 were extended and 7 were indeterminate due to poor preservation or disturbance. The adults were almost all flexed, while the extended burials were generally infant or child burials. Grave goods were present in some burials, including pottery vessels and other artifacts. Some burials contained charcoal, implying a fire was built as part of the burial ceremony.

In addition, several “camp sites” and refuse pits were excavated, which contained animal bone, pot sherds, shell fragments and stone and bone tools and fragments.

The following artifacts were recovered from the 1921 excavations:

- Chipped stone - only a quartzite projectile point was reported, which was included in a burial
- Ground stone - including an adze, a spade and fragmentary celts and axes
- Bone and antler - including a bear tusk pendant, phalangeal bone pendant, bone awls, bone beads, a harpoon, fish hooks, antler flakers, scrapers and an antler projectile point
- Shell - including unio shell pendants and shell spoons
- Copper - including a bracelet, beads, a serpent-shaped pendant, an awl and a celt

Some of these artifacts are illustrated and discussed further below.

== Summary of 1967 excavations ==
House 1

House 2

The 1967 excavations yielded 2 rows of post molds interpreted as palisades; 2 oval-shaped houses; sheet middens; and 66 cache and refuse pits containing cultural debris such as pot sherds, lithic debitage and animal bone.

The houses measured 35 x 10 feet and 20 x 11 feet. Similar houses at the Huber Phase sites of Anker and Oak Forest in the Chicago area measured from 25–55 feet wide by 12–15 feet wide. The cache and refuse pits were located both within and outside the structures, although the ones outside structures tended to be larger.

The following artifacts were recovered from the 1967 excavations:

- Chipped stone - including 93 projectile points (including 78 triangular Madison points), 13 wedges, 6 gouges, 29 notched flakes, 9 gravers, 19 bifacial knives, 2 Kolterman indented-base knives, 5 small ovate knives, 12 end scrapers and 6 side scrapers
- Ground stone - including 16 hammerstones, 1 anvil, 1 pottery polishing pebble, 8 grinding stones, 2 ground stone pendants, 4 hoes, 4 paint stones and 5 adzes
- Bone and antler - including 6 antler projectile points, 13 deer tine flakers, 4 beaver incisor chisels, 5 bone punches, 4 deer metapodial awls, 4 deer scapula awls, 1 canine ulna awl, 1 bird bone awl, 8 flat splinter awls, 6 deer jaw sickles, 7 cannon bone beamers, 1 deer humerus gouge, 2 human tooth pendants, 1 canine tooth pendant and 3 bird bone tubes/ornaments
- Shell - including 4 fishing lures, 11 shell scrapers and 6 shell spoons
- Copper - including 4 pendants
- Pottery sherd - 12 pottery sherd discs similar in temper and paste to the Oneota pottery found on the site
- Clay - 1 clay spoon, 1 fragmentary clay smoking pipe and 1 ear spool

Some of these artifacts are illustrated and discussed further below.

== Results of data analysis ==
=== Animal remains ===
Animal remains were only reported from the 1967 excavations. The major species were deer and fish (especially freshwater drum, bass and northern pike). Some of the other species present were mussels, beaver, elk, dog, bear, otter, duck and common loon. These remains were not modified into tools like the bone tools described elsewhere in this article, and may be considered food remains or, in the case of the dog and bear, possibly the remains of ceremonial activities. Dog sacrifice and dog meat consumption was observed to have ceremonial and religious implications in early Native American tribes. Bear worship and ceremonialism has also been recorded in the ethnological record.

Many of the bones were deliberately smashed, implying they were extracting marrow or bone grease.

Significantly, the estimated pounds of meat of the fish bones recovered indicate that fish provided an equal portion of the diet compared to the mammal bone, which means the inhabitants were heavily reliant on aquatic resources.

Despite a close proximity to prairie habitat, there were no bison remains recovered from the site. It has been suggested that bison did not range east of the Mississippi River until after A.D. 1600.

=== Plant remains ===
Plant remains were only reported from the 1967 excavations. Maize cobs and kernels, and hickory nut shell, were the most abundant. Present in trace amounts were beans, squash, acorn and hazelnut.

The hickory nut shell was smashed into small pieces which implies that the inhabitants were smashing the nuts, boiling in water and skimming the oil off the top.

=== Artifacts ===
==== Pottery artifacts ====
Grand River plain vessels

Archaeologists often find pottery to be a useful tool in analyzing a prehistoric culture. Usually plentiful at dig sites, the details of manufacture and decoration can be sensitive indicators of time, space and culture.

The 1921 excavations yielded several complete vessels associated with burials. However, these were not analyzed or assigned to a formal typology. During the 1967 excavations, no whole or reconstructable vessels were recovered from the site, so the analysis was based upon examination of rim and body sherds. Due to the large number of very small sherds, an effort was made to convert a raw sherd count into an estimated minimum number of vessels present. This provided a more accurate estimate of the relative proportions of pottery types represented.

The 1967 pottery was assigned to formal types. Several pottery types from different time periods were present. Some of them are listed below:

Type	No. of vessels	Tempering material	Description	Cultural affiliation
Carcajou curvilinear	1	Shell	Consists of shell-tempered, globular jars with restricted orifice, well-defined shoulders, everted rim profile and notched lips. Surface finish is smooth and decoration is applied between the neck and shoulder in the form of interlocking scrolls sometimes with hatched areas, and meanders. Occasionally handles are present. Early examples have angular shoulders. Grand River trailed is similar except for the notched lips.	Upper Mississippian Oneota (Koshkonong and Grand River Foci)
Carcajou plain	28	Shell	Same as Carcajou curvilinear except decoration is limited to lip notching	Upper Mississippian Oneota (Koshkonong and Grand River Foci)
Grand River trailed	3	Shell	Consists of shell-tempered, globular jars with restricted orifice, well-defined shoulders and everted rim profile. Rims are not notched. Surface finish is smooth and decoration is applied between the neck and shoulder in the form of interlocking scrolls, meanders, linear and circular, crescent-shaped and similar elements arranged in patterns. Handles are rare. Carcajou Curvilinear is similar except for the notched lips	Upper Mississippian Oneota (Koshkonong and Grand River Foci)
Grand River plain	59	Shell	Same as Grand River trailed except no decoration	Upper Mississippian Oneota (Koshkonong and Grand River Foci)
Busseyville grooved paddle	2	Shell	Consists of shell-tempered, globular vessels with everted rim profile, squared lip and grooved-paddle impressed surface finish. Similar to Fort Ancient pottery from the Madisonville focus and Danner Paddle-Impressed from the Danner Component of the Zimmerman site	Unknown
Point Sauble collared	1	Grit	Cord-impressed surface, collared rim, row of punctates beneath collar	Late Woodland
Madison plain	7	Grit	Plain surface; some vessels have cord impressions on lip	Late Woodland / Effigy Mound
Madison cord-impressed	2	Grit	Cord-impressed decoration; globular vessel form with restricted orifice and slightly everted rim profile	Late Woodland / Effigy Mound

==== Other artifacts ====
The non-pottery artifacts found at an archaeological site can provide useful cultural context as well as a glimpse into the domestic tasks performed at a site; ceremonial or religious activities; recreational activities; and clothing or personal adornment.

Some of the most prominent and diagnostic non-pottery artifacts are presented here in more detail:

Material	Description	Image	Qty	Function / use	Comments / associations
Chipped stone	Small triangular points (aka Madison points)	Projectile points	24	Hunting/fishing/warfare	Also known as “arrowheads”; are thought to be arrow-tips for bows-and-arrows. The usage of the bow-and-arrow seems to have greatly increased after A.D. 1000, probably as a result of increased conflict.
Bone	Deer jaw sickles	Deer jaw sickles	6	Domestic function / used for scraping maize kernels off the cobs	The presence of these sickles is an indicator of the practice of maize agriculture at the site
Shell	Fish lures	Fish lures	4	Fishing function	Fish remains were common among the animal bone recovered from the site
Shell	Spoons	Shell spoon	4	Domestic function / food preparation-serving	Shell spoons were found as grave goods at the Gentleman Farm site and Fisher Mound Group; they were also present in the Upper Mississippian Heally Complex at the Zimmerman site
Wood	Wooden vessel	Wooden vessel	1	Domestic function / food preparation-serving	Found with a burial; wooden implements are extremely rare in Prehistoric sites because of preservation. This vessel was partially carbonized which prevented it from decaying naturally
Bone	Grooved bone	Grooved bone	1	Unknown	Very rare artifact with unknown function; a similar specimen was recovered from the Moccasin Bluff site in southwest Michigan
Bone	Harpoon	Bone harpoon	1	Fishing function	Similar harpoons have been recovered from the Fisher Mound Group in Illinois and Fifield Site in Indiana
Bone	Bear tusk pendant	Bear tusk pendant	1	Personal adornment and/or ceremonial function	Bear ceremonialism was noted among the early Native American tribes
Bone	Fish hooks	Fish hook	2	Fishing function	Fish remains were common among the animal bone recovered from the site
Copper	Bracelet	Copper bracelet	1	Personal adornment and/or ceremonial function	Bracelet made from copper beads found in a child burial; the photo shows the bracelet in place as it was found on the skeleton
Copper	Serpent-shaped Pendant	Copper pendant	1	Personal adornment and/or ceremonial function	Probably worn as a pendant

== Grand River focus ==
The Walker-Hooper site is the type site of the Grand River focus of the Oneota Aspect, based primarily on details of the pottery. In particular, the Grand River focus pottery tends to have more plain undecorated vessels (other than lip decoration) and handles are very rare. Punctate decoration is also particularly rare. Besides the pottery, Grand River sites are also more often associated with burial mounds.

Along with the Koshkonong and Green Bay Foci, the Grand River focus is considered part of the Developmental Horizon of the Oneota Aspect, dating to approximately A.D. 1000-1300. The radiocarbon dates obtained from the Walker-Hooper site accordingly range from A.D. 1200-1240. The site is thought to have been occupied during a relatively short interval. Based upon the animal and plant remains, it is thought to have been a summer seasonal agricultural village.
