= Oak Forest Site =

Archaeological site in Illinois, United States

- Location in Illinois Location in United States
- 41°44′01″N 87°40′01″W
- Location: in Oak Forest near Chicago, Illinois

Site notes
- Area: 20 acres (8.1 ha)

The Oak Forest Site (11Ck-53) is located in Oak Forest, Cook County, Illinois, near the city of Chicago. It is classified as a late prehistoric to Protohistoric/Early Historic site with Upper Mississippian Huber affiliation.

== History of archaeological investigations ==
In 1958 archaeological remains were noted during construction of a new road by the Oak Forest Hospital. Excavations were carried out in 1958 as a salvage project under the auspices of the Illinois Archaeological Survey.

In 1978, during construction of two new buildings by the Illinois Department of Transportation more archaeological material was noted. A team from Northwestern University conducted a salvage excavation in 1979.

== Results of data analysis ==
Excavations at the site yielded prehistoric to Protohistoric and early Historic artifacts, house structures, pit features, plant remains (1979 excavations only) and animal bone.

=== Features ===
Map of Oak Forest site showing house locations

Map of House 1

A total of 8 house structures and 17 features were identified during the 1958 excavations. The house structures ranged from 25 to 47.5 feet long and 12–15 feet wide. Some of the houses had pit features as well (fire pits and refuse pits).

Most of the features had ash and carbonized material within their fill, and are classified as fire pits. Feature 15 was a bell-shaped storage pit that contained a fragment of iron interpreted by the excavators to be early European in origin.

An additional 55 features were identified in the 1979 excavations. They noted little variation in most of the pits and they may be interpreted as fire, storage or refuse pits. Feature 125 in particular was noted to be a roasting pit similar to those found at other Upper Mississippian-affiliated sites of Zimmerman, Rader, Knoll Spring, Schwerdt, Elam, Griesmer and Moccasin Bluff. At Griesmer the carbonized remains of white water lily (Nymphaea odorata) tubers were recovered and at Schwerdt and Elam, the carbonized remains of American Lotus (Nelumbo lutea)tubers were recovered from this type of roasting pit.

=== Plant Remains ===
No plant remains were reported from the 1958 excavations. This is because flotation data recovery techniques were not in wide use among archaeologists of that era. The 1979 excavations took 42 samples for flotation analysis (24 from features and 18 from midden contexts) and as a result a wide variety of plant remains (wood charcoal, nutshell, maize, seeds and bulbs) were found which contribute immensely to our knowledge of Upper Mississippian subsistence.

Plant analysis of flotation data is based primarily on carbonized remains; on plant material that was burned in a fire pit or hearth but not completely consumed. The carbonized materials are rendered much more resistant to decay and thus are often available for the archaeologist to examine. Not all of the carbonized plant remains are from food items; some of the small seeds recovered may have been intrusive due to the normal seed dispersal process (i.e. the wind just blew them into the fire). Plant material that was not carbonized was of course subject to the normal process of decay and would not be available to the archaeologist except under extraordinary conditions.

Summary of Findings:

- Wood charcoal - the vast majority of all flotation samples (from 82 to 95%) were naturally from the wood that was used as firewood. Each sample showed a great deal of diversity and although oak and hickory were dominant, maple, ash, American hornbeam, American elm, American hop hornbeam, poplar and hawthorn were also present. This mix reflects the trees present in the surrounding deciduous forests and oak savannas.
- Nutshell - was ubiquitous and present in every sample. Hickory nut and black walnut were the dominant species; hazelnut and acorn were also present. Trace amounts of butternut were present in a few features.
- Maize - was the most abundant of the food plant remains. Kernels, cupules and cob fragments of the 8- or 10-row variety were present in all samples.
- Cultivated seeds - 80% of all seeds recovered were of goosefoot (Chenopodium berlandieri), little barley (Hordeum pusillum) and knotweed (Polygonum erectum). This indicates that the Upper Mississippian residents were participants in the Eastern Agricultural Complex (EAC) of cultivated seed plants that predated the introduction of maize in parts of North America. The EAC plants were first identified in Middle Woodland contexts and their use continued to the early Historic period.
- Other cultivated plants - squash, sunflower and the common bean were also present.
- Wild rice - was also present. There is abundant evidence of Native American utilization of this resource in early Historic accounts.
- Fruit seeds - plum, sumac, grape, hawthorn and ground cherry were also noted.
- Bulb - a carbonized bulb of what appears to be wild onion was recovered.
- Noneconomic seeds - seeds from several plants that are present in small quantities and do not have a food or other economic use are presumed to be intrusive; such as Desmodium (ground bulrush), Galium (tick trefoil), Xanthium (cocklebur) and Hypoxis hirsuta (yellow star-grass). Even these intrusive seeds are useful to the archaeologist, because they can be used to help recreate the environment present at the time of site occupation. Some of the intrusive seeds present at Oak Forest indicate a moist marshy environment was nearby, and others indicate a habitat of open fields and oak savannas.

=== Animal Remains ===
Remains from several species were recovered from the site. The main species present were deer and fish; also present were turtle, dog, bald eagle, sandhill crane, otter and others. These remains were not modified into tools like the bone tools described in the Artifacts section below, and may be considered food remains or, in the case of the dog, the remains of ceremonial activities. Dog sacrifice and dog meat consumption was observed to have ceremonial and religious implications in early Native American tribes. In addition, bald eagles, sandhill cranes and otters were known to have spiritual significance in historic Native American religious groups/ceremonies such as the Midewiwin.

=== Artifacts ===
Artifacts recovered from the site included:

- Pottery - total of 1,270 sherds were recovered in the 1958 excavations, and another 3,347 were recovered in 1979. The pottery artifacts will be discussed in more detail below.
- Stone artifacts - including projectile points, scrapers (including humpback scrapers), gravers, graver drills, knives, cores, utilized flakes and a chopper. Of the projectile points, the most numerous category was the small triangular Madison point.
- Ground stone artifacts - including grinding stones, hammerstones/manos, metates, abraders and a piece of hematite that may be a rubstone.
- Bone and antler tools - including scapula hoes, an antler wrench and a harpoon.
- Seashell - a unique duck effigy pendant made out of seashells was present at the site.
- Early Historic artifacts - in 1958, a single iron fragment was found which was thought to be an early Historic artifact of European manufacture. In 1979 many more such remains were found due largely to the use of flotation; including 2 tubular sheet brass hair pipes (similar to the copper specimens found at the Dumaw Creek site), 3 fragments of crumpled sheet brass, 15 iron pieces (6 nails, 1 bolt, 1 washer, a strap with pendant tabs, 2 sheet fragments and 4 unidentified fragments), and a single white glass bead similar to those found at Iroquoian sites in Ontario and New York State (where they have been dated to the early 1600s).

The non-pottery artifacts found at an archaeological site can provide useful cultural context as well as a glimpse into the domestic tasks performed at a site; ceremonial or religious activities; recreational activities; and clothing or personal adornment.

Some of the most prominent and diagnostic non-pottery artifacts are presented here in more detail:

Material	Description	Image	Qty	Function / use	Comments / associations
Chipped stone	Small triangular points (aka Madison points)	Projectile points	33	Hunting/fishing/warfare	Also known as “arrowheads”; are thought to be arrow-tips for bows-and-arrows. The usage of the bow-and-arrow seems to have greatly increased during the Late Woodland, probably as a result of increased conflict.
Chipped stone	Biface blades/knives	Biface knives	6	Domestic function / cutting applications	Typical of Upper Mississippian sites, particularly Huber and Oneota (Orr focus)
Chipped stone	Humpback end scraper	End scrapers	22	Domestic function / processing wood or hides	Typical of Upper Mississippian sites, particularly Huber and Oneota (Orr focus); present at Moccasin Bluff in Michigan where they are called "thick steep-edge" scrapers
Chipped stone	Drills	Drills	2 expanding-base, 5 double pointed	Domestic function / processing wood or hides	2 types are present; expanding base (left) and double pointed (right), which are both common types in Upper Mississippian contexts
Stone	Arrow shaft straightener	Sandstone abraders	3	Domestic function / straightening arrow shafts for bows-and-arrows	Typical at Upper Mississippian sites
Antler	Antler wrench	Antler wrench	1	Domestic function / specific use unknown	Similar artifacts were found at the nearby Anker site
Bone	Bone harpoon	Bone harpoon	1	Fishing function	Similar harpoons made of antler were recovered from the Fisher and Fifield sites
Bone	Scapula hoes	Scapula hoes	28 (fragmentary)	Domestic function / Agricultural-horticultural or general digging tool	Common at Fisher and Oneota sites; they may have been used to dig out the pit features present at Oak Forest.
Marine shell	Marine shell duck effigy pendant	Marine shell pendant	4	Art work / Personal Adornment and/or Ceremonial application	Well-made, unique artifact; found in a burial nearby copper bangles that were probably suspended from it at one time.

=== Upper Mississippian Huber Pottery ===
Huber Phase pottery

Archaeologists often find pottery to be a very useful tool in analyzing a prehistoric culture. Pottery artifacts are common at archaeological sites and the details of manufacture and decoration are considered good indicators of time, space and culture.

Although the Huber tradition was well known by archaeologists for decades following the original excavations at the Huber site in 1929, a formalized typology was not developed until Charles Faulkner devised one in his 1972 report on the Griesmer site in northwestern Indiana, just to the east of Chicago.

Huber pottery is characterized by shell-tempered, plain surface pottery with globular vessel shape and restricted orifices with everted rims. Some vessels also have strap handles. Decoration (when present) usually consists of vertical or obliquely applied incised lines generally running from the lip to the shoulder. Rarely, surfaces are cordmarked or smoothed over cordmarked. The top of the lip is either plain or decorated with fine to wide notching. A minority also have punctate decoration, mostly in combination with the trailed lines.

The 1958 excavations recovered 1,270 sherds, almost all of it Huber ware. Surface was plain on 98% of sherds and cordmarked on 2%. Half of the lips were unnotched. The most common rim profile reported was everted with flat lip and either wide-notched or unnotched lip. Rarely, sherds were red-slipped on the exterior and/or interior.

An additional 3,347 sherds were recovered in the 1979 excavations, of very similar attributes. None of these sherds were reported to be cordmarked except for 3 sherds that were classified as Danner series. 45% of the rims were unnotched and of the decorated sherds, 93% were incised with fine lines.

Following Faulkner's typology, this is the proportion of the pottery types at the site:

- Huber Plain - 88%, characterized by a plain surface
- Huber Trailed - 7%, characterized by a plain surface decorated with fine incised lines
- Huber Bold - 2%, characterized by a plain surface decorated with wide lines, possibly finger-trailed
- Huber Cordmarked - 2.5%, characterized by a cordmarked surface
- Fisher - 0%
- Other types - 0.5%

== Chronology of Oak Forest pottery within the Huber sequence ==
The trends in certain pottery traits are very time-sensitive and can be used as indicators of relative age. Based on information on other Huber sites in the area, archaeologists have determined early Huber pottery is more likely to have cordmarked surface finish; wide-trailed decoration; and notched lips. Early Huber sites have also been observed to have significant amounts of Fisher Ware as well. Late Huber pottery has predominately plain surface finish; fine-line incised decoration; and unnotched lips. A minority also have punctate decoration, mostly in combination with the trailed lines.

In the Oak Forest site assemblage, only 2.5% of sherds are cordmarked, Wide-line decoration is reported to be rare. Also, about half of the lips are unnotched. There is also no Fisher Ware at all in the Oak Forest assemblage; but Danner Ware is present, which has been found in early Historic contexts at the Zimmerman site in northwestern Illinois. This combination of traits indicates a relatively later time placement for Oak Forest within the Huber sequence. This is supported by 6 radiocarbon dates which indicate the occupation of Oak Forest took place between a range of A.D. 1425–1625.

== Huber within the Upper Mississippian culture ==
Huber ware (and Huber culture) are often mentioned together with Fisher. Both Fisher and Huber are Upper Mississippian cultures which existed in the southern Lake Michigan region in the states of northern Illinois and Indiana and southwest Michigan. Both have shell-tempered pottery but Huber is predominantly plain surface with fine-line decoration and Fisher is predominantly cordmarked surface with wide-line decoration.

The relationship of Huber and Fisher both with each other and with other Upper Mississippian cultures in the area has long been a matter of debate and speculation among archaeologists. James Griffin, upon examining the artifacts from the original 1929 excavations, felt that Huber was a Component of the Oneota Aspect based on the form and design of the pottery, close to the Orr and Lake Winnebago foci, and that Fisher was part of a separate focus. Since that date, we’ve obtained a great deal more information and now we know that Fisher is the older of the two and Huber is the one that survived to the Historic period. Nevertheless, both Fisher and Huber coexist at the same sites seemingly at the same time. Hoxie Farm, Griesmer and Moccasin Bluff are examples of this.

Most archaeologists now believe that both Fisher and Huber are taxonomically related phases within the Oneota tradition. The relationship between the two is time-related in that Huber is derived from Fisher; but there are also late Fisher sites like Fifield, where Fisher pottery is associated with late prehistoric artifacts, so it is possible that Fisher also survived until the Protohistoric or early Historic period.

== Significance ==
There is direct evidence of cultivated plants at Oak Forest. The remains of maize were found along with squash and the common bean. Sunflower and wild rice were also recovered. Also, the recovery of knotweed, little barley and goosefoot indicates the Huber culture participated in the Eastern Agricultural Complex. Deer bone was also present in abundance, along with arrowheads for bows-and-arrows, indicating the site residents still relied on hunting; and fish and turtle were also present in the animal bone remains, so they were also exploiting food resources of the nearby marshes and creeks.

With regards to seasonality of occupation, based on the presence of several house structures, and supported by an analysis of the animal bone and plant remains, the researchers determined the site functioned as a permanent to semi-permanent agricultural village.

Along with the Palos site, Oak Forest had some European-made trade articles included in the assemblage. This indicates the Huber culture lasted until European contact and therefore was one of the Historic Native American tribes encountered by the early explorers and fur traders. It has not been conclusively demonstrated which tribe exactly made the Huber pottery. However, the Potawatomi, Illinois and Miami have been recorded as present in the lower shores of Lake Michigan in the early historic period, and all have been suggested as the tribe corresponding to the Huber culture.
