= Summer Island Site =

Archaeological site in Michigan, United States

- U.S. National Register of Historic Places
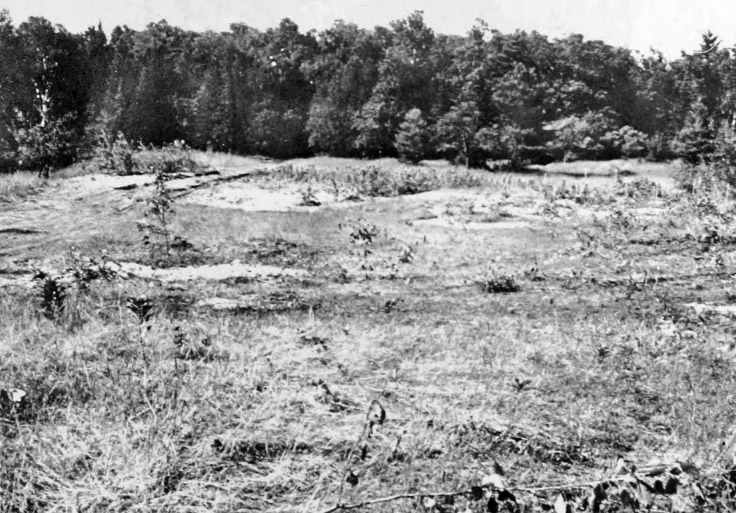
- View of site

- Location within Michigan Location within the United States
- Location: Northwest side of Summer Island, Michigan
- Coordinates: 45°34′0″N 86°38′0″W
- Area: 3 acres (1.2 ha)
- NRHP reference No.: 71000388
- Added to NRHP: September 3, 1971

The Summer Island Site, designated 20DE4, is an archaeological site located on the northwest side of Summer Island, in Delta County, Michigan. It is classified as a stratified, multi-component site with Middle Woodland (c. 100 B.C–500 A.D.), Upper Mississippian (c. 1000–1500 A. D.) and Early Historic/Protohistoric occupations (c. 1500–1700). It was listed on the National Register of Historic Places in 1971.

== Site description ==
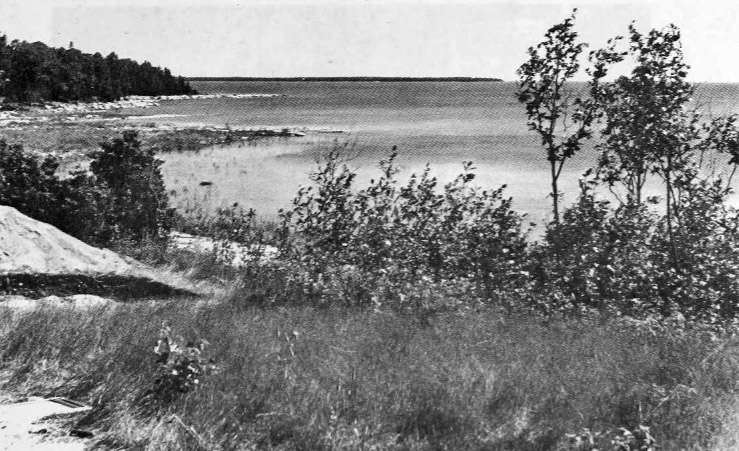
View of the beach

The site lies in a sandy meadow about 20 feet above Summer Harbor on the northwest side of the island, and about "125 feet inland from the best canoe landing area in the entire bay." At the time it was first excavated, cultural material was evident on the surface of the site.

== Archaeological history ==
As early as 1851, this site has been recorded as an abandoned Native American village which was occupied as late as 1770. In 1931, Wilbert B. Hinsdale included it in his Archaeological atlas of Michigan. The site was first excavated by George I. Quimby in 1959. Quimby was able to collect material from the surface, and dug some test pits, finding pot sherds and animal bones. David S. Brose conducted extensive excavations in 1967-68.

== Cultural history ==
The site was most likely utilized by a number of different cultures. The earliest occupiers were likely Middle Woodland period peoples. Based on distinctive pottery associated with different residences, it is likely these people had patrilocal residences. A later part of the Summer Island Site included hearths, a storage pit, and waste pits, and has been ascribed Upper Mississippian culture and Late Woodland period peoples. The inhabitants of the site likely occupied it in the late summer, and ate a variety of game, including mammals (moose and beaver), fish, birds, reptiles, and amphibians. The final occupiers had early French trade goods, indicating they likely used the site around 1620; they used the site as a late summer hunting camp.

A small fishing village of European settlers, believed to be associated with the fishing fleet from St. Martin Island, was established just north of the prehistoric archeological site in the 1800s. The village was occupied by fishermen through at least the end of the 19th century, and then by loggers from Fayette in the early 20th century.

== Results of 1967–1968 excavations ==
The excavations yielded features, artifacts (both historic and prehistoric), animal bone, and plant remains.

=== Features ===
Numerous post molds were found in the Middle Woodland component, representing 4 house structures. Also present were 3 storage pits, 9 refuse pits, 6 hearths, 1 internal platform and 4 drying racks.

Features were also present in the Upper Mississippian (3 hearths, 5 refuse pits and 2 storage pits) and Early Historic (3 refuse pits, 1 storage pit and 2 hearths) components.

=== Artifacts ===
Artifacts recovered from the site included:

- Pottery
- Stone tools
- Bone tools
- Copper tools and artifacts
- Trade beads
- Iron trade artifacts

=== Occupations and associated pottery types ===
==== Middle Woodland ====
The Middle Woodland component was represented by a dense midden containing a rich variety of tools and potsherds. 112 vessels were present in this component. The following pottery types were identified:

- Summer Island banked stamp – plain tool variety/oblique group, 21 vessels; dentate tool variety/oblique group, 13 vessels
- Upper Peninsula Banked stamp – narrow tool variety/vertical group, 14 vessels; narrow tool variety/horizontal group, 5 vessels
- Bay de Non Plain (unbossed variety, notched lip group) (13 vessels)
- Upper Peninsula dragged stamp – dentate tool/oblique, 12 vessels; plain tool/oblique, 11 vessels
- Upper Peninsula banked punctate – fingernail variety, 11 vessels; plain tool/chevron, 6 vessels
- Upper Peninsula linear stamped – braided cord variety, 8 vessels; dentate tool variety, 5 vessels
- Upper Peninsula linear incised (interrupted variety) (4 vessels)

With the large variety of types present, aided by a series of radiocarbon dates and comparisons with pottery of nearby sites, the site investigators present a fine-tuned ceramic chronology of the Middle Woodland in the Upper Great Lakes region. This component was radiocarbon-dated to between 70-250 A.D. and was part of the Northern Tier Middle Woodland tradition, which covered a vast amount of territory in present-day Canada and the northern United States, ranging from Winnipeg to the St. Lawrence River.

==== Upper Mississippian ====
16 vessels were present in this component, which was radiocarbon dated to approximately 1290 A.D. The following types were present:

- Carcajou plain (4 vessels) – characterized by shell tempering, smooth surface, globular pots with sharply everted rims and scalloped lips. This type has been reported at several Wisconsin and northern Michigan sites, including Rock Island II and Carcajou Point. Time Period: Late Prehistoric. Cultural Affiliation: Upper Mississippian Oneota, Koshkonong Phase.
- Koshkonong bold (3 vessels) – characterized by shell tempering, globular vessels with sharply everted, flat rims and finger-pinched lips; and vertical finger-trailed lines applied from the neck to the shoulder of the vessel. Pottery similar to this type has been recorded at other sites in Wisconsin including Carcajou Point. Time Period: Late Prehistoric. Cultural Affiliation: Upper Mississippian Oneota, Koshkonong Phase.
- Point Detour trailed (3 vessels) – characterized by shell tempering, smooth surfaces, globular vessels with sharply everted rims; decoration was in the form of narrow trailed lines forming nested triangles and chevrons, and was confined to the neck and shoulder area. A similar type is Grand River Trailed which has been reported from the Carcajou Point and Walker-Hooper sites in Wisconsin. Time Period: Late Prehistoric. Cultural Affiliation: Upper Mississippian Oneota (possibly Orr phase).
- Delta collared (6 vessels) – characterized by grit tempering, cordwrapped paddle marked surface, slightly everted collared rims with flattened lips. Similar types are Aztalan Collared from the Carcajou Point site; and Point Sable Collared from the Aztalan, Point Sable, Heins Creek and Mero sites, all in Wisconsin. Time Period: Late Prehistoric. Cultural Affiliation: Late Woodland.

==== Early Historic ====
16 vessels were present in this component, which was radiocarbon dated to approximately 1620 A.D. The presence of European trade goods indicate the occupation took place at least partially following initial European contact. The following pottery types were present:

- Bay de Non notched lip (4 vessels) – characterized by grit tempering, cordmarked surface, globular vessels with nearly vertical rims and crimped or notched lips. Similar to Bell Site Type II which has been attributed to the Potawatomi tribe at Rock Island II in Wisconsin. There are also similarities to pottery from Dumaw Creek site in Michigan, which is thought to be the original homeland of the Potawatomi. Time Period: Early Historic. Cultural Affiliation: unknown, possibly Potawatomi.
- Garden incised (3 vessels) – characterized by grit tempering and everted rims and distinctive incised or trailed lines applied to the lip. Similar types in the Wisconsin areas are Bell Site Type I (attributed to the Meskwaki at the Bell site, Wisconsin), Lake Winnebago Trailed, and Perrot Punctate. The lip treatment is similar to vessels at the Dumaw Creek site. Time Period: Early Historic. Cultural Affiliation: unknown.
- Summer Island cordmarked (3 vessels) – characterized by grit tempering, heavily vertical cordmarked surface, and thickened, almost vertical rim. Similar to pottery from the Dumaw Creek and Moccasin Bluff sites in Michigan. At Moccasin Bluff, this type is called Moccasin Bluff Impressed Exterior Lip. Time Period: Late Prehistoric to Early Historic. Prehistoric Cultural Affiliation: Late Woodland. Historic Cultural Affiliation: unknown.
- Lake Winnebago trailed (1 vessel) – characterized by shell tempering, globular vessel with inverted rim and scalloped lip. Similar pottery has been reported from other Wisconsin sites. Time Period: Late Prehistoric to Early Historic. Prehistoric Cultural Affiliation: Upper Mississippian Oneota. Historic Cultural Affiliation: Unknown.
- Ontario Iroquois vessels – two vessels were recovered which the researchers believe came from the Huron and/or Neutral tribes, which are originally from Ontario, Canada. One vessel is similar to Huron Incised or Lawson incised, and the second is similar to Sidey notched. These pottery types have been recorded at sites in Ontario and on Isle Royale in Lake Superior, Michigan. These types have also been reported from the Rock Island II site in Wisconsin where they are present in a Huron/Petun/Ottawa occupation dating c. 1650/51–1653 A.D. This community had been displaced from Ontario during the Iroquois Wars, and later amalgamated into the Wyandot tribe. The Early Historic occupation at Summer Island was radiocarbon dated at 1620 A.D. but the researchers state that the occupation may actually have occurred several decades later.

=== Significance ===
The Summer Island Site is a stratified site with multiple cultural components. Based on the radiocarbon dates, the earliest occupation dates to around 70 through 250 A.D.; the second dates to c. 1290 A.D; and the final coincides with initial European contact, approximately 1620 A.D. or a few decades later. Details of the pottery styles present at the site may be compared to those of other sites to aid in developing a more precise chronology, as well as providing clues to interactions with other cultural groups in Michigan, Wisconsin and beyond.

== See also ==
- National Register of Historic Places listings in Delta County, Michigan
