= Fisher Mound Group =

Archaeological site in Illinois, United States

- Location in Illinois Location in United States
- 41°19′17″N 88°15′00″W
- Location: Will County, Illinois

The Fisher Mound Group is a group of burial mounds with an associated village site located on the DesPlaines River near its convergence with the Kankakee River where they combine to form the Illinois River, in Will County, Illinois, about 60 miles southwest of Chicago. It is a multi-component stratified site representing several Prehistoric Upper Mississippian occupations as well as minor Late Woodland and Early Historic components.

The site contains a total of 12 burial mounds, the main ones being the Big East Mound and the Big West Mound. Around the mounds are 50 house pits.

== History of archaeological investigations ==
George Langford, a mechanical engineer, located the site and excavated it for several years, eventually bringing it to the attention of the archaeological world. According to Langford, he first visited the site in 1898 and by 1906-1907 he was excavating on a small scale with the assistance of Howard Calmer.

In 1922 the site began to be impacted by farming activities and Langford realized the loss of information that was taking place. This spurred him into large-scale excavations with his associate Albert Tennik, starting in 1924. In 1927 Langford issued the first site report. After Langford's work, additional excavations took place under the auspices of the University of Chicago and the WPA.

== Results of data analysis ==
Excavations at the site yielded Prehistoric and Historic artifacts, burials, house structures, pit features, animal bone and plant remains.

=== Stratigraphy ===
Three distinct Upper Mississippian levels were observed in Langford's excavations, each with its own diagnostic artifacts, especially related to changes in pottery styles. There were also differences in skeletal morphology, especially in the shape of the skull. J.W. Griffin in a 1948 paper referred to these levels as “Periods A, B and C”, with Period B having by far the most material.

The surface soil formed a layer to a depth of 3 feet, which Langford called the “Upper Level”. Underneath was a one-inch layer of blackened soil which was called the “Black Seam”. Underneath the Black Seam was 1-1/2 feet of soil and gravel underlain by a 6-inch layer of white ashes, black charcoal, brown earth, bone and shell called the “Ash Layer”. Following these layers carefully, Langford was able to assign each burial to its correct stratigraphic level.

The earliest phase is represented by several “long head” burials without grave goods, in the gravel beneath the Upper Mississippian layers. The upper levels contain small amounts of Late Woodland and Historic materials in disturbed contexts. In between laid the Upper Mississippian deposits.

==== Period A ====
Period A represents the earliest Upper Mississippian phase represented at Fisher. It is located below the Ash Level close to and below the actual ground level. There are no radiocarbon dates available at the Fisher site, but comparisons with sites yielding similar artifacts with radiocarbon dates suggest a time period of approximately A.D. 1100–1300.

The burials associated with Period A are extended burials with short high heads. Most of the pots have shell spoons and had a greasy texture and small fragments of bone, as if they originally contained food when they were buried.

The primary diagnostic artifact of Period A is the distinctive shell-tempered cordmarked pottery with elaborate decoration originally termed “antler-point” pottery by Langford since he assumed the incised lines of decoration were applied in the wet clay by the tip of an antler prior to firing in the kiln. The predominant vessel form was globular with restricted orifice and vertical to excurved rim profile. Lips were frequently notched.

The following non-pottery artifacts were recovered from the Period A deposits. Most of these were grave goods. Significantly, bone artifacts outnumber stone artifacts in both Periods A and B:

- Bone artifacts - detached antler tines, worked fish spine, fish hooks, cut animal jaws, socketed antler projectile points, “golf-tee”-style antler projectile points and celt-like antler scrapers
- Shell artifacts - beads, pendants, hoes, scrapers and spoons
- Chipped stone artifacts - triangular projectile points
- Ground stone artifacts - celts and hammerstones
- Copper artifacts - beads and ear discs
- Mineral - red ochre

==== Period B ====
Period B corresponds to the deposits between the Black Seam and the Ash Layer. It dates to a time period of approximately A.D. 1200-1500 based on comparisons with sites yielding similar artifacts with radiocarbon dates.

The burials associated with Period B are extended burials with differing skull types: short high, long or round heads. Burials 115 and 116 in the Big East Mound contained a unique artifact and bone cache including 3 triangular projectile points, 1 slender projectile point, 2 tarsal bones from turkey and heron, 2 deer ankle bones, 2 beaver incisors, a mink jaw bone, bird bones and antler projectile points. Another skeleton was buried with 2 wildcat humeri, and otter, raccoon and mink skulls.

The house structures present at Fisher are thought to be associated with Period B. They show signs of double-walled design and wall-trench construction like houses found associated with the Heally Component at the Zimmerman site.

The pottery from Period B was grit-tempered with predominantly cordmarked surface finish. Decoration was similar to the shell-tempered ware in Period A but less elaborate. Vessel form was similar except that lip notching was less frequent.

The following non-pottery artifacts were recovered from the Period B deposits. Most of these were grave goods:

- Bone artifacts - detached antler tines, scapula awls, splinter awls, beads, beamers, cut beaver incisors, game counters (antler or bone cylinders often accompanied by a stone tablet, which seemed to comprise a "game set"), perforated deer phalanges, harpoons, antler hoes, fish hooks, mat needles, pins, socketed antler projectile points, “golf-tee”-style antler projectile points, collared projectile points, flat bone projectile points and celt-like antler scrapers. The game counters have been recovered from other sites in the area but have not been reported with the tablets. At Fisher sometimes the counters are stuck to the tablets as if they were originally enclosed in a leather bag when included in the grave goods.
- Shell artifacts - beads, fish hooks, hoes, scrapers and spoons
- Chipped stone artifacts - triangular projectile points and drills (both simple and expanded-base)
- Ground stone artifacts - arrow shaft straighteners, abraders, celtiform tablets (paired with antler game counters, as described above), discoidals, mullers, smoking pipes (equal-arm type), celts and hammerstones
- Copper artifacts - beads, celts and ear discs
- Mineral - red ochre

==== Period C ====
Period C corresponds to the deposits located above the Black Seam. This layer was not clearly demarcated from the Late Woodland and Historic material above it; and in relation to cultural remains was not well-represented compared to the first two periods. The pottery was grit-tempered like the previous period but undecorated. The only artifacts reported were chipped stone projectile points, shell beads and bone harpoons. The time period for this phase is thought to be after approximately A.D. 1500.

=== Animal remains ===
According to Langford, animal bone was common throughout the site. Deer bones predominated but other species were also represented such as elk, bear, dog, wildcat, otter, beaver, mink, weasel, skunk, raccoon, muskrat, rabbit, turkey, heron and goose. These remains were not modified into tools like the bone artifacts described elsewhere, and may be considered food remains or, in the case of some species, the remains of ceremonial activities or grave goods with spiritual significance. Dog sacrifice and dog meat consumption was observed to have ceremonial and religious implications in early Native American tribes. Bear ceremonialism has also been reported in Native American tribes of the American Midwest. Finally, the bones of some animals were used in medicine pouches as part of the practices of medicine societies such as the Midewiwin and False Face Society. The presence of species like mink, wildcat and heron, especially in burials, implies these bones may have been part of medicine bundles intended to accompany the deceased into the afterlife.

=== Plant remains ===
Plant remains were not systematically collected in the Fisher excavations since the use of flotation techniques were not yet widely adopted. However, it was reported that large quantities of maize were recovered and there is little doubt that the Fisher inhabitants were an agricultural society, although hunting still provided for a large portion of their subsistence.

=== Pottery ===
Archaeologists have utilized pottery as a tool in analysing a prehistoric culture. It is can be very plentiful at a site and the details of manufacture and decoration are used as indicators of time, space and culture.

Many complete or reconstructable vessels were found with the Fisher Mound burials, which greatly facilitated the artifact analysis.

In 1927 Langford described the pottery found in the three Upper Mississippian levels, but it was not until 1948 that JW Griffin developed a detailed typology. He called the shell-tempered pottery in Period A Fisher Ware, and the grit-tempered pottery in Periods B and C Langford Ware.

==== Fisher Ware ====
- Fisher Trailed - shell-tempered, globular vessels with cordmarked or smoothed-over cordmarked surface finish and restricted orifice with vertical to excurved rim profile. Lips are often notched. Loop and strap handles, as well as lugs, are sometimes present. Decoration occurs between the rim and shoulder in the form of wide-trailed lines often combined with punctates forming festoons, arches and chevrons. Langford called this style of decoration “antler-point” because it seemed to him that the width and depth of the lines could have been the result of using the point of an antler tine to trace the patterns in the wet clay before the vessel was fired. The presence of antler tines in some of the burials suggested to him that the tools used to create the pot may have been left in the grave along with the vessel itself.
- Fisher Noded - same as Fisher Trailed except for the presence of nodes extruding outward on the surface, created by pressing the wet clay from the interior.

==== Langford Ware ====
- Langford Trailed - grit-tempered with cordmarked or smoothed-over cordmarked surface. Similar decorations as Fisher Trailed except less elaborate, with arches being more common than festoons. Vessel form is similar to Fisher Trailed. Unlike the Fisher ware, notched lips are uncommon, as are handles and lugs.
- Langford Corded - same as Langford Trailed except no decoration
- Langford Plain - same as Langford Trailed except no decoration and surface is not cordmarked
- Langford Noded - same as Langford Trailed except for the presence of nodes extruding outward on the surface, created by pressing the wet clay from the interior.

=== Cultural summary ===
==== Fisher Tradition ====
The Upper Mississippian Fisher Tradition is thought to have emerged after the establishment of the large Middle Mississippian city of Cahokia in the southern part of Illinois in approximately A.D. 1050. The Cahokian culture probably exerted a great deal of influence on the surrounding communities, and recent evidence indicates it was Cahokia that introduced maize agriculture to most of the eastern portion of North America.

Fisher was first identified at the Fisher Mound Group but other sites have been found with similar material culture elsewhere in Illinois as well as northern Indiana and southwestern Michigan (where it is part of the Berrien Phase at Moccasin Bluff). The presence of shell-tempered cordmarked pottery at the Griesmer and Fifield sites in Indiana associated with a radiocarbon date of A.D. 1530 along with late-period artifacts implies that this tradition survived in some form almost until the Protohistoric and/or early Historic Period. This could potentially mean that Fisher represents one of the historic Native American tribes encountered by the early European explorers and fur traders.

==== Langford Tradition ====
The material culture of the Upper Mississippian Langford Tradition has been identified at many sites in the Kankakee, Des Plaines and Illinois River valleys in Illinois. It corresponds to the Heally Component at the Zimmerman site, and is also present at the Plum Island and Gentleman Farm sites on the Illinois River near Zimmerman.

Radiocarbon dates of A.D. 1210-1490 have been reported for Langford, which makes it mostly contemporaneous with Fisher.

The formation of Langford (like Fisher) may be related to the rise of Cahokia, and it has been noted that most Langford sites have small amounts of Middle Mississippian pottery in their assemblages.

== Significance ==
The Fisher site, which was first excavated over a century ago, was one of the first Upper Mississippian sites in Illinois to be investigated intensively by archaeologists. The stratified deposits present at the site aided in the development of a timeline for cultural timeline of the region. As a result, subsequent excavations at Upper Mississippian sites in the American Midwest were often analyzed through the typological framework developed at Fisher. Comparisons with other sites have helped archaeologists define the cultural identity of the Fisher and Langford Traditions and how they relate temporally and spatially with other Upper Mississippian cultures such as Huber and Oneota.
