= Schwerdt Site =

Archaeological site in Michigan, United States

- Location in Michigan Location in United States
- 42°40′00″N 86°00′00″W
- Location: Kalamazoo River near Saugatuck, Michigan

Site notes
- Area: 3 acres (1.2 ha)

The Schwerdt Site (20AE127) is located on the Kalamazoo River in Allegan County, Michigan. It is classified as a single-component Berrien Phase site dating to the late prehistoric period (c.1400-1600 A.D.). The Berrien Phase is associated with the late Woodland but also has some Upper Mississippian influences.

== History of archaeological investigations ==
The site was identified through an archaeological survey by Western Michigan University in 1976. Excavations were conducted under the auspices of Western Michigan University in 1977 and 1979.

== Results of 1977 and 1979 excavations ==
The excavations yielded features, prehistoric artifacts, animal bone, and plant remains.

=== Features ===
A total of 46 features were uncovered at the site, of which 35 were distinctive deep roasting pits. The remains of American Lotus roots were found in 14 of the roasting pits, usually in conjunction with sturgeon bone. Similar pits have been found at two nearby sites on the Kalamazoo River, Elam and Allegan Dam.

=== Animal bone ===
Most of the bone found was from the lake sturgeon. There were also two black bear craniums found near the tops of two features, both with their mandibles removed. A bear cranium was found under similar conditions at the Bell Site in Wisconsin, and the researchers at that site suggested it may be evidence of the prehistoric to early historic practice of bear ceremonialism.

=== Artifacts ===
Artifacts recovered from the site included prehistoric pottery and lithics (stone tools). The majority of the stone tools were small triangular Madison points (aka “arrowheads”). Madison points are commonly associated with late prehistoric (late Woodland) occupations in the Eastern United States.

=== Pottery types ===
Almost all of the pottery found at the site belonged to the late prehistoric Berrien Phase as described at the Moccasin Bluff site, a site on the St. Joseph River in Berrien County, Michigan about 70 miles (110 km) south of Schwerdt.

The pottery types identified / defined at Schwerdt closely match the types reported at Moccasin Bluff:

- Moccasin Bluff Modified Lip (6 vessels) - characterized by grit tempering, smoothed-over cordmarked surfaces, and a folded or crimped lip with cordwrapped stick impression or fingernail impressions on the lip. This type has been identified at the Moccasin Bluff and Ada sites in Michigan, and the Brems site in Indiana. Time Period: Late Prehistoric. Cultural Affiliation: Late Woodland.
- Moccasin Bluff Impressed Exterior Lip (19 vessels) - characterized by grit tempering, smoothed-over cordmarked surfaces and distinctive finger-impressed patterns on the lip. This type has been reported from Brems and Moccasin Bluff. Time Period: Late Prehistoric. Cultural Affiliation: Late Woodland.
- Moccasin Bluff Plain Modified Lip (10 vessels) - characterized by grit tempering, smooth surface and modified/notched lip treatment. This specific type is known only from Schwerdt and Moccasin Bluff. However it may have some relationship to Langford Ware, first noted at the Fisher site in Illinois, which is also grit tempered with similar attributes. Time Period: Late Prehistoric. Cultural Affiliation: Late Woodland.
- Schwerdt Scalloped (20 vessels) - characterized by grit tempering, cordmarked or smoothed-over cordmarked surface, and a distinctive scalloped lip. This type is the Schwerdt equivalent of Moccasin Bluff Scalloped described from the Moccasin Bluff site. At Schwerdt it is sub-divided into 2 groups based on small differences in the type and application of the scalloping. This type has been noted at the Hacklander, Elam and Dumaw Creek sites in Michigan. At Dumaw Creek the pottery was associated with European trade goods, indicating this late Prehistoric type was still being made in the early Historic Period. it was suggested by the researchers that it was the product of an Algonkian-speaking tribe, probably either the Potawatomi or Sauk tribes. Time Period: Late Prehistoric to Early Historic. Prehistoric Cultural Affiliation: Late Woodland. Historic Cultural Affiliation: possibly Potawatomi or Sauk.
- Huber Ware (12 vessels) - characterized by shell tempering and plain surfaces. This ware was first noted at the Huber site in Illinois and has also been reported from Oak Forest, Anker, Zimmerman, Hoxie Farm and Palos sites in Illinois; Griesmer and Brems in Indiana; and Wymer and Moccasin Bluff in Michigan. At Moccasin Bluff it is called Berrien Ware. At Schwerdt, this ware is divided into 4 categories: Schwerdt Group 1-Huber Bold (1 vessel), Schwerdt Group 2-modified lip (3 vessels), Schwerdt Group 3-plain square lip (3 vessels) and Schwerdt Group 4-miniature vessels (5 vessels). Huber ware was found in association with European trade goods at Oak Forest and Palos, indicating this late Prehistoric pottery type was still being made in the early Historic period. The Miami tribe was known to be present in the southern Lake Michigan region, so they could have been the creators of this pottery type. Time Period: Late Prehistoric to Early Historic. Prehistoric Cultural Affiliation: Oneota Aspect, possibly Orr Focus. Historic Cultural Affiliation: unknown, possibly Miami.

== Significance ==
Schwerdt has been interpreted as a single component 15th century seasonal encampment. It has been radiocarbon-dated to c. 1445-1450 A.D. There are no permanent structures and no indication of any agricultural activity. The presence of sturgeon bone and American lotus root suggests spring-early summer occupation, based on the annual spring sturgeon migration. Based on this information, it has been suggested that the site represents one stop on a seasonal round that would also include a semi-permanent, agricultural village.
