= Moccasin Bluff site =

Archaeological site in Michigan, United States

- Moccasin Bluff Site
- U.S. National Register of Historic Places
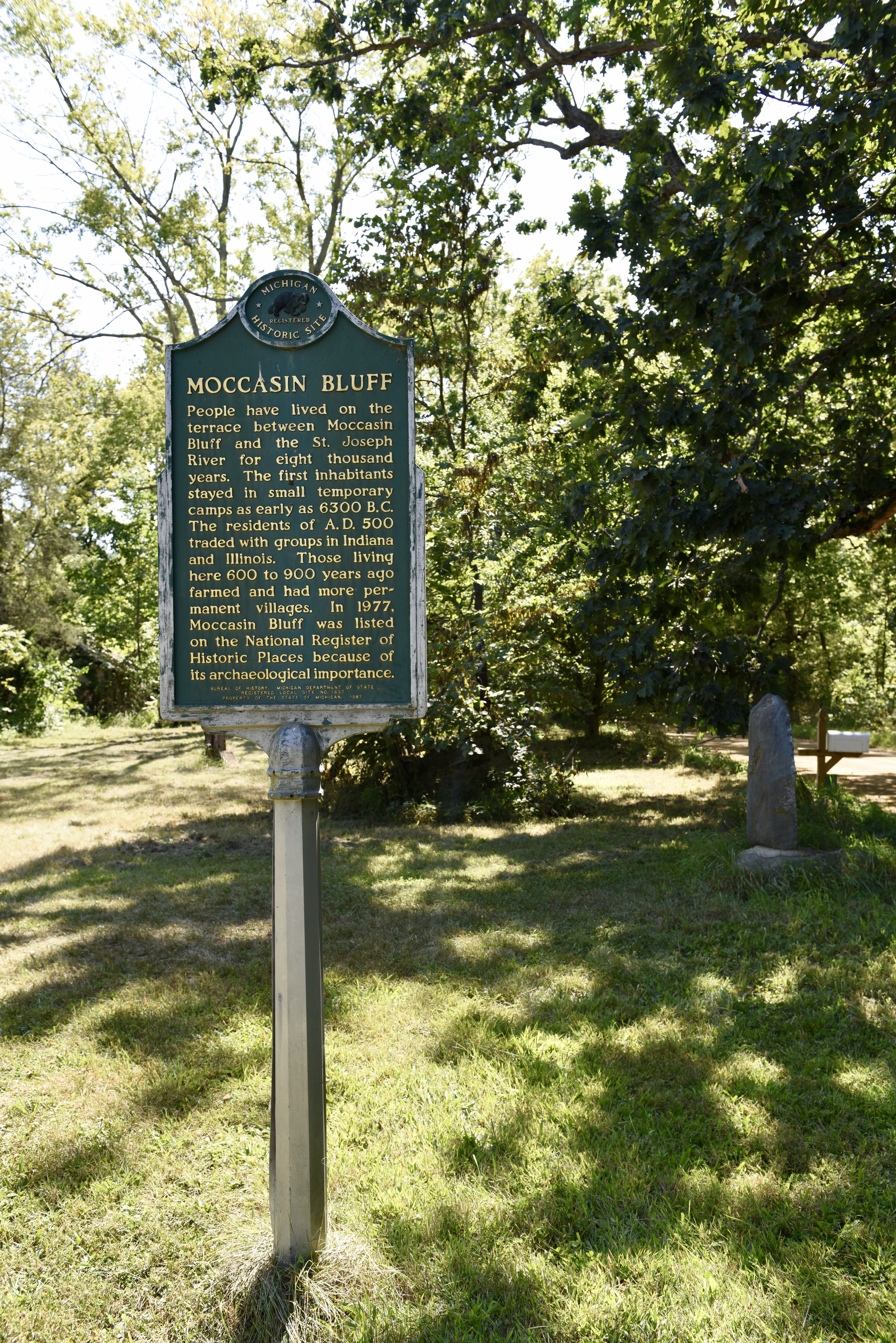

- Location within Michigan Location within the United States
- Location: Red Bud Trail near Buchanan, Michigan
- Coordinates: 41°51′20″N 86°22′0″W
- Area: 5 acres (2.0 ha)
- NRHP reference No.: 77000710
- Added to NRHP: April 13, 1977

The Moccasin Bluff Site (also designated 20BE8) is an archaeological site located along the Red Bud Trail and the St. Joseph River north of Buchanan, Michigan. It was listed on the National Register of Historic Places in 1977, and has been classified as a multi-component prehistoric site with the major component dating to the Late Woodland/Upper Mississippian period.

== History ==
The terrace between Moccasin Bluff and the St. Joseph River was home to temporary camps as early as 6300 B.C. Around A.D 500, inhabitants here traded with other groups of Native Americans from Illinois and Indiana. By A.D. 1100-1400, more permanent villages were established here, and the residents farmed the local lands.

By the late 1820s, European settlers moved into the area to log and farm the land. The US government then adopted a policy of moving the local Potawatomi out of the area and further west. This eventually led to the Potawatomi trail of death. The bluff is said to be named for Cogomoccasin, leader of one of the nearby displaced Potawatomi villages.

In 1948, the site was excavated by a University of Michigan team, which found pottery, burials and remnants of maize and storage pits. In 2002, Michigan State University excavated a wetland area at a lower elevation that had not been previously examined.

== Description ==
The Moccasin Bluff Site is located on a terrace along Red Bud Trail. The terrace overlooks a wide bend in the St. Joseph River containing a pair of islands. The site is protected by a half circle of hills to the north, west and south.

The site is significant in being one of the few prehistoric sites in western Michigan showing evidence of intensive occupation over a long time period. This has resulted in a rich midden which yields a large quantity of artifacts. The deposits are not stratified, but the artifacts themselves, supported by radiocarbon dates and comparison to other sites, are diagnostic of several periods of Native American prehistory, ranging from c. 8500 BC to the 1600s A.D. or just prior to European contact. The Archaic (c. 8500–1500 BC), Early Woodland (c. 1500-100 BC) and Middle Woodland (c. 100BC–500 AD) are represented based on the types of artifacts recovered. However, the main occupation was in the Late Woodland period (c. 500–1500 AD) with evidence of Upper Mississippian (c. 1000–1500 AD) occupation and/or influence as well.

== Results of 1948 excavations ==
The excavations yielded pit features, prehistoric artifacts, animal bone and plant remains.

=== Features ===
There were no trace of dwellings found at the site. Nor were there post molds that might have indicated the presence of structures. The researchers concluded that the lack of structural features may be due to the fact that the main part of the site was destroyed during the construction of the Red Bud Trail Highway.

Four feature types were identified; storage pits (62), fire pits (17), hearths (19) and smudge pits (2). Three burials were located, of which only one was fully excavated.

The fire pits may have functioned as earth ovens for the roasting of the white water lily tuber. No trace of the tubers were found at the site, but in similar pits at the Griesmer site in northwest Indiana the carbonized remains of white water lily tuber were identified; and at the Schwerdt site on the Kalamazoo River in Michigan, the carbonized tubers of a similar water-lily species, American Lotus, were found in deep roasting pits.

Both smudge pits contained the carbonized remains of maize. The contents were analyzed and it was determined to be Eastern Complex maize. Based on previous ethnographic observation, the researchers concluded the features were used as a smudge to cure hides.

=== Animal bone ===
The remains of 32 species were present at Moccasin Bluff. However, when the remains were analyzed to assign pounds of meat present of each species, the results were 32% deer, 27% elk, 8% sturgeon, 6% beaver, 5% bear and 2% dog. These bones were not modified into tools like the bone tools described in the Artifacts section below, and may be considered food remains or, in the case of the dog and bear, possibly the remains of ceremonial activities. Dog sacrifice and dog meat consumption was observed to have ceremonial and religious implications in early Native American tribes. Bear worship and ceremonialism has also been recorded in the ethnological record.

=== Plant remains ===
Charred 8-rowed maize cobs from one of the smudge pits

Specimens of wood charcoal from the fire pits were analyzed and found to be primarily oak, hickory and maple, reflecting the makeup of the local deciduous forest. Some carbonized food remains were identified as acorn, walnut, Canadian plum, butternut and hickory nut. Eastern complex maize was present in the two smudge pits.

=== Artifacts ===
The following types of artifacts were recovered from the site:

- Pottery - No whole or completely reconstructable vessels were found at the site. Therefore the researchers looked primarily at rim sherds and distinctive body sherds to analyze the pottery. The site yielded 534 analyzable rim sherds representing at least 424 vessels. These artifacts are discussed in more detail below.
- Stone Tools - 1,519 stone tools, tool fragments and flakes. Also present were hammer and anvil stones, celts, and abraiding stones.
- Bone tools - present were bone cylinders, beaming tools, antler tools, bone awls, elk scapula tools and turtle carapaces. A bone rasp (musical instrument) fragment was present in the Birdsell collection, a group of artifacts from the site donated by a local collector.
- Stone Pendants - 2 pieces of stone were recovered with holes punched in the middle and were interpreted as pendants.
- Pipes - 6 pipe fragments or unfinished pipe bowls made out of clay or stone.
- Red Ochre - 7 pieces of red ochre were in the University of Michigan Museum of Anthropology collection from the site.

The non-pottery artifacts found at an archaeological site can provide useful cultural context as well as a glimpse into the domestic tasks performed at a site; ceremonial or religious activities; recreational activities; and clothing or personal adornment.

Some of the most prominent and diagnostic non-pottery artifacts are presented here in more detail:

Material	Description	Image	Qty	Function / use	Comments / associations
Chipped stone	Small Triangular points (aka Madison points)	Triangular projectile points	104 (representing 44% of all chipped stone tools)	Hunting/fishing/warfare	Also known as “arrowheads”; are thought to be arrow-tips for bows-and-arrows. The usage of the bow-and-arrow seems to have greatly increased during the Late Woodland, probably as a result of increased conflict. Since there is a large quantity of sturgeon bone at Moccasin Bluff, it is strongly probable that these tools were used in fishing activities.
Chipped stone	Ovate or double pointed blades/knives		3	Domestic function / cutting applications	Some show signs of hafting. Typical of Upper Mississippian sites, particularly Huber and Oneota (Orr focus)
Chipped stone	Bifacially flaked end scraper	End scrapers	22	Domestic function / processing wood or hides	Common at Oneota sites, but usually unifacially flaked rather than bifacial
Chipped stone	Drills	T-shaped drills	6	Domestic function / processing wood or hides	3 types are present; double pointed and expanded base, which are both common types; and T-shaped (pictured) which is usually found on Fort Ancient sites
Chipped stone	Thick "steep-edge" blades/scrapers	Thick, steep-end blades-scrapers	53	Domestic function / woodworking	Reported from Fisher–Huber sites in Illinois
Stone	Abraiding stone		1	Domestic function / straightening arrow shafts	Considered a typical Upper Mississippian trait
Antler	Spatula pieces of antler; chisel/gouge/scraper		5	Domestic function / specific use unknown	Made from elk antler. Not common on sites nearby Moccasin Bluff; has been reported on Whittlesey sites in northern Ohio
Bone	Perforated deer bone (hole punched in the middle)	Perforated deer bone	1	Possibly personal adornment function / pendant	This type of artifact has been reported from the Fisher site and several Fort Ancient sites
Bone	Elk scapula hoes	Elk scapula hoe	3	Domestic function / Agricultural-horticultural or general digging tool	Common at Huber and Oneota sites; sometimes this tool is made with bison scapula, especially westward toward and west of the Mississippi River; they may have been used to dig out the pit features present at Moccasin Bluff.
Bone	unmodified turtle carapace, Common Box Turtle, possibly used as bowl		2	Domestic function / could have been used as tobacco tray, serving bowl for food, or general food container	The use of a turtle carapace as a tobacco tray has been documented among historic Central Angonkian tribes
Bone	Bone rasp (musical instrument) fragment	Bone rasp	1	Ceremonial–recreational function / entertainment or use at ceremony	Also found at Huber, Whittlesey and Fort Ancient sites
Bone	Grooved bone	Grooved bone	1	Unknown function	Not common from sites in the area of Moccasin Bluff; reported from the South Park site in northern Ohio and the Walker-Hooper Site in Wisconsin
Bone	unmodified deer mandibles		"unusually large numbers" according to the site report	Domestic function / used for scraping maize kernels off the cobs	The site report does not state there is any wear on the bones to indicate their usage as a tool; but their presence in large numbers strongly implies it. At other sites they are an indicator of the presence of maize agriculture.
Stone	Pipe bowl fragments; stemless, vase- or bowl-shaped pipe		2	Ceremonial–recreational function / pipe smoking	It has been documented among historic tribes that stemless pipes were used for recreational smoking; ceremonial pipes were stemmed
Stone	Unfinished pipe bowl fragments; stemless, block type		2	Ceremonial–recreational function / pipe smoking	Block style pipes are known from Whittlesey and Fort Ancient sites in Ohio
Clay	Pipe fragments; modified tube-shaped		2	Ceremonial–recreational function / pipe smoking	This type is known from sites in Wisconsin

=== Occupations and associated pottery types ===
Pottery is archaeologically useful for analyzing a prehistoric culture. It is usually very plentiful at a site and the details of manufacture and decoration are indicative of cultural progress and values.

==== Middle Woodland (c. 100 BC–500 AD) ====
A total of 20 vessels of Havana Ware pottery was collected in the 1948 excavations. The Havana Culture was thought to be a local variant of the main Middle Woodland, which was dominated by the Adena and Hopewell cultures of the Mississippi and Ohio River Valleys. Middle Woodland cultures are characterized by their large burial mounds, some of which are still visible today; as well as their distinctive pottery forms, ceremonial practices, agricultural activities, and widespread trade networks.

==== Late Woodland (c. 500 AD–1500 AD) / Upper Mississippian (c. 1000–1500 AD) ====
The Late Woodland period in the Great Lakes region was characterized by the introduction of maize agriculture, which allowed for more efficient food production. This led to population increases which in turn led to increased competition for resources, resulting in more conflict/warfare. After 1000 AD, there was increased interaction and influence from the Mississippian cultures of the Mississippi River Valley, resulting in the formation of Upper Mississippian cultures in the Great Lakes area.

Based on analysis of the Late Woodland / Upper Mississippian pottery collected in the 1948 excavations, 2 distinct types of pottery wares were defined: Late Woodland grit-tempered Moccasin Bluff Ware (327 vessels) and Upper Mississippian shell-tempered Berrien Ware (48 vessels).

===== Moccasin Bluff ware (327 vessels) =====
Moccasin Bluff impressed exterior lip rim sherd

Partially reconstructed vessel of Moccasin Bluff notched applique strip

Partially reconstructed vessel of Moccasin Bluff plain modified lip

Moccasin Bluff ware is divided into several types, some of which have variants, groups and sub-groups:

- Moccasin Bluff cordmarked (97 vessels), characterized by cord marked surface treatment, subdivided into two varieties, Variety 1a and Variety 1b. Variety 1b is further subdivided into 6 sub-groups. Time period: prehistoric. Cultural affiliation: Late Woodland.
- Moccasin Bluff collared (14 vessels), characterized by collared or thickened and sometimes castellated rims, subdivided into 2 subgroups. Time period: prehistoric. Cultural affiliation: Late Woodland.
- Moccasin Bluff modified lip (57 vessels), characterized by distinctive rim and lip treatments, divided into 6 sub-groups. Time period: prehistoric. Cultural affiliation: Late Woodland.
- Moccasin Bluff impressed exterior lip (56 vessels), characterized by distinctive rim and lip treatments, divided into 2 sub-groups. Time period: prehistoric. Cultural affiliation: Late Woodland.
- Moccasin Bluff plain (37 vessels), characterized by a distinctive plain smoothed surface. Time period: prehistoric. Cultural affiliation: Late Woodland.
- Moccasin Bluff plain modified lip (36 vessels), characterized by distinctive notches or finger impressions on the rim, combined with a plain smoothed exterior surface, subdivided into 3 sub-groups. Similar pottery has been found at the Dumaw Creek, Summer Island and Rock Island II sites. Dumaw Creek and Summer Island have been mentioned as possible prehistoric Potawatomi sites, and at Rock Island II, the pottery type Bell Type II has been demonstrated to be a Potawatomi pottery type. Time period: Late prehistoric to Protohistoric or early Historic. Prehistoric Cultural affiliation: Late Woodland. Protohistoric/Historic Cultural affiliation: unknown, possibly Potawatomi.
- Moccasin Bluff notched applique strip (20 vessels), characterized by the thickening of the rim by use of an appliqué strip, upon which various design motifs are applied. Time period: Late prehistoric to Protohistoric or early Historic. Prehistoric Cultural affiliation: Late Woodland. Protohistoric/Historic Cultural affiliation: unknown.
- Moccasin Bluff scalloped (10 vessels), characterized by scalloped treatment of the rim edge. Pottery of this type has been recovered from the Dumaw Creek and Schwerdt sites, as well as other west Michigan sites, where it is suggested it may have been made by the Potawatomi. Time period: Late prehistoric to Protohistoric or early Historic. Prehistoric Cultural affiliation: Late Woodland. Protohistoric/Historic Cultural affiliation: unknown, possibly Potawatomi.

===== Berrien ware (48 vessels) =====
Berrien ware pottery, groups 2 and 3

Berrien ware pottery, group 4

The shell-tempered Berrien ware present at the site is divided into 5 subgroups based on shoulder, neck, surface finish and rim and lip attributes, and can be typed according to 2 previously recognized Upper Mississippian cultures:

- Berrien ware subgroups 1, 2 and 3 - The first 3 subgroups have been equated with Huber ware, and are differentiated by shoulder and neck attributes. Overall, the Huber Ware is characterized by shell-tempered smooth surface pottery which is either undecorated or decorated with incised or trailed lines on the shoulder area. The Huber cultural area is centered on the Chicago area and has been recognized as closely related to the Oneota Aspect in Wisconsin and surrounding states. It is dated to the late prehistoric to the Early Historic or Protohistoric period, as it has been found in association with European trade goods in some sites (c. A.D. 1400-A.D. 1650, or until European contact). The historic culture behind the Huber pottery is not known for certain, but the Miami tribe were observed by early French explorers to occupy the area around the southern shore of Lake Michigan during the Protohistoric to early Historic Period. Miniature vessels have also been found within the Huber component at Moccasin Bluff. These are common at other sites in the area and could be interpreted as “toy” pots or attempts by young children to practice making pottery. Time period: Late prehistoric to Protohistoric or early Historic. Prehistoric Cultural affiliation: Upper Mississippian Huber. Protohistoric/Historic Cultural affiliation: unknown, possibly Miami.
- Berrien ware subgroups 4 and 5 - these subgroups have been equated with Fisher ware, which was first described at the Fisher Mound site in northeastern Illinois near the mouth of the Illinois River. Like Huber, Fisher is also closely related to the Oneota Aspect. Fisher pottery is characterized by shell tempering, predominantly cordmarked surfaces, trailed or incised decoration and straight, excurved or flaring rims. Notched lips and rim lugs are also common. Fisher and Huber seem to overlap spacially, as both cultures have been noted in the Chicago and northwest Indiana regions, sometimes at the same site. The Fisher pottery at Moccasin Bluff is similar to the types Fifield trailed and Fifield bold, defined at the Fifield site, a Fisher village site in northwestern Indiana. Unlike the Huber Ware, Fisher has never been found associated with Protohistoric or early Historic Period sites and is therefore thought to be slightly older than Huber. Time period: prehistoric. Cultural affiliation: Upper Mississippian Fisher.

===== Proposed late prehistoric chronology =====
The large quantity of pottery collected at the Moccasin Bluff Site, in conjunction with comparisons with other sites, enabled the authors of the site report to propose a chronological history of Late Woodland cultures in the western Michigan / northwest Indiana region.

Phase	Date range	Description
Brems phase	c. 500–1050 A.D.	Associated pottery types: Moccasin Bluff modified lip and Moccasin Bluff collared
Moccasin Bluff phase	c. 1050–1400 A.D.	Associated pottery types: Moccasin Bluff impressed exterior lip, Berrien Ware subgroups 4–5 (Fisher ware)
Berrien phase	c. 1400–1650 or first European contact	Associated pottery types: Berrien ware subgroups 1–3 (Huber ware), Moccasin Bluff plain modified lip, Moccasin Bluff notched applique strip and Moccasin Bluff scalloped. This phase has been dated at Moccasin Bluff by two radiocarbon dates of A.D. 1590 and A.D. 1640.

The Berrien phase terminates with the end of prehistory and the beginning of the historic period. The authors of the site report hypothesize that Berrien–Huber ware may be associated with the historic Miami tribe; the Moccasin Bluff Scalloped with an Algonquian-speaking tribe such as the Potawatomi; and the Moccasin Bluff Notched Applique Strip with Ohio tribes who may have been displaced during the Iroquois Wars. Based on the fact that Michigan was traditionally considered the homeland of the Potawatomi, other researchers have also suggested that the Berrien Phase represents the material culture of the Potawatomi tribe.

Notably, there are no European trade goods present in the Berrien phase at Moccasin Bluff. Therefore the site was abandoned at or just before the time of European contact. The same may be said for the Berrien Phase component at the nearby Schwerdt site. The reason for this may be that in the Protohistoric or early Historic period the Potawatomi were displaced from western Michigan as a result of the Iroquois Wars and moved to the west shore of Lake Michigan into Wisconsin. The Rock Island II Site on Rock Island in Green Bay, northern Lake Michigan in Wisconsin is a good example of a Potawatomi village in this early Historic period. As a result, the lower peninsula of Michigan became a "no-mans land", mostly unoccupied for several decades.

== Results of 2002 excavations ==
Further excavations were conducted in 2002 to further clarify questions about the subsistence patterns and site function. Further examples of Moccasin Bluff Ware were recovered; Moccasin Bluff Plain Modified Lip, Moccasin Bluff Impressed Exterior Lip, Moccasin Bluff Scalloped, Moccasin Bluff Cordmarked, and Moccasin Bluff Plain. In addition, there were vessels recovered from the Middle Woodland and also a partially reconstructed vessel from the Early Woodland, a poorly represented time period in the 1948 excavations.

The 2002 excavations used the flotation technique to recover small plant remains, a practice that was not used in earlier times. As a result, numerous small seeds and fruit seeds were recovered. Of the fruits, pin cherry, pokeberry, grape and blackberry/raspberry were present. Of the seeds, several indigenous starchy and oily seed were recovered, including goosefoot, maygrass, knotweed, amaranth, sumpweed, and sunflower. These seeds are part of the Eastern Agricultural Complex, a group of cultivated or semi-cultivated plants utilized by the Prehistoric populations in addition to the better-known crops such as maize, beans and squash. These types of small seeds are not likely to be recovered unless flotation is used, which is why they were underreported and largely unknown until flotation sampling became widespread among archaeologists.

== Site function and Berrien phase settlement patterns ==
The data recovered from the Moccasin Bluff Site shows many indications that the site was occupied for most or all of the year:

- Maize was present at the site, implying it was planted in the spring and harvested in the fall; the presence of numerous deer mandibles implies processing of maize at the site
- The sturgeon spawning run is in the spring, indicating spring occupation
- Nutshell was present, indicating a fall occupation
- Deer may be taken at any time of the year, but in the fall they are at their maximum weight and have grown thicker coats. The early Historic Native American tribes were observed to have an annual fall deer hunt in which the deer were "driven" and killed in mass.
- Focused exploitation of deer and elk to the expense of other available species implies a reliance on an agricultural based economy
- Numerous storage pits were present, implying food was stored over the winter

Based on evidence from the excavations, combined with evidence from the early Historic Native American tribes, it was concluded that the Moccasin Bluff Site represented a permanent or semi-permanent site, with other sites such as Schwerdt serving as temporary encampments to exploit seasonal resources. There are no structures reported from Moccasin Bluff, but the researchers felt that the part of the site containing the houses was destroyed in the building of a highway through the area.

The 2002 excavations found no additional evidence of maize and still no evidence of structures, and some archaeologists are re-thinking the agricultural village interpretation. Since there is a lack of known Late Woodland or Upper Mississippian protohistoric agricultural village sites elsewhere in western Michigan, some researchers are suggesting that perhaps the subsistence pattern was not heavily focused on maize cultivation as was originally thought. Instead, the adaptation of the Berrien Phase population may have been more balanced between hunting, fishing, gathering and limited cultivation of Eastern Agricultural Complex seeds as well as maize.
