= Fifield Site =

Archaeological site in Indiana

- Location in Indiana Location in United States
- 41°34′20″N 87°06′18″W
- Location: on Damon Run Creek near Babcock, Indiana

Site notes
- Area: 4 acres (1.6 ha)

The Fifield Site (Pr-55) is located on Damon Run Creek in Porter County, north-western Indiana. It is classified as a late prehistoric, single-component Upper Mississippian Fisher village.

== History of archaeological investigations ==
Initial excavations were conducted by Robert Skinner in 1949. Follow-up excavations were undertaken by Robert Reichert from 1950 through 1959. Charles Faulkner examined collections from these excavations and performed an analysis which was published in 1972.

== Results of Faulkner’s Analysis ==
The excavations yielded features, Prehistoric artefacts, animal bone, and plant remains.

=== Features ===
Approximately 45 features were encountered during excavations. Most were reported as basin-shaped, storage-refuse pits. There were 8 features showing firing in the bottom that were interpreted as roasting pits.

Several post moulds were uncovered during the Reichert excavations. No house patterns were discerned but Reichert felt that the patterns of post molds indicated structures with rounded walls.

=== Animal bone ===
Approximately 2,713 animal bones were recovered. The most common types of animal remains were deer, dog, elk, beaver, raccoon, bear, bison and turkey. These bones were not modified into tools like the bone tools described in the Artifacts section below, and may be considered food remains.

=== Artifacts ===
Artifacts recovered from the site included:

- Pottery (2,450 sherds from pottery vessels, of which 2,434 are from the Fisher component) - No whole or completely reconstructable vessels were found at the site. Therefore, the researchers looked primarily at rim sherds and distinctive body sherds to analyze the pottery. The pottery artifacts will be described in more detail below
- Stone artifacts 262 chipped stone tools: including 215 projectile points (of which 104 are small triangular points); biface knives (16); humpback end scrapers (22); and drills (20 double-pointed and 5 expanded-hafting area)
- Ground stone artifacts (9) - including 4 abraders (a.k.a. arrow shaft straighteners), 3 celts, 1 pipe fragment and one piece of hematite used to obtain red pigment for paint
- Bone and antler artifacts (61) - including 3 fishhook blanks, 5 antler projectile points, 1 antler harpoon 3 bison scapula hoes, 9 deer cannon bone beamers, 4 bird bone needles, 1 scapula scraper, 8 bone awls, 1 beaver incisor chisel, 1 scapula blade, 2 bird bone beads, 1 antler comb or hairpin, 10 antler cylinders/game pieces, 1 rasp (musical instrument) and 1 whistle
- Copper artifacts (2) - including a copper pendant and a rare serpent figurine
- Sherd pendant (1) with “weeping eye” motif
- Stone pipe fragment (1)
- Circular sherd disc (1)

Reichert's excavations uncovered a cache of domestic implements fashioned from bone and antler, overlain by a layer of what appeared to be red ochre:

- 4 deer cannon-bone beamers
- Bone scraper made from elk or bison bone
- Unmodified piece of cannon-bone which may have been raw material for a tool
- Four needles made of bird bone
- Antler harpoon

These implements would have been used for domestic activities such as processing animal hide, sewing reed mats and making clothes. The cache may have had ceremonial significance because of the presence of red ochre, which was known in early Historic times to be used in a ceremonial context.

Some of the most prominent and diagnostic non-pottery artifacts are summarized and/or illustrated here:

Material	Description	Image	Qty	Function / use	Comments / associations
Chipped stone	Small triangular points (a.k.a. Madison points)	Projectile points	104	Hunting/fishing/warfare	Also known as “arrowheads”; are thought to be arrow-tips for bows-and-arrows. The usage of the bow-and-arrow seems to have greatly increased after c. A.D. 1000, probably as a result of increased conflict.
Chipped stone	Biface blades/knives	Biface knives	16	Domestic function / cutting applications	Typical of Upper Mississippian sites, particularly Huber and Oneota (Orr focus)
Chipped stone	Uniface humpback end scraper	End scrapers	22; all but 2 are bifacially flaked	Domestic function / processing wood or hides	Typical of Upper Mississippian sites, particularly Huber and Oneota (Orr focus)
Chipped stone	Drills	Drills	20 double-pointed; 5 expanding-hafting area	Domestic function / processing wood or hides	2 types are present; double pointed (left) and expanded base (right), which are both common types in Upper Mississippian contexts
Stone	Arrow shaft straightener		4	Domestic function / straightening arrow shafts for bows-and-arrows	Typical at Upper Mississippian sites
Antler	Antler projectile points; socketed and tanged		5; 4 barbed and 1 socketed	Hunting/fishing/warfare	The tanged or barbed type is characteristic of Fisher; the unbarbed type is more typical of Oneota
Antler	Antler harpoon	Antler harpoon	1	Fishing	Also recovered from the Fisher site
Bone	Deer cannon bone beamer		9	Domestic function / hide-working tool	Commonly found at Fisher and Langford sites
Bone	Bison scapula hoes	Bison scapula hoe	3	Domestic function / Agricultural-horticultural or general digging tool	Common at Fisher and Oneota sites; they may have been used to dig out the pit features present at Fifield.
Bone	Bird bone needles		4	Domestic function / sewing mats or clothing	Common at other Upper Mississippian sites.
Antler	Antler comb or hairpin		1	Personal Adornment and/or Ceremonial function	Common at Fort Ancient Madisonville focus sites; may have been used for personal adornment and/or as part of a costume for a ceremony
Antler	Antler cylinders / game pieces		10	Entertainment function	These have been found at Fisher, Huber, Langford and Oneota (especially Grand River focus and Lake Winnebago focus) and may have been used in a gambling game. Gambling was noted to be a popular pastime among the early Native American tribes.
Stone	Equal-arm type pipe fragment	Equal arm type pipe	1	Ceremonial-Recreational function / pipe smoking	This type of pipe has also been recovered at the Fisher and Anker sites.
Copper	Copper pendant	Copper pendant	1	Personal adornment or Ceremonial function	May be part of a larger, broken item that was fashioned into a new ornament
Copper	Copper serpent	Copper serpent	1	Art piece or Religious function	Similar copper serpent figurines have been found at other sites in the American Midwest region: several Oneota Orr focus sites in Iowa; the Anker Site near Chicago, Illinois; the Summer Island site in Michigan; and the Madisonville site in Ohio. The Orr focus sites, Madisonville and Summer Island all have early European trade goods associated, indicating these figurines were still being made at the time of European contact.
Potsherd	Sherd pendant	Sherd pendant	1	Art piece or Religious function	This sherd pendant with the “weeping eye” motif is also indicative of a late prehistoric to early Historic time placement. The weeping eye motif on shell mask gorgets has been observed at several Middle Mississippi sites; at the Anker site near Chicago, Illinois; and the Dumaw Creek site in Oceana County, Michigan. It appears one of the Fifield residents copied this design on a potsherd and made a pendant out of it.
Potsherd	Sherd disc		1	Unknown	The circular sherd disc is a trait of late prehistoric Oneota culture. It has been found at the Zimmerman site in Illinois, in an early Historic context, indicating these objects were still being made at the time of European contact.

=== Fisher ware pottery ===
After 1000 AD, there was increased interaction and influence from the Mississippian cultures of the Mississippi River Valley. The local cultures in the Great Lakes region and surrounding areas influenced by the Mississippians are designated as Upper Mississippians by archaeologists. Some of the cultures designated as Upper Mississippian are the Oneota complex with its various foci. Fisher is closely related to Oneota and some archaeologists consider it to be a focus of Oneota.

Fisher ware was first described at the Fisher Mound site in northeastern Illinois near the mouth of the Illinois River. It has also been noted at the Anker and Boumanville sites near Chicago, Illinois, and the Griesmer site in Indiana.

This pottery is characterized by shell tempering, predominantly cordmarked surfaces, trailed or incised decoration and straight, excurved or flaring rims. Notched lips and rim lugs are also common.

Three specific types of Fisher ware were identified at Fifield:

- Fifield Trailed - characterized by trailed, closely spaced fine to medium horizontal and/or vertical lines over a cordmarked surface; often nested chevron motifs and/or punctates are also present. Notched or crimped lips are common. Some vessels have lugs or handles.
- Fifield Bold - same as Fifield Trailed, with the lines wider and possibly made by the finger rather than an incising tool.
- Fisher Cordmarked - one vessel was found with plain cordmarked surface without decoration, which is rare in the Fisher tradition.

Miniature vessels were also present at Fifield. These are common at other sites in the area and could be interpreted as “toy” pots or attempts by young children to practice making pottery.

Several sherds of Langford Ware, an Upper Mississippian culture from northwestern Illinois, were also present. These sherds were grit-tempered, with either cordmarked or smoothed-over cordmarked surfaces, and are interpreted as trade ware.

== Significance ==
The Fifield site is a single-component Upper Mississippian Fisher site. The pottery styles, along with the presence of certain artifacts such as the copper serpent, sherd disk and weeping eye sherd pendant, indicate the site was occupied almost to the time of European contact. Based upon the type of plant remains and animal bones, and the presence of numerous storage pits, the excavators felt that the season of occupation was fall and winter, and that the site was a semi-permanent agricultural village. No evidence of maize was recovered, but there was no effort made by the excavators to systematically collect plant remains.
