= Griesmer site =

Archaeological site in Indiana, United States

Griesmer Site
- Location in Indiana Location in United States
- 41°11′17″N 87°26′53″W
- Location: on the Kankakee River near Schneider, Indiana

The Griesmer Site (La-3) is located on the Kankakee River in Lake County, Indiana, about a mile southeast of Schneider, in Northwestern Indiana. It is classified as a Prehistoric, multi-component site with Middle Woodland (c. 100 B.C-500 A.D.), Late Woodland (c. 500 A.D.–1500 A.D.) and Upper Mississippian (c. 1000–1500 A. D.) occupations. The deposits were not stratified, but observation of the types of artifacts present, together with radiocarbon dates, helped to define the sequence of occupations at the site.

== History of archaeological investigations ==
The site was excavated under the auspices of the Indiana Historical Society in 1962. Five years later, the site was completely destroyed by sand removal activities.

== Results of 1962 excavations ==
The excavations yielded features, prehistoric artifacts, animal bone, and plant remains.

=== Features ===
Except for a hearth feature, all of the features were associated with the Upper Mississippian occupation. The following types of features were reported:

- Type A – refuse pits (10)
- Type B – deep pits devoid of material (8)
- Type C – deep pits with plant remains including tubers of the white water lily (Nymphaea tuberosa); interpreted as roasting pits (49)
- Type D – deep roasting pits with mussel midden on top (8)
- Type E – cache pit with siltstone discs (1)

A total of 94 post molds were noted, and their placement indicated the presence of at least two structures.

=== Animal bone ===
Over 4,700 animal bones and 8,193 mussel shells were recovered. The most common types of animal remains were turtle, deer, elk and fish.

=== Artifacts ===
Artifacts recovered from the site included:

- Pottery (1,769 pot sherds) – to be discussed in more detail below
- Chipped stone tools (2,113 chipped stone artifacts, of which 301 were tools, including 74 projectile points), 16 biface knives, 7 uniface knives, 4 gravers, 63 scrapers (of which 15 were uniface humpbacked end scrapers), 6 drills, and 2 blades.
- Ground stone tools (5), including a grinding stone, 2 arrow shaft straighteners, 5 hammer stones, and 1 mano/grinding stone
- Bone tools (51), including 3 antler projectile points, 5 scapula hoes (4 from elk scapula and 1 from bison scapula), 1 antler pick, 1 deer skull spoon or scoop, 1 deer cannon bone beamer, 2 scapula knife or scraper, 1 worked beaver incisor, 1 antler flaker, 1 bone flaker, 3 beads, and 5 antler cylinders which may have been used as gaming pieces.
- Pipes – 1 fragment of an effigy turtle head pipe
- Copper artifact (1) – tinkler/cone

The non-pottery artifacts found at an archaeological site can provide useful cultural context as well as a glimpse into the domestic tasks performed at a site; ceremonial or religious activities; recreational activities; and clothing or personal adornment.

Some of the most prominent and diagnostic non-pottery artifacts are presented here in more detail:

Material	Description	Image	Qty	Function / use	Comments / associations
Chipped stone	Small triangular points (aka Madison points)	Projectile points	63, divided into 3 subgroups	Hunting/fishing/warfare	Also known as "arrowheads"; are thought to be arrow-tips for bows-and-arrows. The usage of the bow-and-arrow seems to have greatly increased during the Late Woodland, probably as a result of increased conflict.
Chipped stone	Biface blades/knives	Biface knives	16	Domestic function / cutting applications	Typical of Upper Mississippian sites, particularly Huber and Oneota (Orr focus)
Chipped stone	Uniface humpback end scraper	End scrapers	15	Domestic function / processing wood or hides	Typical of Upper Mississippian sites, particularly Huber and Oneota (Orr focus)
Chipped stone	Drills	Drills	6	Domestic function / processing wood or hides	2 types are present; double pointed and expanded base, which are both common types in Upper Mississippian contexts
Stone	Arrow shaft straightener	Arrow shaft straightener	2	Domestic function / straightening arrow shafts for bows-and-arrows	Typical at Upper Mississippian sites
Antler	Antler projectile points; socketed and tanged	Antler projectile points	3	Hunting/fishing/warfare	The tanged or barbed type is characteristic of Fisher; the unbarbed type is more typical of Oneota
Bone	Deer skull spoon or scoop	Deer skull spoon	1	Domestic function / probably food preparation or serving	This artifact is uncommon and has not been reported for other sites in the area
Bone	Deer cannon bone beamer	Deer cannon bone beamer	1	Domestic function / hide-working tool	Commonly found at Fisher and Langford sites
Bone	Scapula hoes	Elk scapula hoe	5 (4 with elk scapula, one with bison scapula)	Domestic function / Agricultural-horticultural or general digging tool	Common at Fisher and Oneota sites; they may have been used to dig out the pit features present at Griesmer.
Bone	Scapula knife or scraper	Scapula knife or scraper	2	Domestic function / cutting applications	This artifact has been found at other sites in the Midwest, especially Illinois, and is variously defined as a "knife", "scraper", "spade" or "celt"
Bone	Bone beads	Bone beads	3	Personal adornment and/or ceremonial function / hair bead	Common at Upper Mississippian sites; may have been used for personal adornment and/or as part of a costume for a ceremony
Bone	Bone cylinders / game pieces	Antler cylinder game pieces	5	Entertainment function	These have been found at Fisher, Huber, Langford and Oneota (especially Grand River focus and Lake Winnebago focus) and may have been used in a gambling game. Gambling was noted to be a popular pastime among the early Native American tribes.
Stone	Turtle-head effigy pipe fragment	Effigy pipe	1	Ceremonial–recreational function / pipe smoking	Effigy pipes are not common among Upper Mississippian cultures; this item may have been obtained through trade. They are common at Whittlesey sites in northern Ohio, and have been reported from the Late Woodland Dumaw Creek Site in Michigan.

=== Occupations and associated pottery types ===
==== Middle Woodland ====
There was a small Middle Woodland component discovered at the site. Most of the pottery from this component was of the type Havana Ware (also known as Goodall focus). The Havana Culture was thought to be a local variant of the main Middle Woodland, which was dominated by the Adena and Hopewell cultures of the Mississippi and Ohio River Valleys. Middle Woodland cultures are characterized by their large burial mounds, some of which are still visible today; as well as their distinctive pottery forms, ceremonial practices, agricultural activities, and widespread trade networks.

==== Late Woodland ====
The Late Woodland period in the Great Lakes region was characterized by the introduction of maize agriculture, which allowed for more efficient food production. In turn, this led to population increases and this led in turn to increased competition for resources, resulting in more conflict/warfare.

There were a few potsherds which indicated the presence of Late Woodland peoples / cultures at some point. This could have been at any time from the end of the Middle Woodland (c. A.D. 500) to European contact (after 1600 A.D.).

==== Upper Mississippian ====
The Upper Mississippian occupation is the main component at the Griesmer Site. Two radiocarbon dates of AD 1520 and 1530 indicate this site was occupied slightly before European contact.

After 1000 AD, there was increased interaction and influence from the Mississippian cultures of the Mississippi River Valley. The local cultures in the Great Lakes region influenced by the Mississippians are designated as Upper Mississippians by archaeologists. Some of the cultures designated as Upper Mississippian are the Oneota complex with its various foci.

The Fisher and Huber pottery types are the most common encountered during the Griesmer excavations. Fisher and Huber are either considered foci of the Oneota complex by archaeologists, or closely related to Oneota. Charles Faulkner in 1972 developed a typology of pottery descriptions for these two types based on specimens from the Griesmer Site and comparisons with other nearby sites with similar pottery.

===== Fisher ware =====
Fifield bold vessel

Fisher Ware was first described at the Fisher Mound Site in northeastern Illinois near the mouth of the Illinois River. It has also been noted at the Anker and Boumanville sites near Chicago, Illinois, and the Fifield Site in Indiana.

This pottery is characterized by shell tempering, predominantly cordmarked surfaces, trailed or incised decoration and straight, excurved or flaring rims. Notched lips and rim lugs are also common.

Two specific types of Fisher ware were identified at Griesmer and described by Faulkner:

- Fifield trailed (13 vessels) – characterized by trailed horizontal and/or vertical lines over smooth or cordmarked surface; often there are also punctates that form decorative patterns in conjunction with the trailed lines. Notched or crimped lips are also common.
- Fifield bold (3 vessels) – characterized by finger trailed vertical lines over cordmarked surfaces.

===== Huber ware =====
Huber trailed vessel

Huber ware is common at the Huber, Anker, Oak Forest and Hoxie Farm sites near Chicago, Illinois; and at Moccasin Bluff and Schwerdt in southwestern Michigan where it is part of the Berrien Phase. At the Oak Forest Site, this ware has been associated with early Historic artifacts, which indicates the pottery was still being made at the time of European contact. The exact cultural affiliation has not been determined but it has been suggested that the makers of this pottery may be the Miami or Potawatomi tribe.

This pottery is characterized by shell tempering, predominantly smooth surfaces either plain or decorated by fine vertical incised lines, excurved or flared rims, and often fine notching on the lip. Strap handles or loops are present on some vessels. Some of the Upper Mississippian vessels found at Griesmer are identified as coranders based on sherds with holes in them. Coranders are a very rare vessel form in the area. Most of these sherds came from Huber ware. Miniature vessels are also present at Griesmer, and most of them appear to be Huber ware as well.

Four specific types of Huber ware were identified at Griesmer:

- Huber plain (2 vessels) – characterized by plain smooth surfaces with notched lips being the only decoration.
- Huber cordmarked (4 vessels) – characterized by cordmarked shoulder and body and notched or cordmarked lip. This type is very similar to Fisher Cordmarked except for small details in the manufacture and appearance of the cordmarked surfaces, and the fact that Huber Cordmarked surfaces are more often smoothed-over.
- Huber trailed (12 vessels) – characterized by smooth surfaces with fine trailed or incised lines. The lines most often vertical or slant to the right.
- Huber bold – this type was identified only on the basis of body sherds, none of them which could be matched to a rim. The lines are finger-trailed and mostly appear to have been applied vertically.

== Significance ==
The Griesmer Site is a multi-component Prehistoric site with the large Upper Mississippian occupation being the most prominent. The Fisher and Huber pottery, along with the radiocarbon dates, indicate the site was occupied almost to the time of European contact. The excavators felt that the season of occupation was late spring to early summer, and that the site was a short-term encampment instead of a permanent agricultural village. A similar short-term encampment has been identified at the Schwerdt Site on the Kalamazoo River in southwestern Michigan. Schwerdt had similar deep roasting pits with water lily tubers present along with sturgeon bone. The ceramics at Schwerdt were designated as Berrien Phase; including shell-tempered pottery which can be assigned to Huber ware, along with grit-tempered local Late Woodland types.

Unfortunately it cannot be said with confidence which cultural or tribal entities created the Fisher and Huber pottery at Griesmer, but the Potawatomi and Miami have been suggested, based on the fact that both of these tribes were present in the area during early Historic times.
