= Rock Island II Site =

- Rock Island Historic District
- U.S. National Register of Historic Places
- U.S. National Historic Landmark
- Location within Wisconsin Location within the United States
- Location: south side of Rock Island
- Coordinates: 45°24′55.16″N 86°49′14.99″W
- NRHP reference No.: 72000050 (NRHP listing), 100009834 (NHL designation)

Significant dates
- Added to NRHP: May 19, 1972
- Designated NHL: December 11, 2023

The Rock Island II Site is an archaeological site located on the south side of Rock Island, in Door County, Wisconsin, United States, at the mouth of Green Bay, within the boundaries of Rock Island State Park. It is classified as an Early Historic site with occupations by the Potawatomi, Wendat (Huron), Petun, Odawa and Wyandot peoples. It was listed on the National Register of Historic Places in 1972, and was designated a National Historic Landmark in 2023. It is one of the best-preserved sites documenting early Native-European contacts in the Great Lakes region.

== Discovery ==
Cultural remains had been reported on Rock Island and the neighboring islands as early as 1915. Intensive excavations were undertaken from 1969 to 1973 under the auspices of Lawrence University. The large amount of cultural remains and extensive research into historic records revealed that Rock Island was the island called “Island of the Pouteouatamis” AKA “Island of the Hurons” by early French explorers. Through careful examination of the archaeological record, the researchers were able to match 4 major occupation zones to historically recorded Native American occupations. These Native American tribes were in fact native to Michigan and Ontario, but had become displaced as a result of the Iroquois Wars.

== Results of 1969–1973 excavations ==
The excavations yielded features, artifacts (both historic and prehistoric), human bone, animal bone, and plant remains.

=== Features ===
Several features were present at the site:

- 15 storage/refuse pits
- The remains of 4 buildings
- A cemetery with 14 burials
- Palisade trenches

=== Artifacts ===
Approximately 80,000 artifacts were collected at the site. Some were made by the Native American inhabitants and some were trade goods obtained from the Europeans:

- Pottery (over 35,000 sherds with at least 336 vessels represented)
- Stone tools
- Smoking pipes
- Animal effigies
- Catlinite artifacts
- Bone and antler tools
- European trade goods including glass trade beads, gunflints, gun parts, lead shot, musket balls, iron knives, metal arrowheads, firesteels, glass bottle fragments, remelted glass pendants, religious medallions, lead bale seals, and Jesuit rings

==== Occupations and associated pottery types ====
===== Initial Potawatomi occupation (c. Post-1641, pre-1650/51 A.D.) =====
The dominant pottery style is Bell site type II, first noted at the Bell site, located in Winnebago County, Wisconsin. This is another site whose occupants were displaced from Michigan; in this case from the Meskwaki. Bell site Type I pottery was the predominant pottery style at that site. Bell site type II was a minority type at the Bell site but a majority type at the Potawatomi occupations of the Rock Island II site; and therefore the researchers concluded the Potawatomi were in fact the makers of the Bell site type II pottery.

Bell site type II is represented by numerous vessels at Rock Island II but some notable examples include vessels C6, C7, C8 and C9. This type is characterized by globular round-bottomed vessels with grit tempering, cordmarked exterior surface underneath a smoothed neck, and often having scalloped, crimped, cordmarked or notched rims. Time period: Early Historic. Cultural affiliation: Potawatomi.

===== Huron-Petun-Odawa (Proto-Wyandot) occupation (c. 1650/51-1653 A.D.) =====
These three tribes had a short 2–3 year occupation between the two Potawatomi occupations. The tribes of this occupation were decimated by the Haudenosaunee in the Iroquois Wars. Their remnants fled to Wisconsin and amalgamated into the Wyandot tribe.

The pottery of this occupation included some known types of the Huron and Petun and also some late Prehistoric types that apparently crossed over into the Historic period at this site:

- Bell site type II (see above)
- Huron incised – vessel C1 is an almost complete reconstructed pot of this type; it is a semi-globular, round bottom pot characterized by grit tempering, well smoothed surface, collared rim with incised or stamped lines, and well-defined shoulder with diagonal punctates. Time period: Early Historic. Cultural affiliation: Huron.
- MacMurchy scalloped – vessel G1 is a good example of this type; it is characterized by grit tempering, smoothed neck with cordmarked surface beneath the neck, and collaring underneath the rim edge with vertical incised or stamped lines on the collar. Time period: Early Historic. Cultural affiliation: Ontario Iroquois (Huron or Petun)
- Allamakee trailed – Vessel C21 is a good example; it is characterized by shell tempering, smooth surface, undecorated neck with punctated and incised decorations on the shoulder and fingernail impressions on the lip. Vessel C22 is another example, which also exhibits a strap handle, another trait of Orr Phase pottery. Time period: Late Prehistoric to Early Historic. Prehistoric Cultural affiliation: Upper Mississippian Oneota, Orr Phase. Historic cultural affiliation: unknown but possibly Ho-Chunk (Winnebago).
- Michipicoten stamped rim – Vessel J22 is an example of this type. It has a cordmarked body and rim and a smoothed neck. Time period: Early Historic. Cultural affiliation: Ontario Iroquois (Huron and Petun)

===== Main Potawatomi occupation (c. 1670-1730 A.D.) =====
The dominant pottery type of this occupation was Bell site type II (see above) but the following were also present:

- Bell site Type 1 – Vessel E19 is a good example of this type. It is grit-tempered, with hard, smooth surface finish and rounded shoulder, everted rim and punctuated lip. Time period: Early Historic. Cultural affiliation: Fox.
- Aztalan Collared – Associated with Madison Ware. Vessel E28 is an example of this type. It has a cordmarked surface with cord-wrapped stick impressions along the shoulder and rim. Time period: Prehistoric Late Woodland to Early Historic. Prehistoric Cultural affiliation: Effigy Mound. Historic cultural affiliation: Unknown.

===== Odawa occupation (c. 1760-1770 A.D.) =====
The cemetery dates to this occupation. By this date, the Native Americans had almost completely ceased to make the native pottery, but there is at least one vessel of Bell site type II pottery present.

== Significance ==
Excavations at the Rock Island II site have made some important contributions to archaeology in the Great Lakes region. It revealed the location of the famous “Island of the Pouteouatamis” described by early French explorers. It identified for the first time the material culture of the Potawatomi, in the form of Bell type II pottery. It also demonstrates for the first time archaeological evidence of the amalgamation of the Petun and Huron peoples into the Wyandot. Finally, it helped demonstrate the persistence of certain Late Prehistoric pottery types, such as Madison Ware and Orr Phase Oneota, into the Early Historic period.

In 2020, a nomination was submitted for the site to be designated as a National Historic Landmark.
