= Dumaw Creek Site =

Archaeological site in Michigan, United States

- U.S. National Register of Historic Places
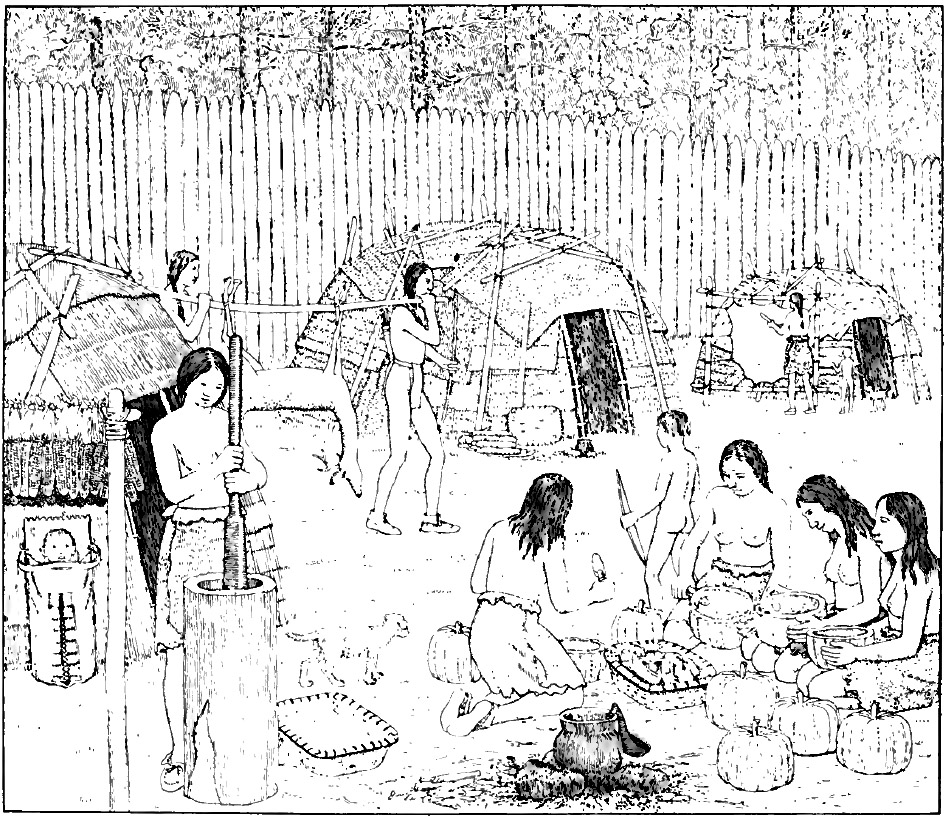
- Artist's conception of village

- Location within Michigan Location within the United States
- Location: Dumaw Crk, NE of Pentwater, Michigan
- Coordinates: 43°48′30″N 86°22′30″W
- Area: 50 acres (20 ha)
- NRHP reference No.: 72001477
- Added to NRHP: November 15, 1972

The Dumaw Creek Site is an archaeological site designated 20OA5, located along Dumaw Creek northeast of Pentwater, Michigan, that was the location of a 17th-century village and cemetery. It is one of the youngest pre-historic sites in Michigan, dating to the terminal Late Woodland Period just prior to European contact. It was listed on the National Register of Historic Places in 1972.

== History ==
The village that once stood at this location was likely inhabited in the early part of the 17th century (about 1605–1620, according to Quimby). The people occupying the village are thought to be the precursors of the modern Potawatomi people. It is likely that they were uprooted from this location soon after Samuel de Champlain's 1615 visit to the region, as warring tribes spilled into Michigan. Were they the Potawatomi people, they eventually made their way by the 1640s to the region around Sault Ste. Marie.

Meanwhile, white pine grew up in the plain where the village stood. The pine was lumbered in 1870-1880, after which the land was gradually converted to agricultural use, and was farmed as late as 1930. In the 1940s, oil was discovered in the area, and wells were installed.

The Dumaw Creek site was originally discovered in 1915 by a farmer, Christoph "Carl" Schrumpf 1854–1949, who was pulling a stump from his field. Schrumpf discovered 18 skeletons and various artifacts in 1915–16. These artifacts were catalogued by the Museum of Anthropology at the University of Michigan in 1924, but the artifacts and records were not generally well known by archaeologists. Schrumpf eventually sold the collection to a private dealer, and they eventually made their way, sans any identifying data, to George I. Quimby at the Field Museum in 1959.

Quimby eventually tracked the source of the artifacts to the Dumaw Creek site, and in 1960-62 did some summer surface collection there. He also located other artifacts already dug from the site.

== Description ==
The Dumaw Creek site is located on a sandy plain near Dumaw Creek, a tributary of the Pentwater River, at a site not easily accessible by canoe. The creek itself runs through a small valley about 30 feet (9.1 m) beneath the level of the plain. The site, covering 50 acres (20 ha), was used as a village and burial ground.

The village is thought to have been a semi-permanent settlement with dome-shaped wigwams. The people hunted and fished, and grew corn and pumpkins.

== Artifacts ==
Artifacts and features found at the site include burials, faunal remains, stone tools, bone tools, red ocher/mineral paint (used for ceremonial coloring), copper artifacts, shell artifacts, tobacco pipes, animal skins, and vegetal and textile remains.

At least nineteen, and perhaps as many as 55 skeletons were removed from burial sites in the Dumaw Creek site. The bodies were wrapped in furs and buried with stone implements and copper beads.

The stone implements found include arrowheads, knives, and scraping tools of chipped flint and axes of a hard, granular stone. Quimby reports that 99% of the stone tools were small triangular points or arrowheads, a.k.a. Madison points, indicative of a Late Woodland period placement. There were also a considerable number of copper artifacts found at the site. Many were large bead-like tubes of copper known as hair pipes, which were worn as hair ornaments. There were also other, generally smaller copper beads, conical decorations, and copper plaques, as well as shell beads and pendants. Carved stone pipe bowls were also found, as well as animal skins and pottery.

The pottery is described by Quimby as grit-tempered vessels with round-bottomed, globular forms with broad orifices and slightly flaring rims. The rim edges are often scalloped or crimped. The vessel pictured below with a scalloped rim has been compared to the Moccasin Bluff Scalloped type from the Moccasin Bluff site on the St. Joseph River in southwestern Michigan. This pottery type is diagnostic of a Late Woodland period temporal placement, just before European contact. There was also a shell pendant with a "weeping eye" design as shown below. This motif has been seen in other Late Prehistoric sites in the Great Lakes area.

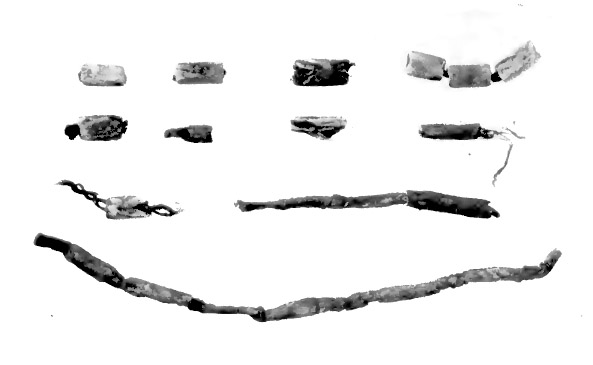
Copper and shell beads

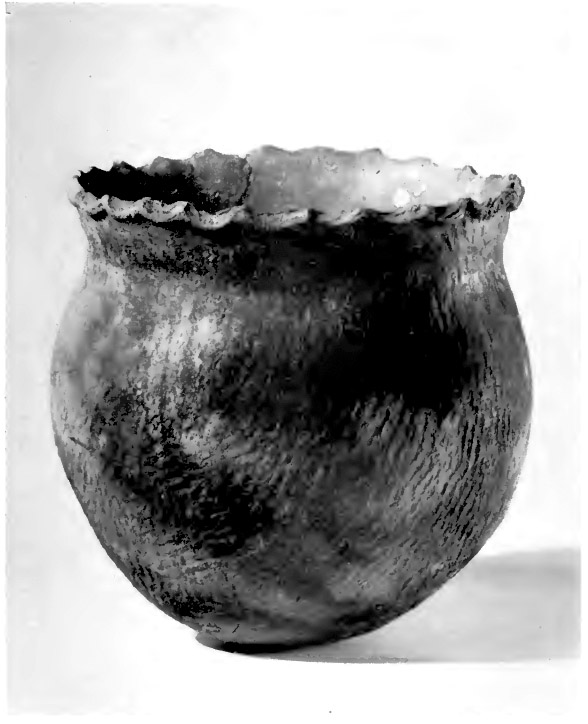
Pottery vessel with scalloped rim

Pottery vessel with exterior lip impressed

Pottery rim sherds with modified lips

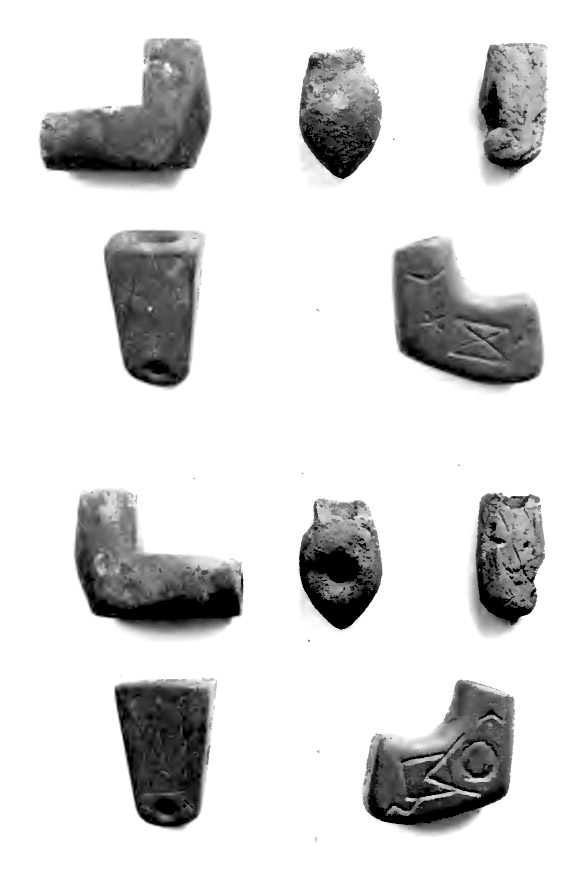
Stone pipes

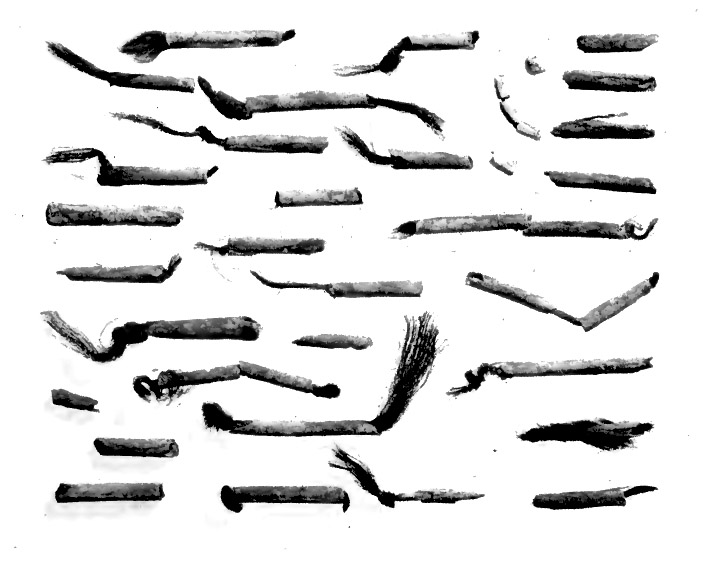
Copper hair pipes

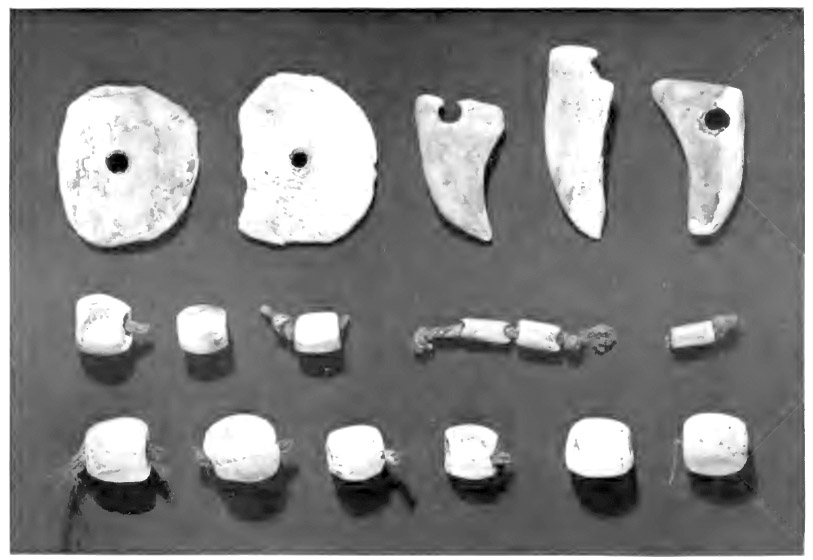
Shell beads

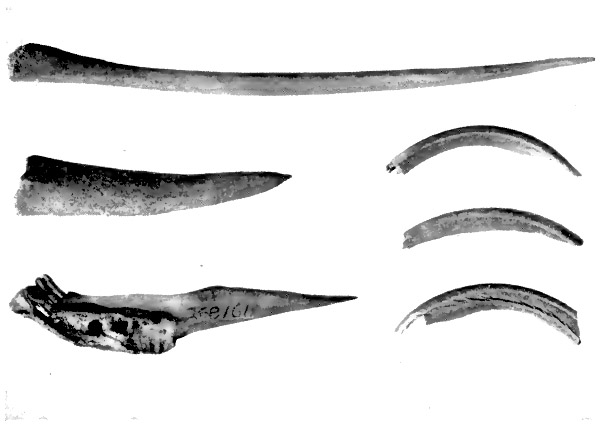
Bone artifacts

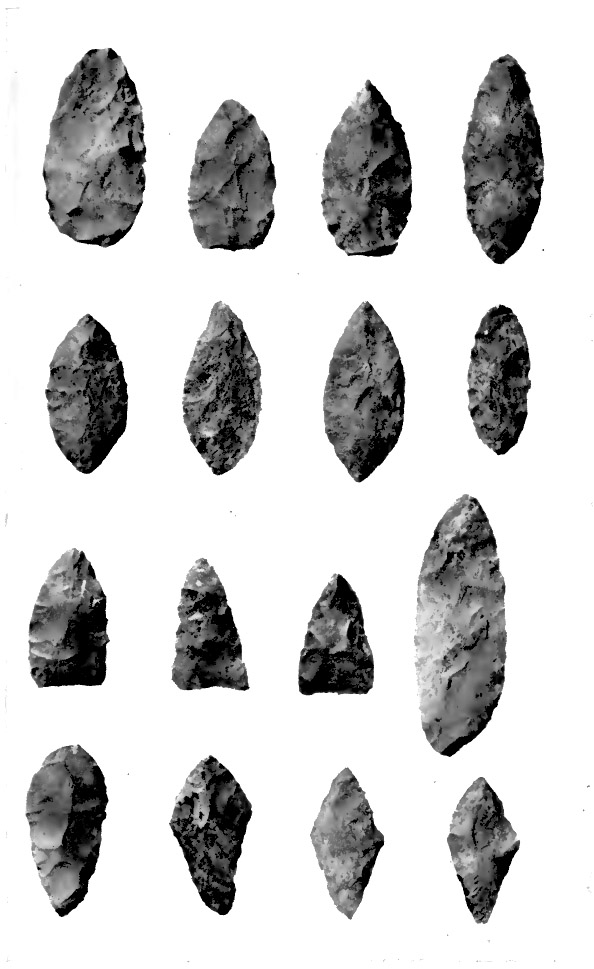
Stone knives

Diagram of design on shell pendant
