= Oneota =

Native American culture

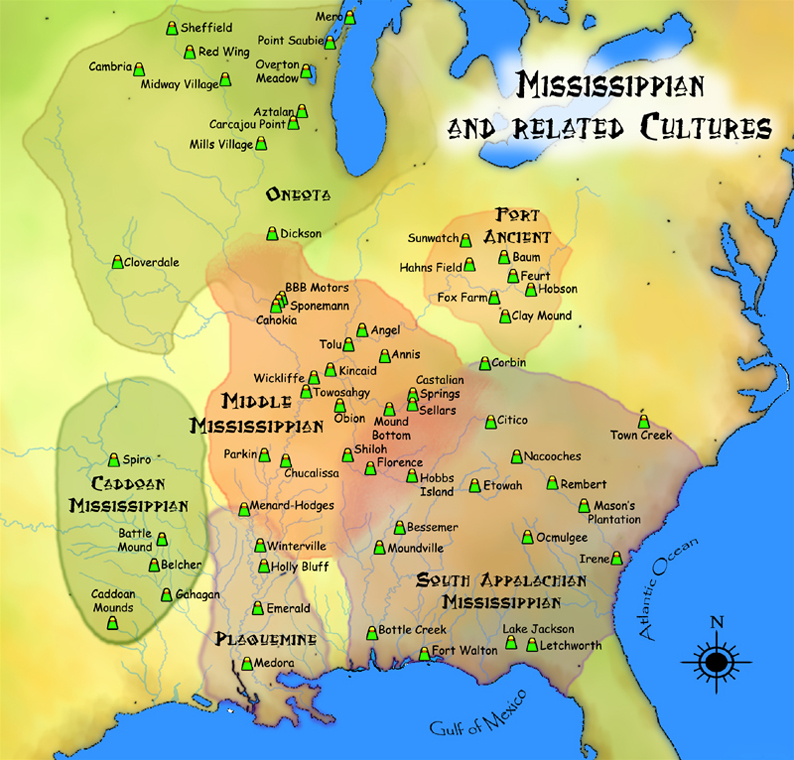
A map showing approximate areas of various Mississippian and related cultures, including the Oneota.

In archaeology. Oneota is a cultural complex that existed in the Eastern Plains and Great Lakes area of what is now the United States from around AD 900 to around 1650 or 1700. Based on the classification defined in Gordon Willey and Philip Phillips' 1958 book Method and Theory in American Archaeology, the Oneota culture belongs to formative stage. The culture is believed to have transitioned into various Siouan cultures of the protohistoric and historic times, such as the Ioway.

Oneota is considered a major component of Upper Mississippian culture. It is characterized by globular, shell-tempered pottery that is often coarse in fibre. Pieces often had a spherical body, short necks and/or a flat lip. Sometimes the vessels had strap handles. Decoration includes wavy and zigzag lines, often in parallel. Most decoration was done on the top half of the vessel. One site occupied by the Oneota people for a period was the Aztalan site beside the Crawfish River in Wisconsin.

Analytically, the culture has been broken down into various stages or horizons. Generally accepted are the following:

- Emergent Horizon (c. AD 900-1000),
- Developmental Horizon (c. AD 1000-1300),
- Classic Horizon (c. AD 1300-1650) (previously called the Oneota Aspect),
- Historic Horizon (post-contact, generally after 1650).

In addition, the Oneota culture has been divided geographically based on stylistic and socio-economic differences. Some of these traditions are Orr, Langford, and Fisher-Huber.

The Oneota diet included corn, beans, squash, wild rice, nuts, fish, deer, and bison, varying according to the region and locale.

Relationships with Middle Mississippian were present but are not yet clearly understood. Whether Oneota developed in situ out of Late Woodland cultures, was invasive, was the result of influence from (proto-)Middle Mississippian peoples, or was some mix of these, is not clear.

== See also ==
- Mississippian culture
- Toolesboro Mound Group
- Upper Mississippian culture

== Sources ==
- Gibbon, Guy E. (1982) Oneota Studies.
- Green, William (ed.)(1995) Oneota Archaeology: Past, Present, and Future.
- Iowa. Office of State Archaeologist. [1976?] Oneota. [Iowa City, Iowa] : Office of the State Archaeologist.
