= Euthera fascipennis =

Scientific classification
- Kingdom: Animalia
- Phylum: Arthropoda
- Class: Insecta
- Order: Diptera
- Family: Tachinidae
- Subfamily: Dexiinae
- Tribe: Eutherini
- Genus: Euthera
- Species: E. fascipennis

Binomial name
- Euthera fascipennis (Loew, 1854)

Synonyms
- Ocyptera fascipennis Loew, 1854; Euthera manni Mik, 1889

Species of fly

Euthera fascipennis is a species of fly in the family Tachinidae. Hosts include Halys dentatus, Apodiphus amygdali, and Dolycoris baccarum.

== Distribution ==
Tajikistan, Croatia, Greece, Italy, Malta, Portugal, Spain, Turkey, Tunisia, Malawi, Tanzania, Yemen, India, Taiwan.
