= Euschistus ictericus =

Scientific classification
- Kingdom: Animalia
- Phylum: Arthropoda
- Class: Insecta
- Order: Hemiptera
- Suborder: Heteroptera
- Family: Pentatomidae
- Genus: Euschistus
- Species: E. ictericus

Binomial name
- Euschistus ictericus (Linnaeus, 1763)

Species of true bug

Euschistus ictericus is a North American species of shield bug. It grows up to 12 mm (0.5 in) long, and lives in damp areas.

== Distribution ==
In Canada, E. ictericus is restricted to Ontario and Quebec. In the United States, its distribution reaches as far south as Texas and Louisiana, and only as far west as Utah, despite previous reports that its range extended from coast to coast.

== Description ==
E. ictericus grows to a length of 10.5–12 millimetres (0.41–0.47 in), and can be distinguished from other members of the "brown stink bug complex" by the lack of black spots in the middle of the ventral side of the abdomen, and by the presence of black rings around the spiracles on the abdomen.

== Ecology ==
E. ictericus lives in damp situations, on Carex comosa, Iris versicolor, Nymphaea odorata, Saururus cernuus, willows, Carduus horridulum, Heracleum maximum, Cuscuta, Glycine max, Vicia faba, Verbascum thapsus, Juncus, Perillus frutescens, polygonum densiflorum and Persicaria punctata. It is attacked by Euthera tentatrix, Beskia aelops and Cylindromyia euchenor (Tachinidae) and by the eastern meadowlark, Sturnella magna. E. ictericus is not commercially important as a pest.
