= R. spectabilis =

R. spectabilis may refer to:

- Reithrodontomys spectabilis, the Cozumel harvest mouse, a rodent species
- Rubus spectabilis, a flowering plant species

== Synonyms ==
- Redtenbacheria spectabilis, a synonym of Redtenbacheria insignis, a fly species
