= Euthera setifacies =

Scientific classification
- Kingdom: Animalia
- Phylum: Arthropoda
- Class: Insecta
- Order: Diptera
- Family: Tachinidae
- Subfamily: Dexiinae
- Tribe: Eutherini
- Genus: Euthera
- Species: E. setifacies

Binomial name
- Euthera setifacies Brooks, 1945

Species of fly

Euthera setifacies is a species of fly in the family Tachinidae.

== Distribution ==
Canada, United States.
