= Euthera peringueyi =

Scientific classification
- Kingdom: Animalia
- Phylum: Arthropoda
- Class: Insecta
- Order: Diptera
- Family: Tachinidae
- Subfamily: Dexiinae
- Tribe: Eutherini
- Genus: Euthera
- Species: E. peringueyi

Binomial name
- Euthera peringueyi Bezzi, 1925

Species of fly

Euthera peringueyi is a species of fly in the family Tachinidae.

== Distribution ==
India.
