= Nymphaea alba subsp. occidentalis =

Scientific classification
- Kingdom: Plantae
- Clade: Tracheophytes
- Clade: Angiosperms
- Order: Nymphaeales
- Family: Nymphaeaceae
- Genus: Nymphaea
- Species: N. alba
- Subspecies: N. a. subsp. occidentalis

Trinomial name
- Nymphaea alba subsp. occidentalis (Ostenf.) Hyl.

Synonyms
- Nymphaea alba var. occidentalis Ostenf.; Nymphaea occidentalis (Ostenf.) Moss

Species of plant

Nymphaea alba subsp. occidentalis is a subspecies of Nymphaea alba native to western and northern Europe.

== Description ==
=== Vegetative characteristics ===
Nymphaea alba subsp. occidentalis is an aquatic, rhizomatous, perennial plant. The relatively small leaf is 9–13 cm long.

=== Generative characteristics ===
The relatively small, 5–8(–12) cm wide flowers do not open widely. Stamens are absent towards the upper end of the ovary. The gynoecium consists of 8–15 carpels.

== Taxonomy ==
It was first described as Nymphaea alba var. occidentalis Ostenf. by Carl Hansen Ostenfeld in 1912. It was elevated to the rank of the subspecies Nymphaea alba subsp. occidentalis (Ostenf.) Hyl. published by Nils Hylander in 1945. Some sources treat it as a synonym of Nymphaea alba, but others accept it as a subspecies. Within the subgenus Nymphaea subg. Nymphaea , it is placed in the section Nymphaea sect. Nymphaea.

=== Etymology ===
The subspecific epithet occidentalis means western.

== Ecology ==
It occurs in small, nutrient poor aquatic habitats in ponds, marsh pools, small lakes, and sheltered bays of larger lakes.

== Distribution ==
It is native to Belgium, Denmark, Finland, France, the United Kingdom, Ireland, Norway, and Sweden.

== Conservation ==
It is very rare. In Sweden, it is classified as vulnerable (VU). In the United Kingdom, it is of national conservation concern.
