= Current Lake =

Lake in the state of Minnesota, United States

- Location of the lake in Minnesota.
- Location: Murray County, Minnesota
- Coordinates: 44°9′52″N 95°56′47″W
- Type: lake
- Surface area: 377 acres (1.53 km^{2})
- Max. depth: 9 feet (2.7 m)
- Surface elevation: 1,657 feet (505 m)

Current Lake (also spelled Currant Lake) is a lake in Murray County, in the U.S. state of Minnesota. It is found at the elevation of 1,657 feet (505 m) with an area of 377 acres (1.53 km^{2}) and a max depth of 9 feet (2.7 m)

Current Lake derives its name from the currant trees near the lake.
