= Euthera barbiellinii =

Scientific classification
- Kingdom: Animalia
- Phylum: Arthropoda
- Class: Insecta
- Order: Diptera
- Family: Tachinidae
- Subfamily: Dexiinae
- Tribe: Eutherini
- Genus: Euthera
- Species: E. barbiellinii

Binomial name
- Euthera barbiellinii Bezzi, 1925

Species of fly

Euthera barbiellinii is a species of fly in the family Tachinidae.

== Distribution ==
It is found in Brazil.

== Ecology ==
This species is known to parasitize Thyanta perditor.
