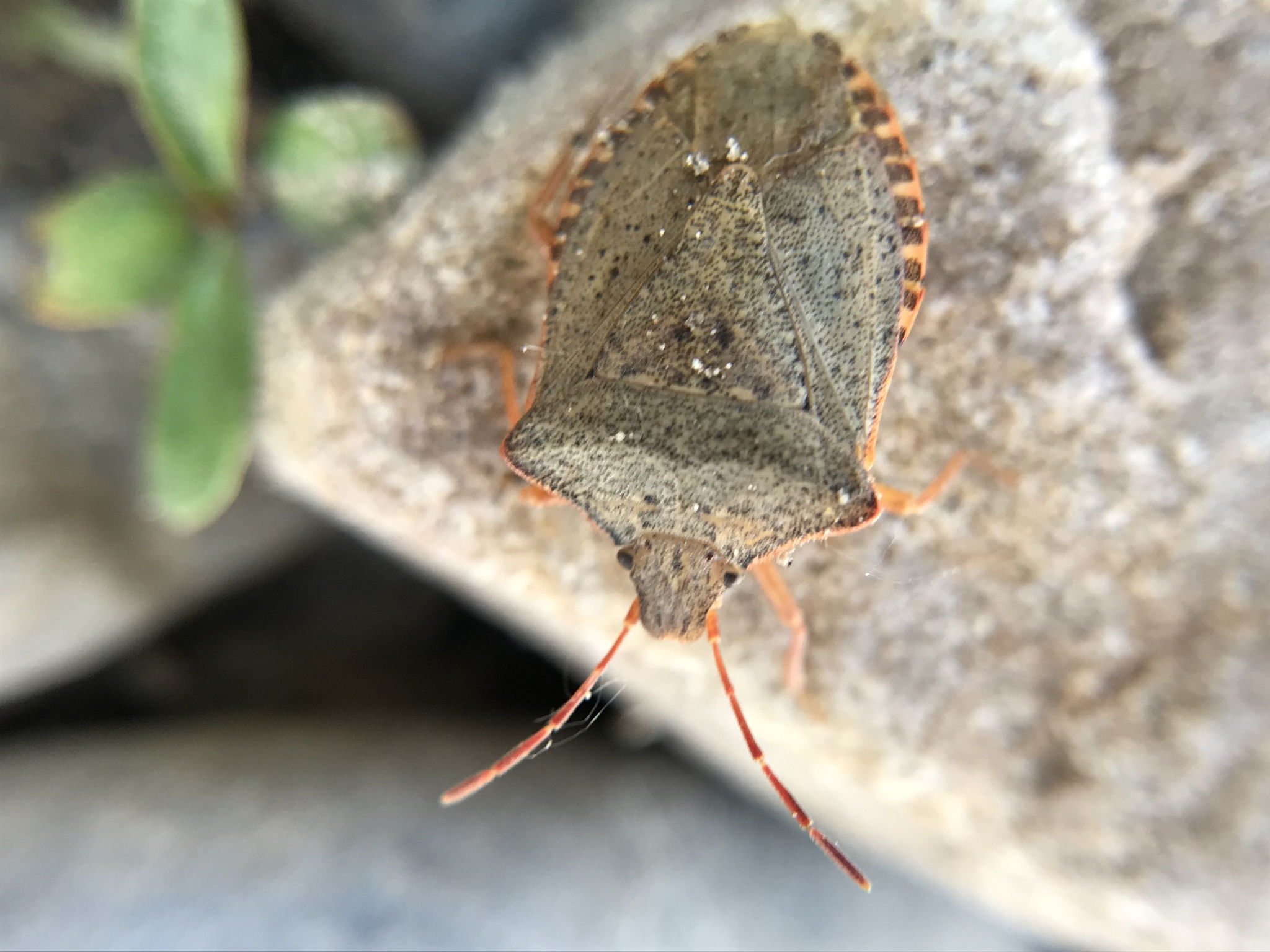

Scientific classification
- Kingdom: Animalia
- Phylum: Arthropoda
- Class: Insecta
- Order: Hemiptera
- Suborder: Heteroptera
- Family: Pentatomidae
- Tribe: Carpocorini
- Genus: Euschistus
- Species: E. inflatus

Binomial name
- Euschistus inflatus Van Duzee, 1903

= Euschistus inflatus =

Species of true bug

Euschistus inflatus is a species of stink bug in the family Pentatomidae. It is found in North America. Host plants include Rubus arizonensis, Verbascum thapsus, sugar beets, and green beans.
