= Nymphaea × borealis =

Scientific classification
- Kingdom: Plantae
- Clade: Tracheophytes
- Clade: Angiosperms
- Order: Nymphaeales
- Family: Nymphaeaceae
- Genus: Nymphaea
- Section: Nymphaea sect. Nymphaea
- Species: N. × borealis

Binomial name
- Nymphaea × borealis E.G.Camus

Synonyms
- Nymphaea alba subsp. borealis (E.G.Camus) M.H.J.van der Meer

Species of water lily

Nymphaea × borealis is a species of waterlily native to Sweden, Poland, Germany, the Netherlands, the Czech Republic, and East European Russia. It is a natural hybrid of Nymphaea alba and Nymphaea candida.

== Description ==
Parent species of the natural hybrid
Nymphaea × borealis E.G.Camus

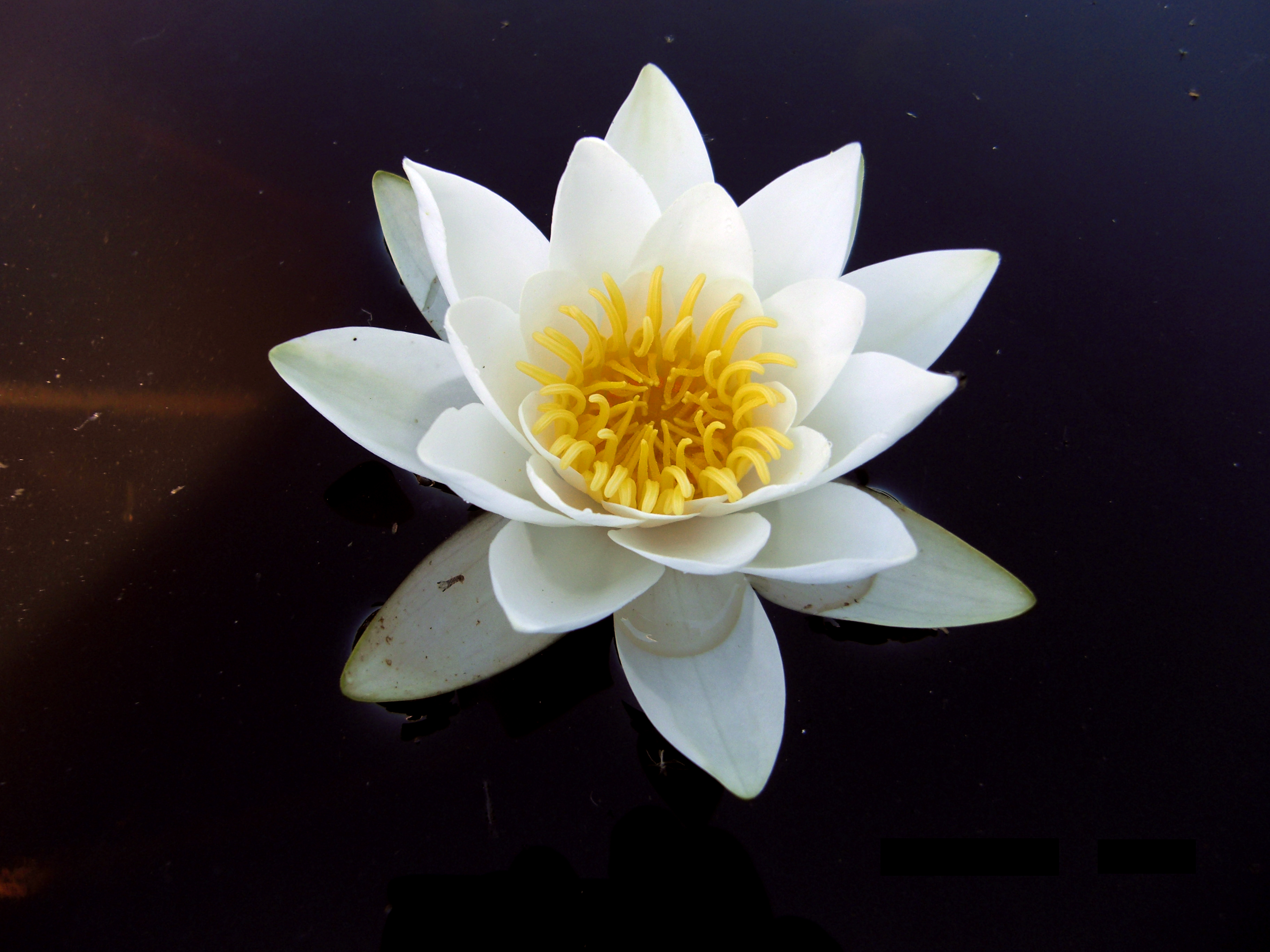
Nymphaea alba L.

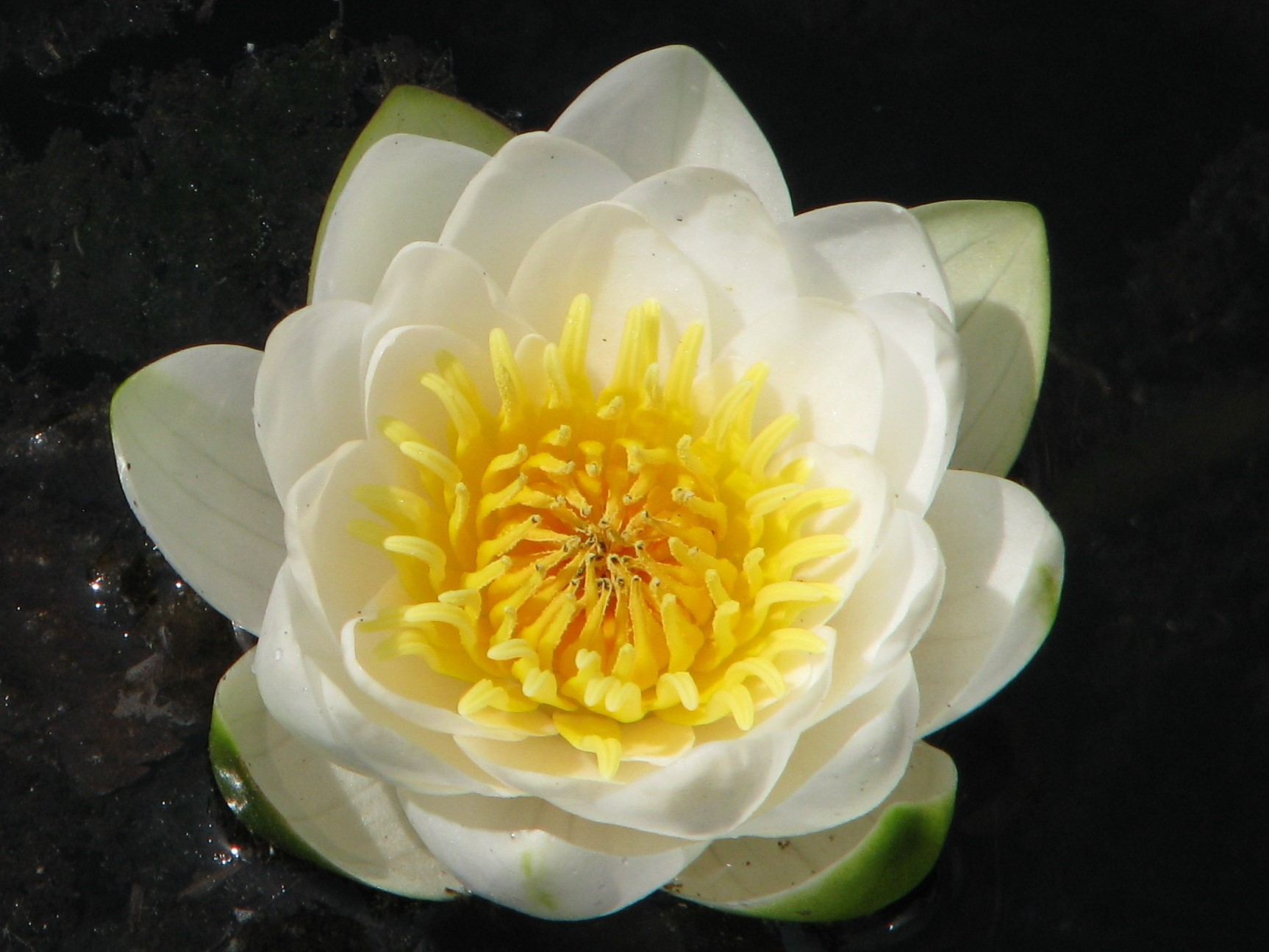
Nymphaea candida C.Presl

=== Vegetative characteristics ===
The primary leaf nervation of the basal lobes is slightly arched.

=== Generative characteristics ===
The floral base is tetragonous. The filament is lanceolate. The gynoecium consists of 14–18 carpels. The slightly concave, yellow stigmatic disk has a hemispherical, short projection in the centre.

=== Cytology ===
It exhibits an intermediate genome size.

== Reproduction ==
=== Generative reproduction ===
Nymphaea × borealis exhibits lower fertility and pollen production.

=== Natural hybridisation ===
Nymphaea × borealis can be formed in areas of sympatric occurrence of the parent species, but the natural hybridisation of both parent species is not very frequent. Genetically confirmed hybrids are a rare occurrence.

== Taxonomy ==
It was first described by Edmond Gustave Camus in 1898.

=== Etymology ===
The hybrid name borealis means north or northern.

== Ecology ==
It is a host plant to the phytopathogenic fungus species Rhamphospora nymphaeae.
