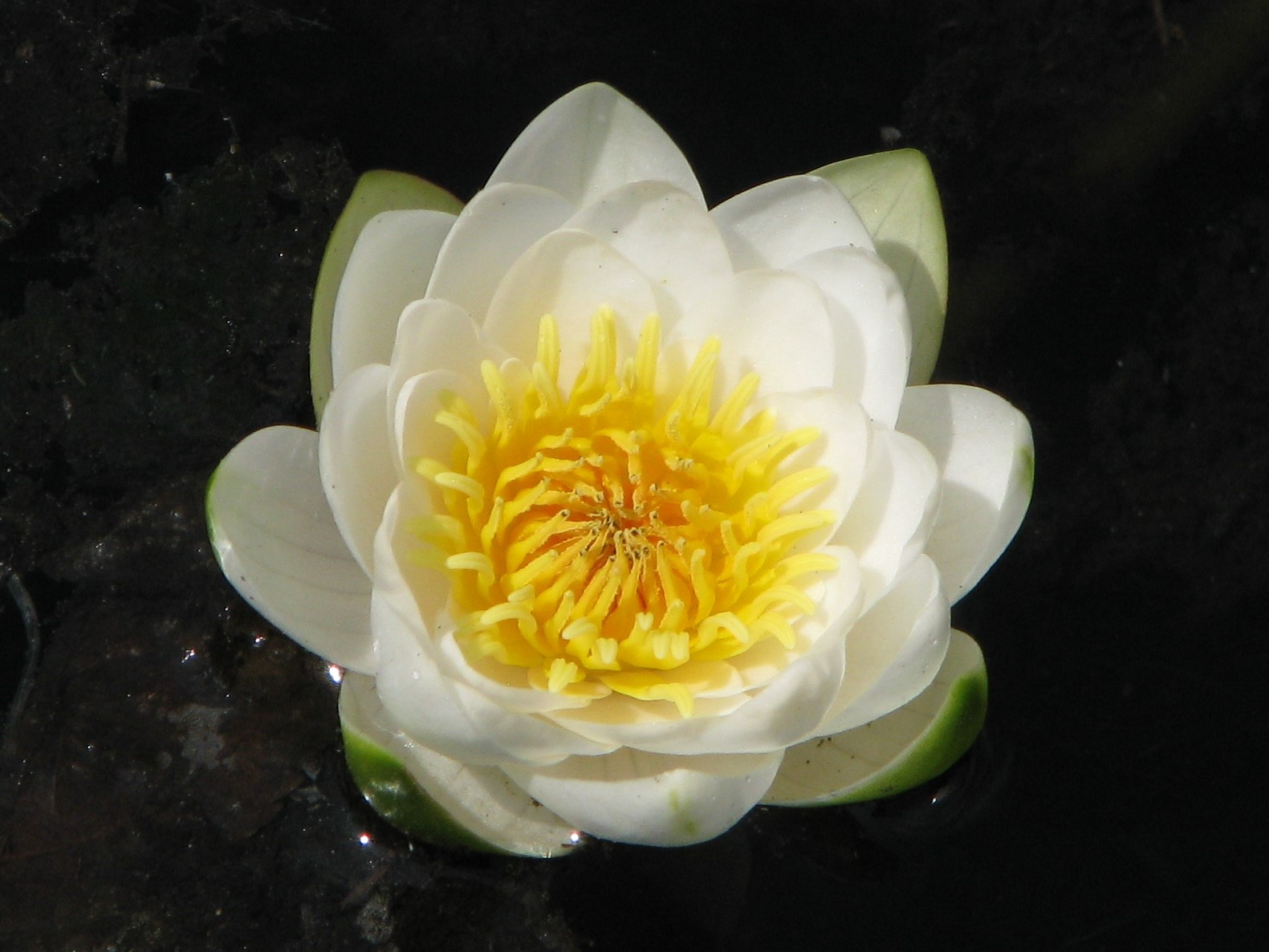
- Nymphaea candida flower

Scientific classification
- Kingdom: Plantae
- Clade: Embryophytes
- Clade: Tracheophytes
- Clade: Angiosperms
- Order: Nymphaeales
- Family: Nymphaeaceae
- Genus: Nymphaea
- Subgenus: Nymphaea subg. Nymphaea
- Section: Nymphaea sect. Nymphaea

Species
- See here.

= Nymphaea sect. Nymphaea =

Section of aquatic flowering plants

Nymphaea sect. Nymphaea is a section within the subgenus Nymphaea subg. Nymphaea of the genus Nymphaea native to North America and Europe.

== Description ==
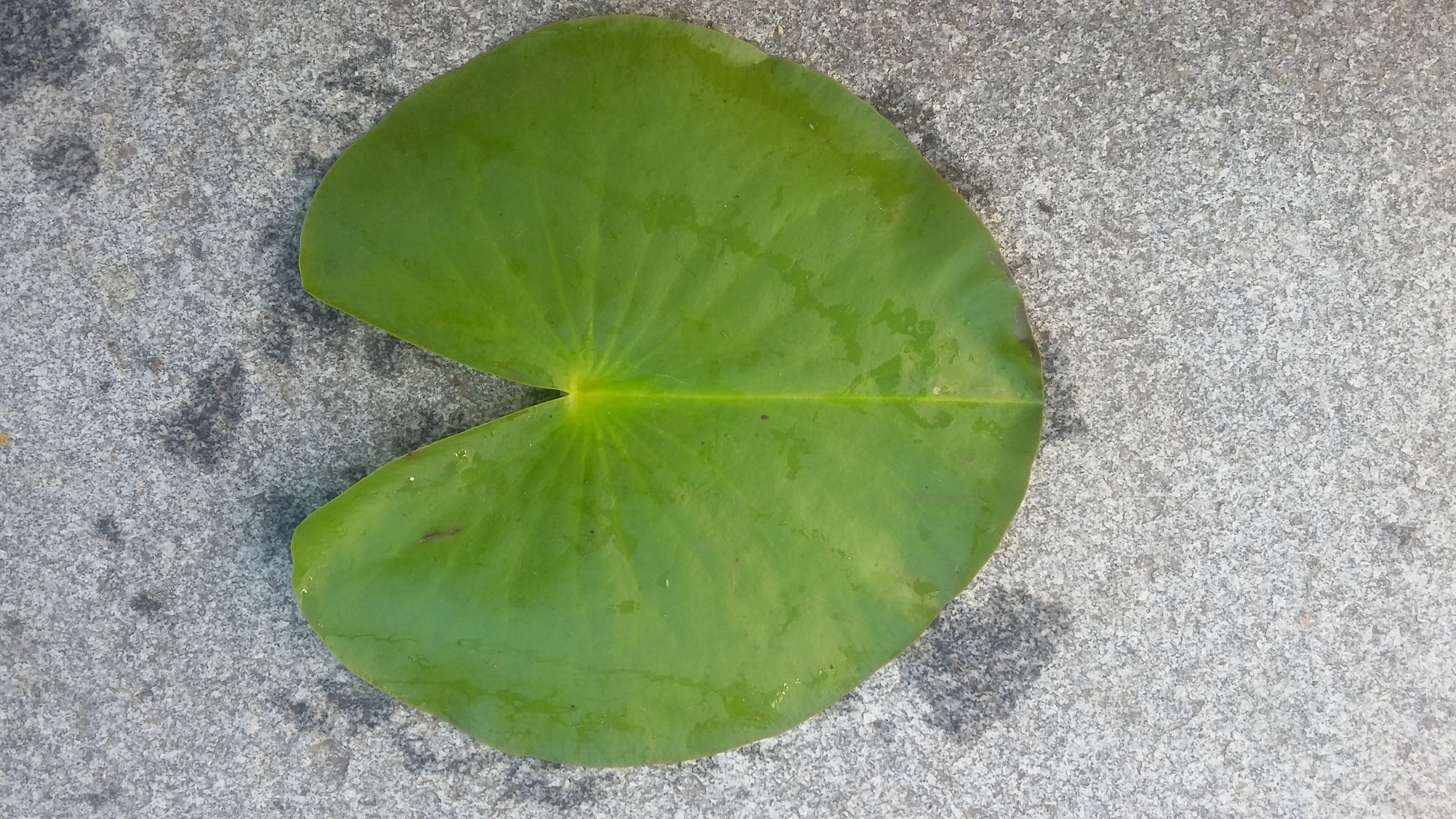
Adaxial leaf surface of Nymphaea odorata subsp. tuberosa
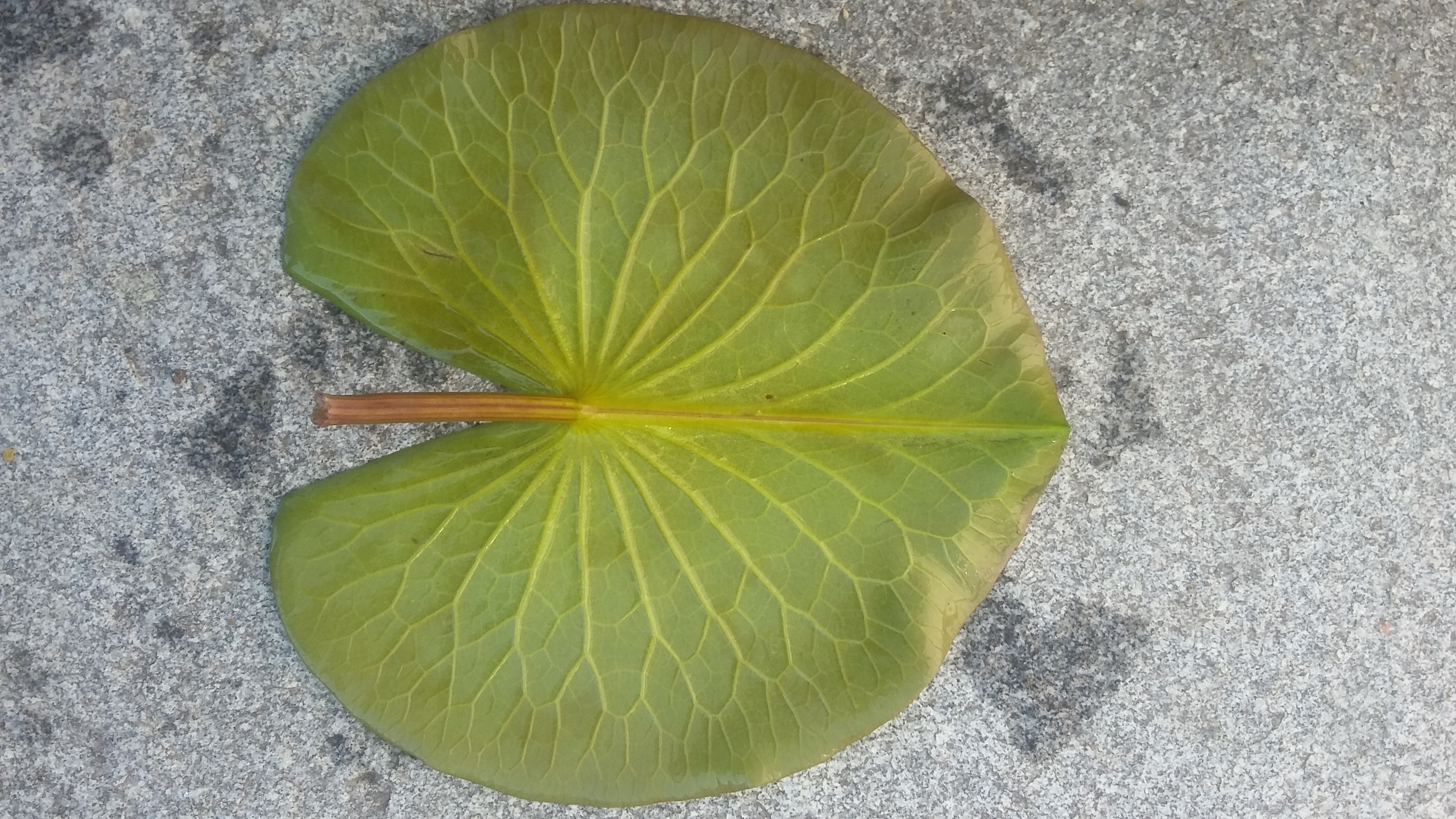
Abaxial leaf surface of Nymphaea odorata subsp. tuberosa

=== Vegetative characteristics ===
The rhizomes are branching.

=== Generative characteristics ===
The widest point of the filaments is below the middle.

== Taxonomy ==
It may be paraphyletic to Nymphaea sect. Chamaenymphaea.

=== Species ===
- Nymphaea alba L.
- Nymphaea alba subsp. occidentalis (Ostenf.) Hyl.
- Nymphaea × borealis E.G.Camus
- Nymphaea candida C.Presl
- Nymphaea odorata Aiton
- Nymphaea odorata subsp. tuberosa (Paine) Wiersema & Hellq.

== Distribution ==
Its species occur in North America and Europe.
