= Redtenbacheria =

Scientific classification
- Kingdom: Animalia
- Phylum: Arthropoda
- Clade: Pancrustacea
- Class: Insecta
- Order: Diptera
- Family: Tachinidae
- Subfamily: Dexiinae
- Tribe: Eutherini
- Genus: Redtenbacheria; Schiner, 1861

Type species
- Redtenbacheria spectabilis Egger, 1861

Genus of flies

Redtenbacheria is a genus of flies in the family Tachinidae.

== Species ==
- Redtenbacheria insignis Egger, 1861
