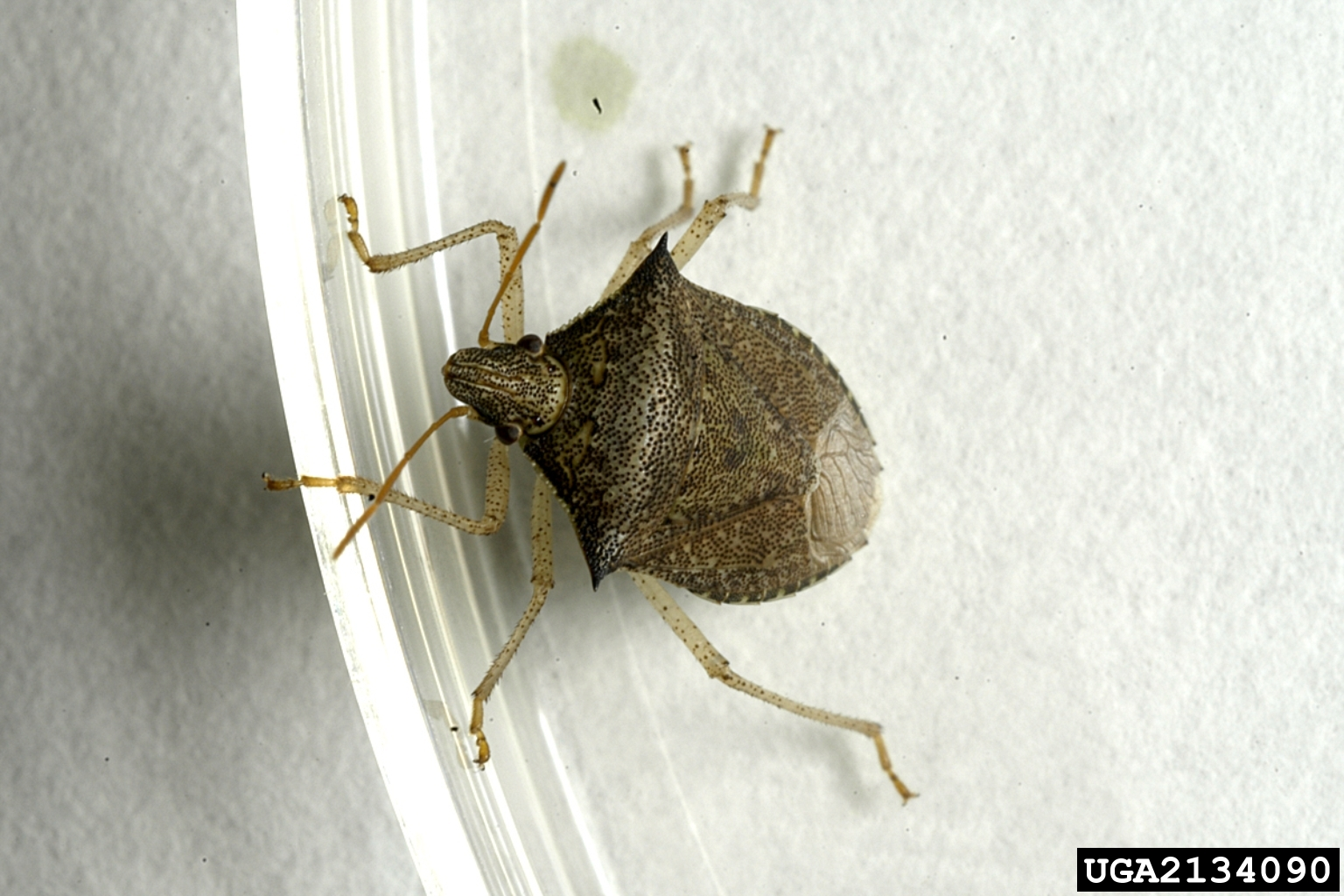

Scientific classification
- Domain: Eukaryota
- Kingdom: Animalia
- Phylum: Arthropoda
- Class: Insecta
- Order: Hemiptera
- Suborder: Heteroptera
- Family: Pentatomidae
- Genus: Euschistus
- Species: E. quadrator

Binomial name
- Euschistus quadrator Rolston, 1874

= Euschistus quadrator =

Species of true bug

Euschistus quadrator is a species in the family Pentatomidae ("stink bugs"), in the order Hemiptera ("true bugs, cicadas, hoppers, aphids and allies"). The distribution range of Euschistus quadrator includes Central America and North America.

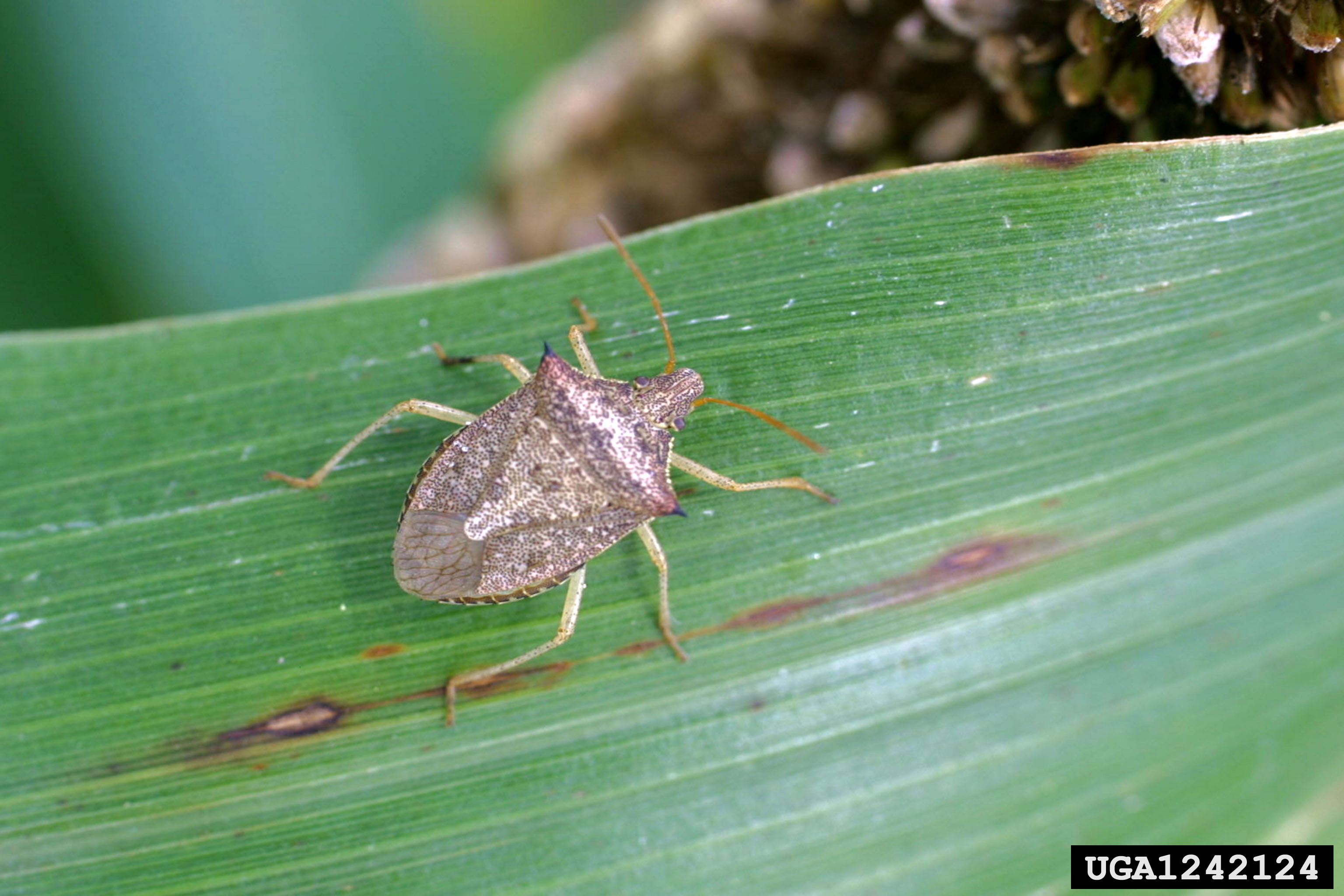
