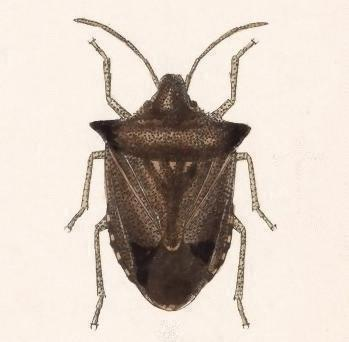
- Euschistus biformis

Scientific classification
- Domain: Eukaryota
- Kingdom: Animalia
- Phylum: Arthropoda
- Class: Insecta
- Order: Hemiptera
- Suborder: Heteroptera
- Family: Pentatomidae
- Tribe: Carpocorini
- Genus: Euschistus

= Euschistus =

Genus of true bugs

Euschistus is a genus of stink bugs in the family Pentatomidae. There are at least 20 described species in Euschistus.

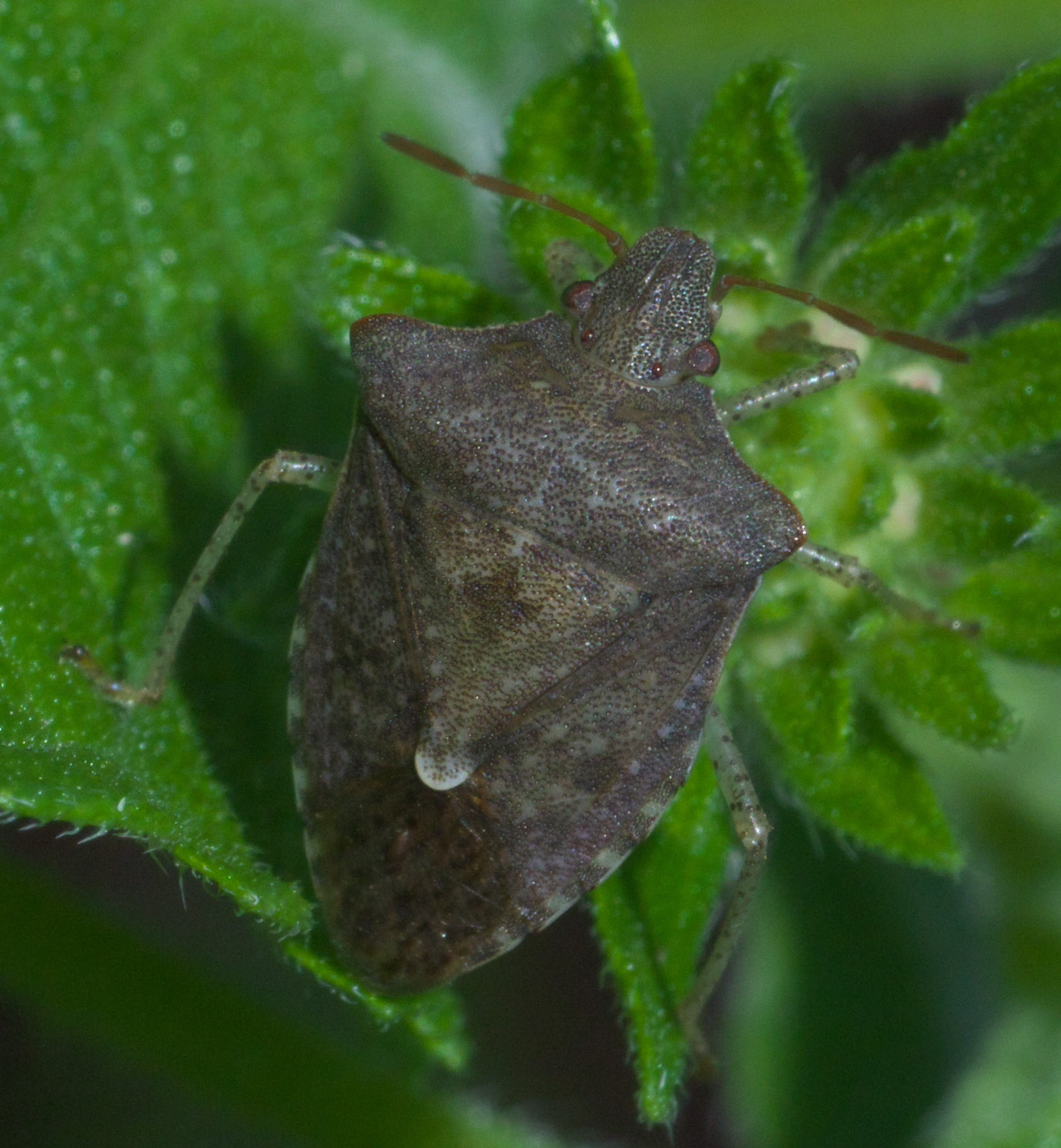
Euschistus tristigmus

== Species ==
- Euschistus acuminatus Walker, 1867
- Euschistus biformis Stål, 1862
- Euschistus comptus Walker, 1868
- Euschistus conspersus Uhler, 1897 – consperse stink bug
- Euschistus crassus Dallas, 1851
- Euschistus crenator (Fabricius, 1794)
- Euschistus eggelstoni Rolston, 1974
- Euschistus egglestoni Rolston, 1974
- Euschistus ictericus (Linnaeus, 1763)
- Euschistus inflatus Van Duzee, 1903
- Euschistus integer Stål, 1872
- Euschistus latimarginatus Zimmer, 1910
- Euschistus obscurus (Palisot, 1817) – pale-lined stink bug
- Euschistus politus Uhler, 1897
- Euschistus quadrator Rolston, 1874
- Euschistus servus (Say, 1832) – brown stink bug
- Euschistus spurculus Stål, 1862
- Euschistus strenuus Stål, 1862
- Euschistus tristigmus (Say, 1832) – dusky stink bug
- Euschistus variolarius (Palisot, 1817) – one-spotted stink bug
