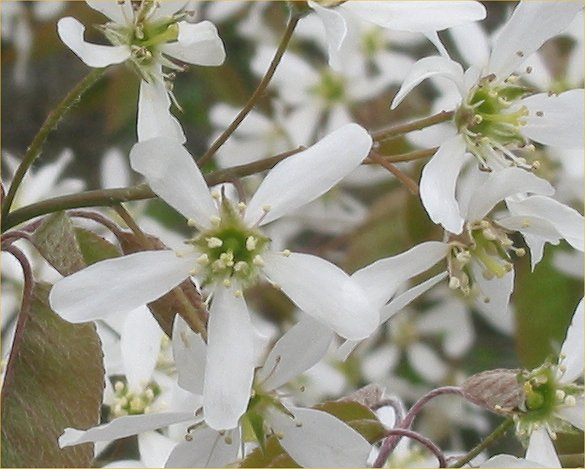

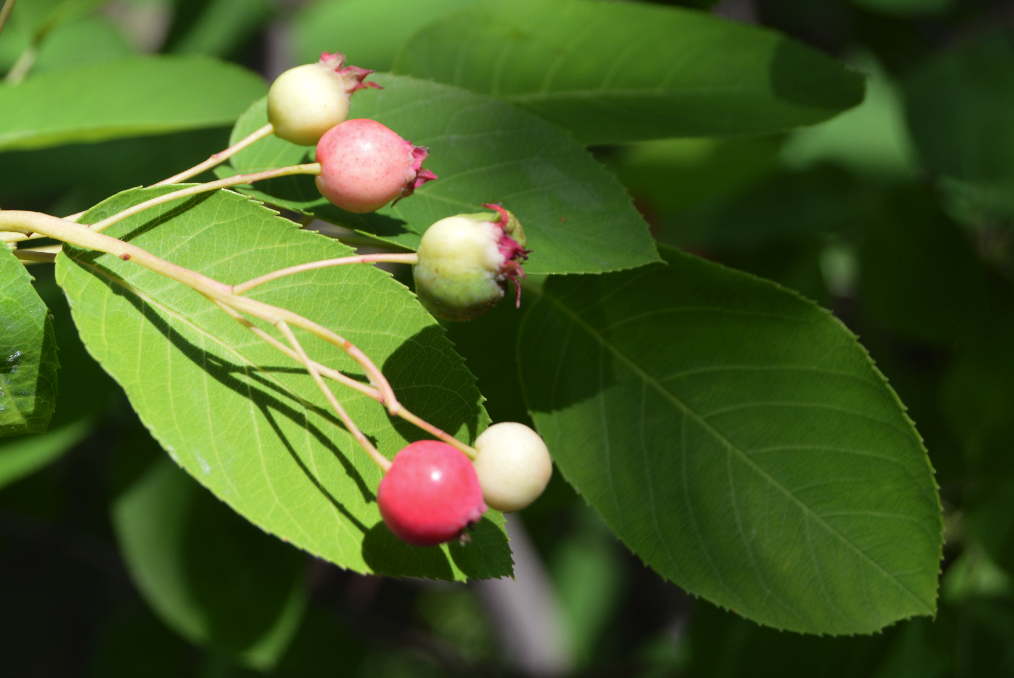

Conservation status
- Least Concern (IUCN 3.1)

- Secure (NatureServe)

Scientific classification
- Kingdom: Plantae
- Clade: Tracheophytes
- Clade: Angiosperms
- Clade: Eudicots
- Clade: Rosids
- Order: Rosales
- Family: Rosaceae
- Genus: Amelanchier
- Species: A. canadensis

Binomial name
- Amelanchier canadensis (L.) Medik.

Synonyms
- A. canadensis var. subintegra Fernald; A. confusa Hyl.; A. lucida Fernald; A. spicata Decne.; A. oblongifolia; Mespilus canadensis L. (basionym)

= Amelanchier canadensis =

Species of tree

Amelanchier canadensis (also known as Canadian serviceberry, thicket serviceberry, shad-blow serviceberry, shad-blow, shadbush serviceberry, shadbush, bilberry, juneberry, sarvis, sugarplum, currant-tree) is a species of Amelanchier native to eastern North America in Canada from Newfoundland west to southern Ontario, and in the United States from Maine south to Alabama. It is largely restricted to wet sites, particularly on the Atlantic coastal plain, growing at altitudes from sea level up to 200 m (660 ft).

== Description ==
It is a deciduous shrub or small tree growing to 0.5–8 metres (1.6–26.2 ft) tall with one to many stems and a narrow, fastigiate crown. The leaves are alternate, simple, ovate to ovate-oblong, 1–5.5 cm (0.39–2.17 in) long and 1.8–2.8 cm (0.71–1.10 in) broad with a rounded to sub-acute apex; they are downy below, and have a serrated margin and an 8–15 mm (0.31–0.59 in) petiole. The flowers are produced in early spring in loose racemes 4–6 cm (1.6–2.4 in) long at the ends of the branches; each raceme has four to ten flowers. The flower has five white petals 7.6–11 mm (0.30–0.43 in) long and 2–4 mm broad, and 20 stamens. The fruit is a pome, 7–10 mm (0.28–0.39 in) diameter, dark purple when ripe; it is edible and sweet. Fruits become ripe in June and July in its native range.

Amelanchier canadensis is a deciduous, small tree that flowers in the early spring. Its height ranges from 6 to 20 feet (1.8–6.1 m). The leaves are subtly serrated and about 1 1/2 to 2 1/2 inches (38–64 mm) in length and they have a simple alternate pattern.

=== Bark ===
The bark is smooth and ash gray color when it is younger but the bark begins to form long, dark ridges and shallow furrows as it grows older.

=== Fruit ===
The fruit is pome-like and is less than 1 inch (25 mm) in both width and length. As the fruit ages it turns from a green color to red to purple and finally to black as it reaches maturity. The fruits are a food source for many different species of birds and small mammals including cardinals, woodpeckers, robins, orioles, chipmunks, and squirrels.

=== Leaves ===
When leaves are young they are covered in fine hairs. They become glabrous as they become older but the underside of the leaf retains short hairs. The leaves are egg-shaped and have finely serrated margins. The leaves are arranged in a simple alternate pattern and are 1 to 3 inches (25–76 mm) long and less than 1 inch wide. Deer do not usually feed on this species.

=== Stems ===
Like the leaves, The stems are hairy when they are young and become glabrous over time. They have a brown or copper color. The buds also have fine hairs.

== Distribution ==
Amelanchier canadensis occurs primarily on the east coast of North America and it ranges as far north as the Ontario and Quebec provinces of Canada and as far west as Mississippi.

== Uses ==
It is used as a medicinal plant, food, and ornamental plant. It is sometimes made into bonsai. The serviceberry blooms early in the spring. it is an important food source for pollinators like butterflies and honeybees. The tree's wood is hard, heavy, and dark brown. It can hold polish and can be used to make fishing rods, walking sticks, and wooden handles. Wood production can be difficult due to the tree's small stature.

The bark and root of the tree have multiple medicinal purposes. The roots have been used for miscarriage, bark was used as a dewormer for children, was used to make disinfectant wipes, and could also be used to treat diarrhea and excessive bleeding while menstruating.

== Taxonomy ==
Amelanchier canadensis is part of the Rose family (Rosaceae). Its synonyms include A. canadensis var. subintegra, A. confusa Hyl., A. lucida, A. oblongifolia, and Mespilus canadensis L.. The plant was named by Friedrich Kasimir Medikus in 1793.

== Pests ==
Rust leaf spot blight and apple powdery mildew can occur on Amelanchier canadensis. Insects that can burden the tree include the sawfly, leaf miners, borers, and scales.

Gymnosporangium infecting leaves will begin to produce yellow circular marks. Once the fungus has matured, it begins to sprout spore horns that can be either yellow or brown. These horns can form on the fruit, leaves, stems, petioles, and twigs depending on the species of rust that has infected the tree. Leaves can begin to fall off, the fruits can start to rot, and it is not unusual for part of the tree infected with rust to die during the next winter. Members of the rose family are typically infected in wet weather during early spring. Chemical fungicides used should be applied after growth of the rust is noticed in the spring.

== Conservation ==
The species is classified as Vulnerable in Canadian provinces and Georgia, critically imperiled in Pennsylvania, and considered Secure in all other states within its native range.
