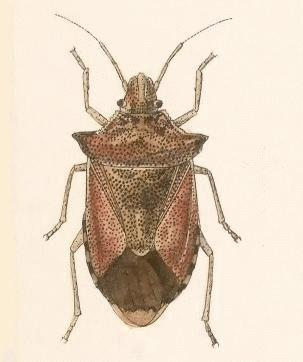

Scientific classification
- Kingdom: Animalia
- Phylum: Arthropoda
- Clade: Pancrustacea
- Class: Insecta
- Order: Hemiptera
- Suborder: Heteroptera
- Family: Pentatomidae
- Tribe: Carpocorini
- Genus: Euschistus
- Species: E. strenuus

Binomial name
- Euschistus strenuus Stål, 1862

= Euschistus strenuus =

Species of true bug

Euschistus strenuus is a species of stink bug in the family Pentatomidae. It is found in Central America and North America.
