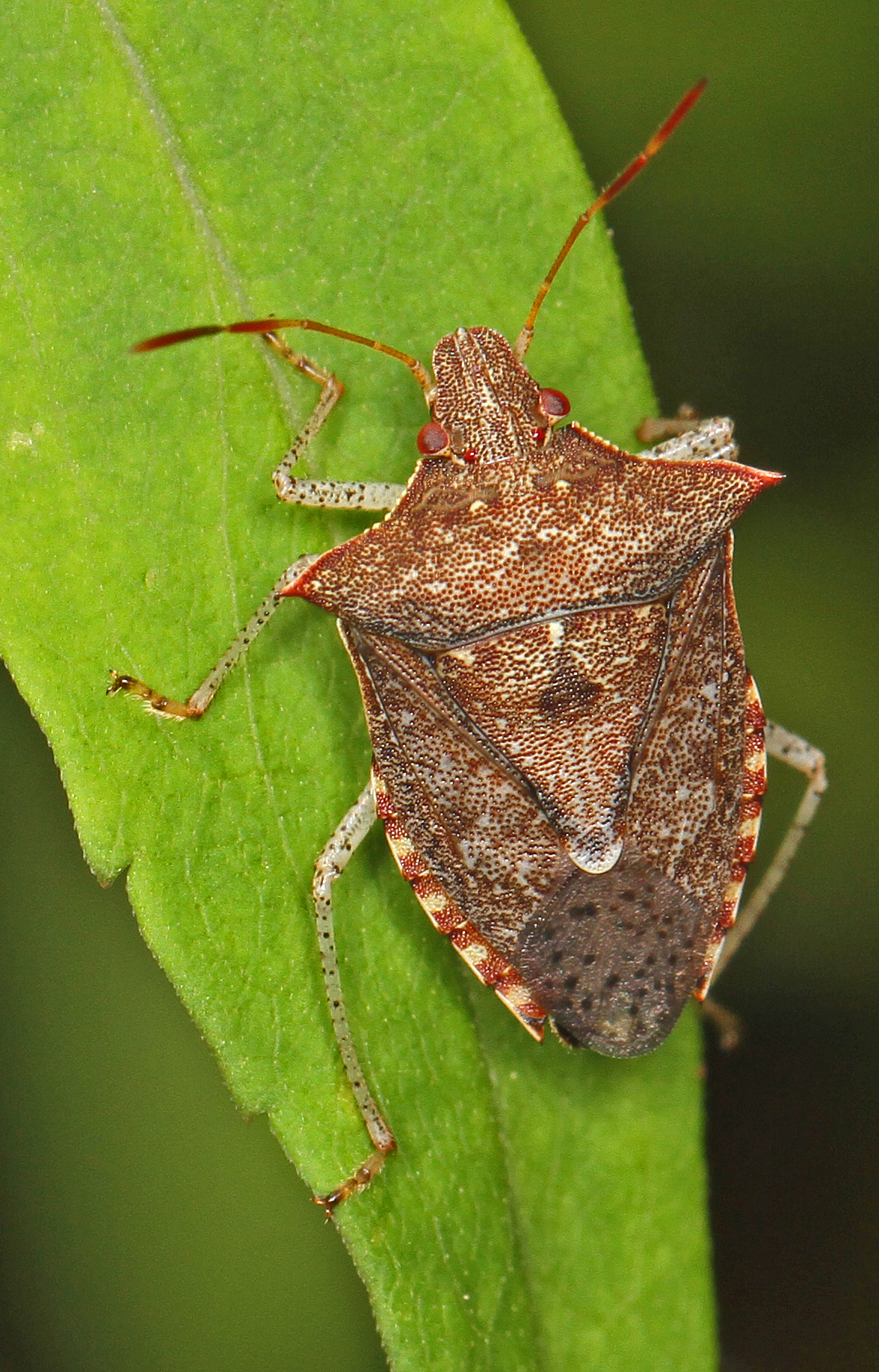

Scientific classification
- Domain: Eukaryota
- Kingdom: Animalia
- Phylum: Arthropoda
- Class: Insecta
- Order: Hemiptera
- Suborder: Heteroptera
- Family: Pentatomidae
- Genus: Euschistus
- Species: E. tristigmus

Binomial name
- Euschistus tristigmus (Say, 1832)

Synonyms
- Pentatoma tristigma Say, 1832

= Euschistus tristigmus =

Species of true bug

Euschistus tristigmus, the dusky stink bug, is a species of stink bug in the family Pentatomidae. It is found in Central America and North America.

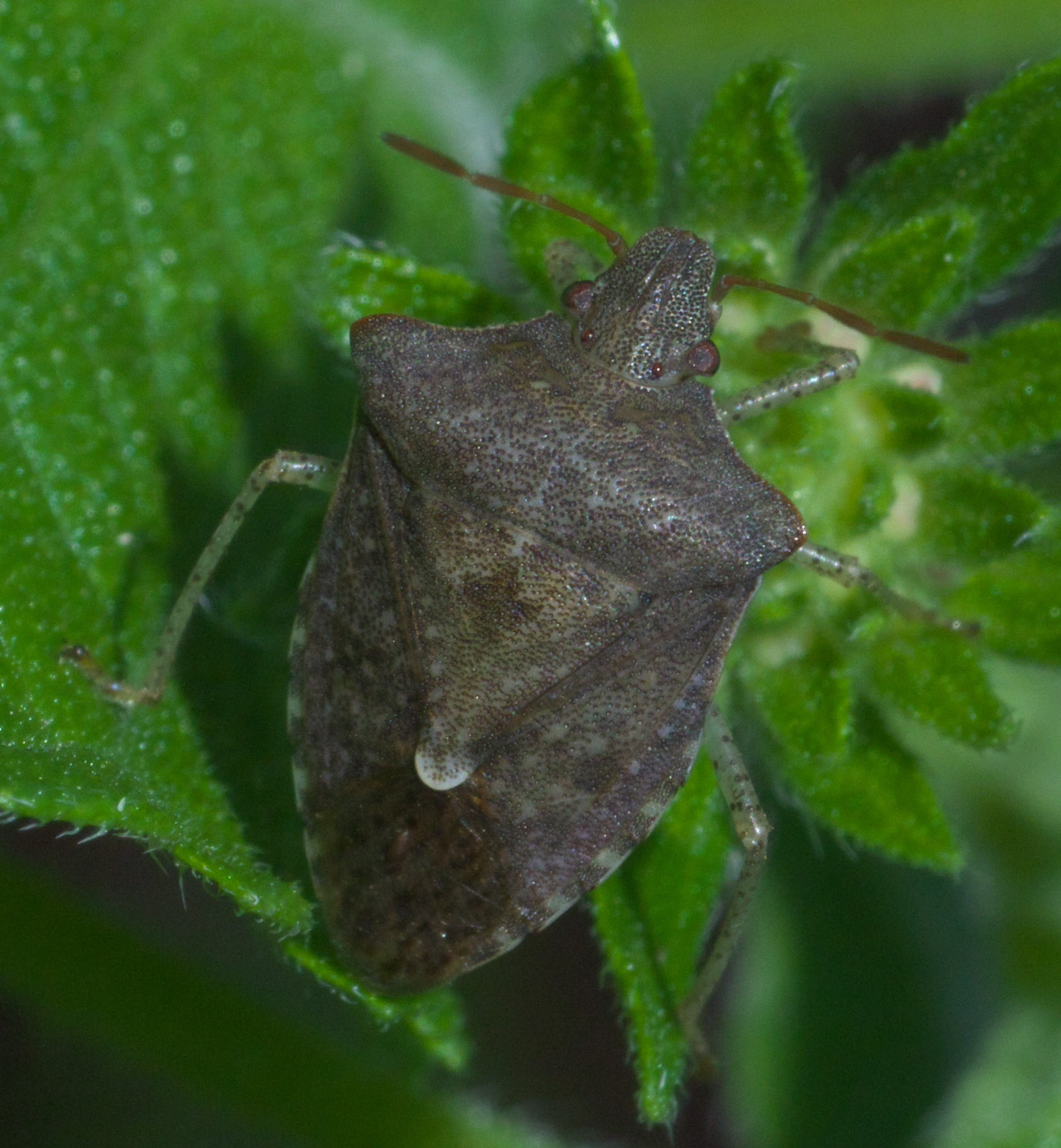
Dusky stink bug, Euschistus tristigmus

== Subspecies ==
There are two subspecies of Euschistus tristigmus:

- Euschistus tristigmus luridus Dallas, 1851^{i c g b} (dusky stink bug)
- Euschistus tristigmus tristigmus Say, 1832^{i c g b}

Data sources: i = ITIS, c = Catalogue of Life, g = GBIF, b = Bugguide.net
