= Euschistus crenator =

Scientific classification
- Domain: Eukaryota
- Kingdom: Animalia
- Phylum: Arthropoda
- Class: Insecta
- Order: Hemiptera
- Suborder: Heteroptera
- Family: Pentatomidae
- Genus: Euschistus
- Species: E. crenator

Binomial name
- Euschistus crenator (Fabricius, 1794)

Species of true bug

Euschistus crenator is a species of stink bug in the family Pentatomidae. It is found in the Caribbean Sea, Central America, North America, and South America.

== Subspecies ==
These two subspecies belong to the species Euschistus crenator:

- Euschistus crenator crenator (Fabricius, 1794)
- Euschistus crenator orbiculator Rolston, 1974
