= Redtenbacheria insignis =

Scientific classification
- Kingdom: Animalia
- Phylum: Arthropoda
- Clade: Pancrustacea
- Class: Insecta
- Order: Diptera
- Family: Tachinidae
- Subfamily: Dexiinae
- Tribe: Eutherini
- Genus: Redtenbacheria
- Species: R. insignis

Binomial name
- Redtenbacheria insignis Egger, 1861

Synonyms
- Redtenbacheria spectabilis Schiner, 1861

Species of fly

Redtenbacheria insignis is a European species of fly in the family Tachinidae. It is the type species of the genus Redtenbacheria.

== Distribution ==
Uzbekistan, China, British Isles, Czech Republic, Hungary, Lithuania, Poland, Ukraine, Denmark, Sweden, Bulgaria, Italy, Serbia, Slovenia, Austria, France, Germany, Switzerland, Japan, Russia, Transcaucasia.
