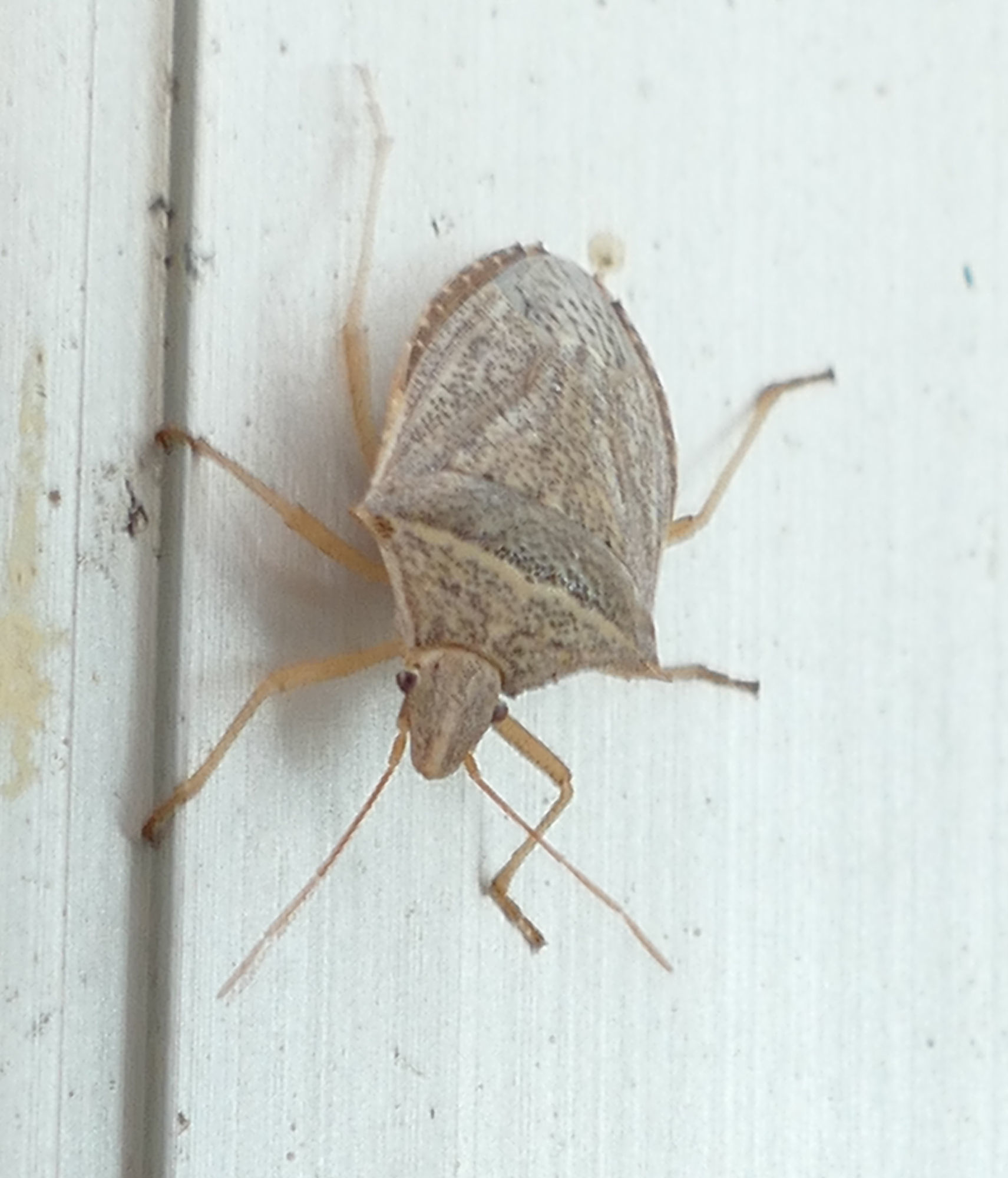

Scientific classification
- Domain: Eukaryota
- Kingdom: Animalia
- Phylum: Arthropoda
- Class: Insecta
- Order: Hemiptera
- Suborder: Heteroptera
- Family: Pentatomidae
- Tribe: Carpocorini
- Genus: Euschistus
- Species: E. crassus

Binomial name
- Euschistus crassus Dallas, 1851

= Euschistus crassus =

Species of true bug

Euschistus crassus is a species of stink bug in the family Pentatomidae. It is found in the Caribbean Sea and North America.
