= Euschistus conspersus =

Scientific classification
- Kingdom: Animalia
- Phylum: Arthropoda
- Class: Insecta
- Order: Hemiptera
- Suborder: Heteroptera
- Family: Pentatomidae
- Tribe: Carpocorini
- Genus: Euschistus
- Species: E. conspersus

Binomial name
- Euschistus conspersus Uhler, 1897

Species of true bug

Euschistus conspersus, the consperse stink bug, is a species of stink bug in the family Pentatomidae. It is found in North America.
