= Afzelin =

Names
- IUPAC name 4′,5,7-Trihydroxy-3-(α-D-rhamnopyranosyloxy)flavone
- Systematic IUPAC name 5,7-Dihydroxy-2-(4-hydroxyphenyl)-3-{[(2S,3R,4R,5R,6S)-3,4,5-trihydroxy-6-methyloxan-2-yl]oxy}-4H-1-benzopyran-4-one
- Other names Kaempferol 3-rhamnoside Kaempferol 3-O-rhamnoside; Kaempferin

Identifiers
CAS Number	482-39-3
3D model (JSmol)	Interactive image
ChEBI	CHEBI:80790
ChemSpider	4475671
KEGG	C16911
PubChem CID	5316673
UNII	5M86W1YH7O
CompTox Dashboard (EPA)	DTXSID50197459
- InChI: InChI=1S/C21H20O10/c1-8-15(25)17(27)18(28)21(29-8)31-20-16(26)14-12(24)6-11(23)7-13(14)30-19(20)9-2-4-10(22)5-3-9/h2-8,15,17-18,21-25,27-28H,1H3/t8-,15-,17+,18+,21-/m0/s1 Key: SOSLMHZOJATCCP-AEIZVZFYSA-N
- SMILES: OC(C=C1)=CC=C1C2=C(O[C@@H]3O[C@@H](C)[C@H](O)[C@@H](O)[C@H]3O)C(C4=C(O)C=C(O)C=C4O2)=O

Properties
Chemical formula	C_{21}H_{20}O_{10}
Molar mass	432.381 g·mol^{−1}
- Except where otherwise noted, data are given for materials in their standard state (at 25 °C [77 °F], 100 kPa). Infobox references

Afzelin is a flavonol glycoside. It is the rhamnoside of kaempferol. It is found in Nymphaea odorata.
