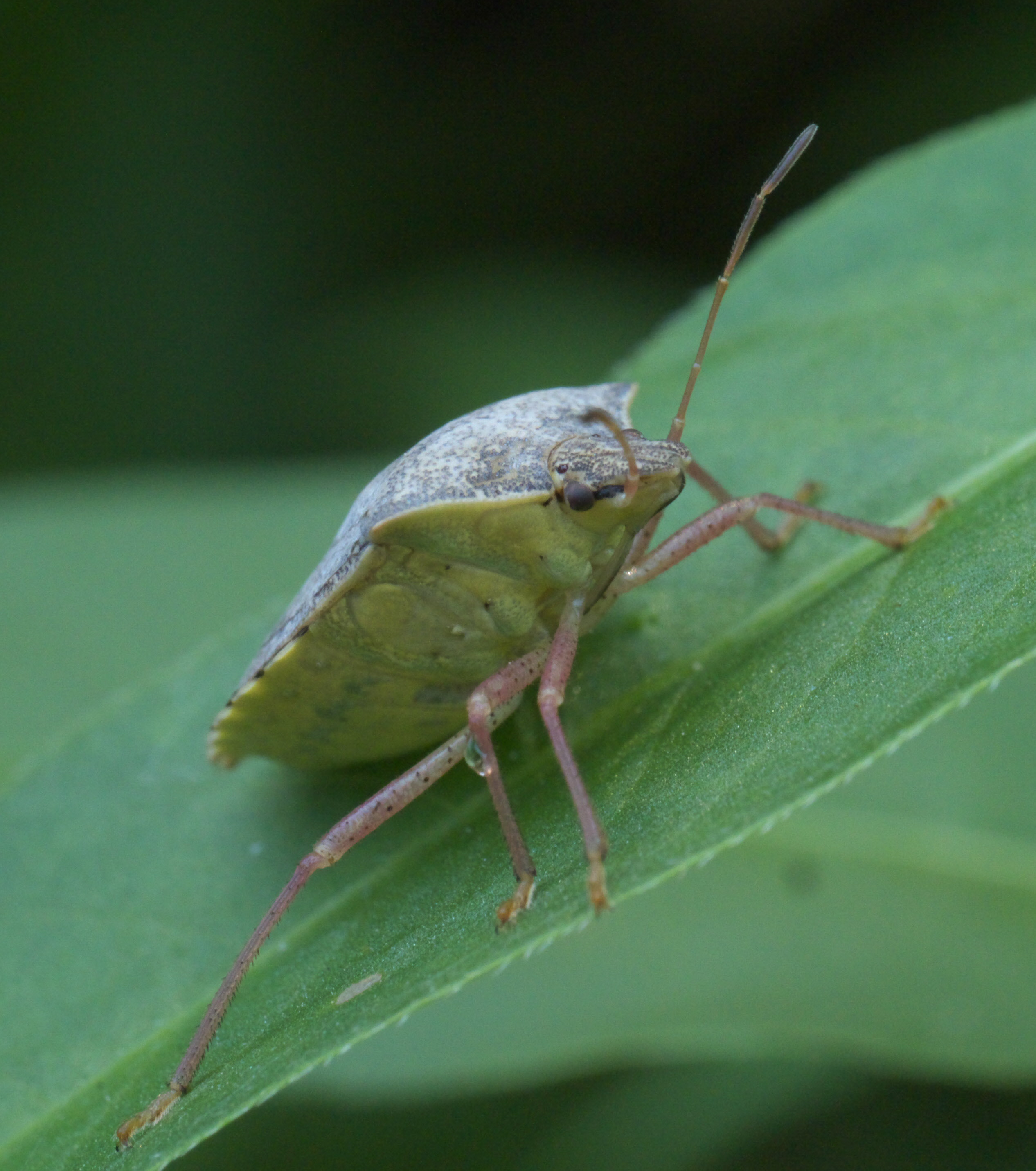

Scientific classification
- Domain: Eukaryota
- Kingdom: Animalia
- Phylum: Arthropoda
- Class: Insecta
- Order: Hemiptera
- Suborder: Heteroptera
- Family: Pentatomidae
- Genus: Euschistus
- Species: E. servus

Binomial name
- Euschistus servus (Say, 1832)

= Euschistus servus =

Species of true bug

Euschistus servus, the brown stink bug, is a species of stink bug in the family Pentatomidae. It is found in Central America and North America.

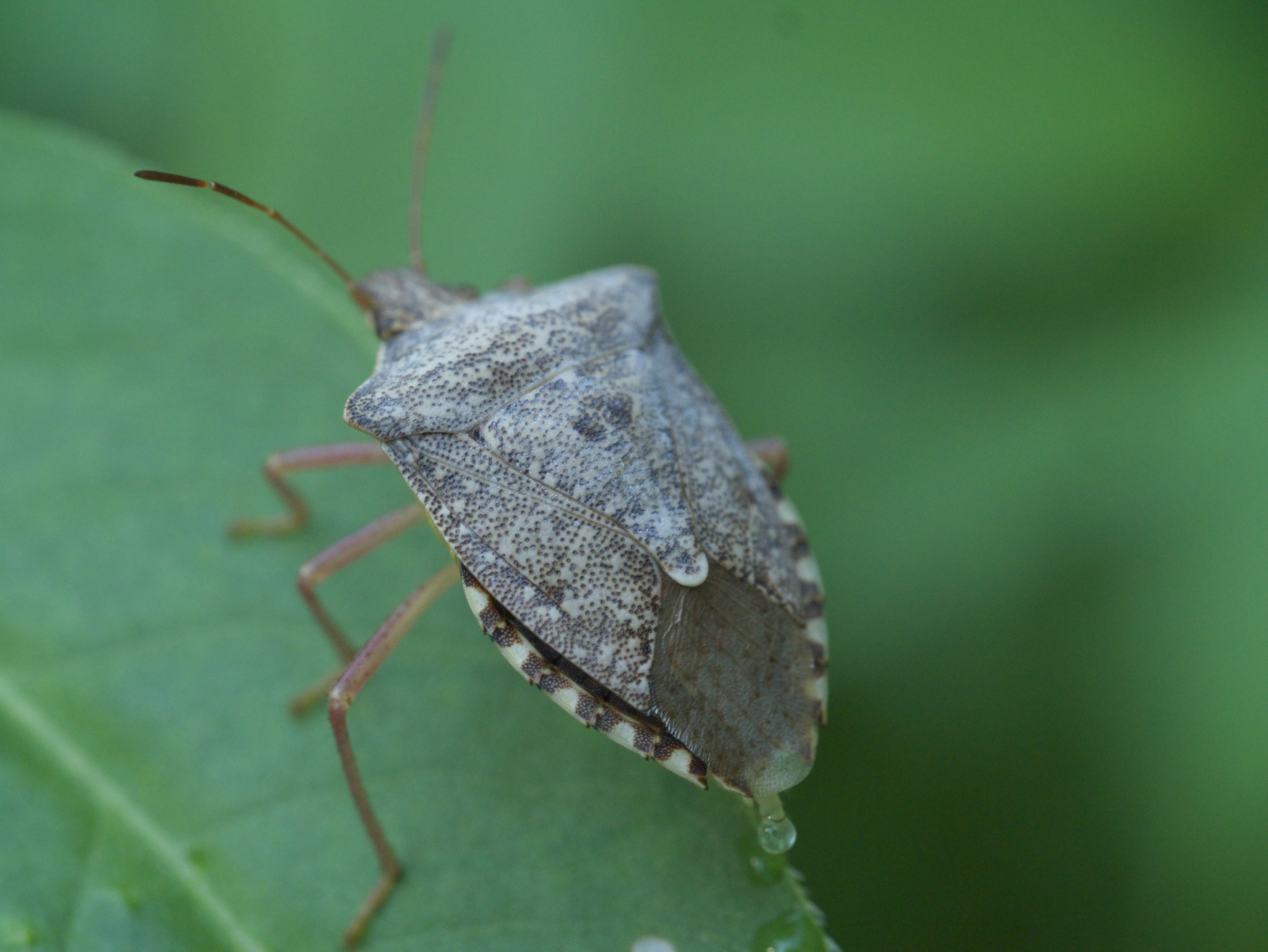
Brown stink bug, Euschistus servus

== Subspecies ==
These two subspecies belong to the species Euschistus servus:

- Euschistus servus euschistoides (Vollenhoven, 1868) (brown stink bug)
- Euschistus servus servus (Say, 1832)
