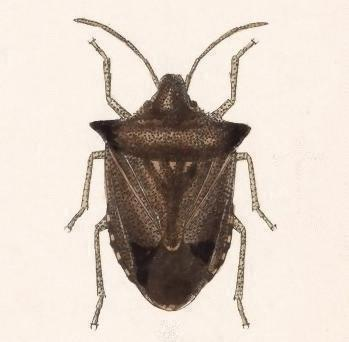

Scientific classification
- Kingdom: Animalia
- Phylum: Arthropoda
- Clade: Pancrustacea
- Class: Insecta
- Order: Hemiptera
- Suborder: Heteroptera
- Family: Pentatomidae
- Genus: Euschistus
- Species: E. biformis

Binomial name
- Euschistus biformis Stål 1862

= Euschistus biformis =

Species of true bug

Euschistus biformis is a species in the family Pentatomidae ("stink bugs"), in the order Hemiptera ("true bugs, cicadas, hoppers, aphids and allies"). The distribution range of Euschistus biformis includes Central America and North America.
