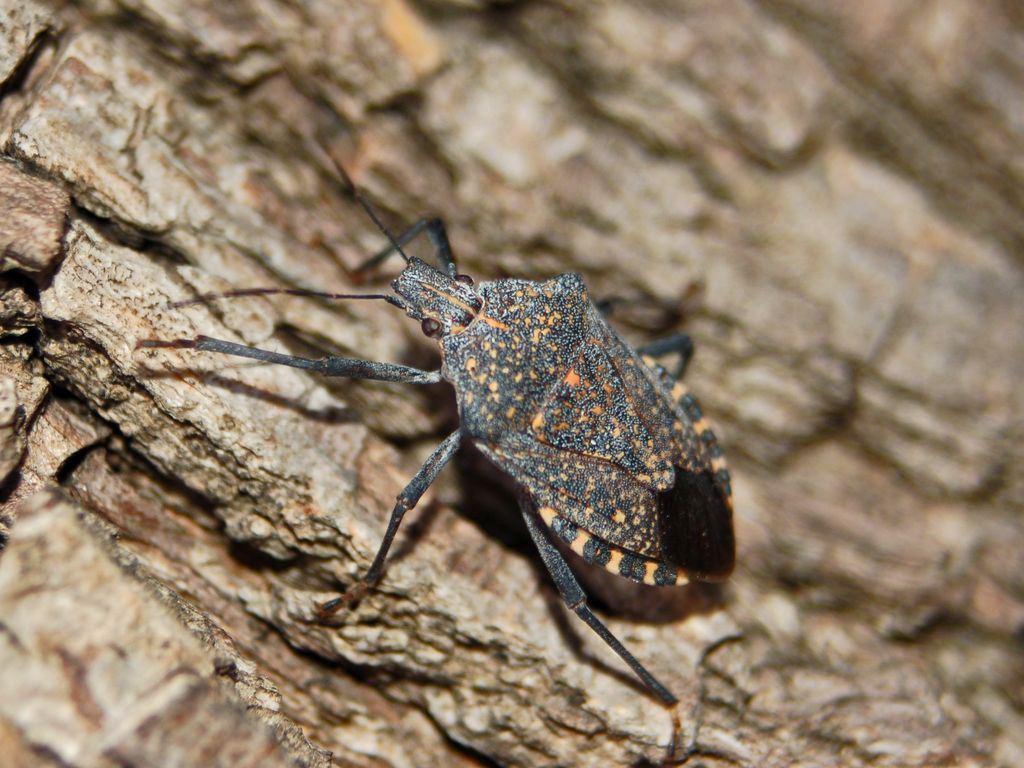
- Apodiphus amygdali

Scientific classification
- Kingdom: Animalia
- Phylum: Arthropoda
- Clade: Pancrustacea
- Class: Insecta
- Order: Hemiptera
- Suborder: Heteroptera
- Family: Pentatomidae
- Subfamily: Pentatominae
- Genus: Apodiphus; Spinola, 1837

= Apodiphus =

Genus of true bugs

Apodiphus is a genus of Palaearctic shield bugs belonging to the family Pentatomidae, subfamily Pentatominae.

== Species ==
- Apodiphus amygdali (Germar, 1817)
- Apodiphus integriceps Horváth, 1888
- Apodiphus murgbzarus Ghauri
- Apodiphus pallidus (Hoberlandt, 1959)
