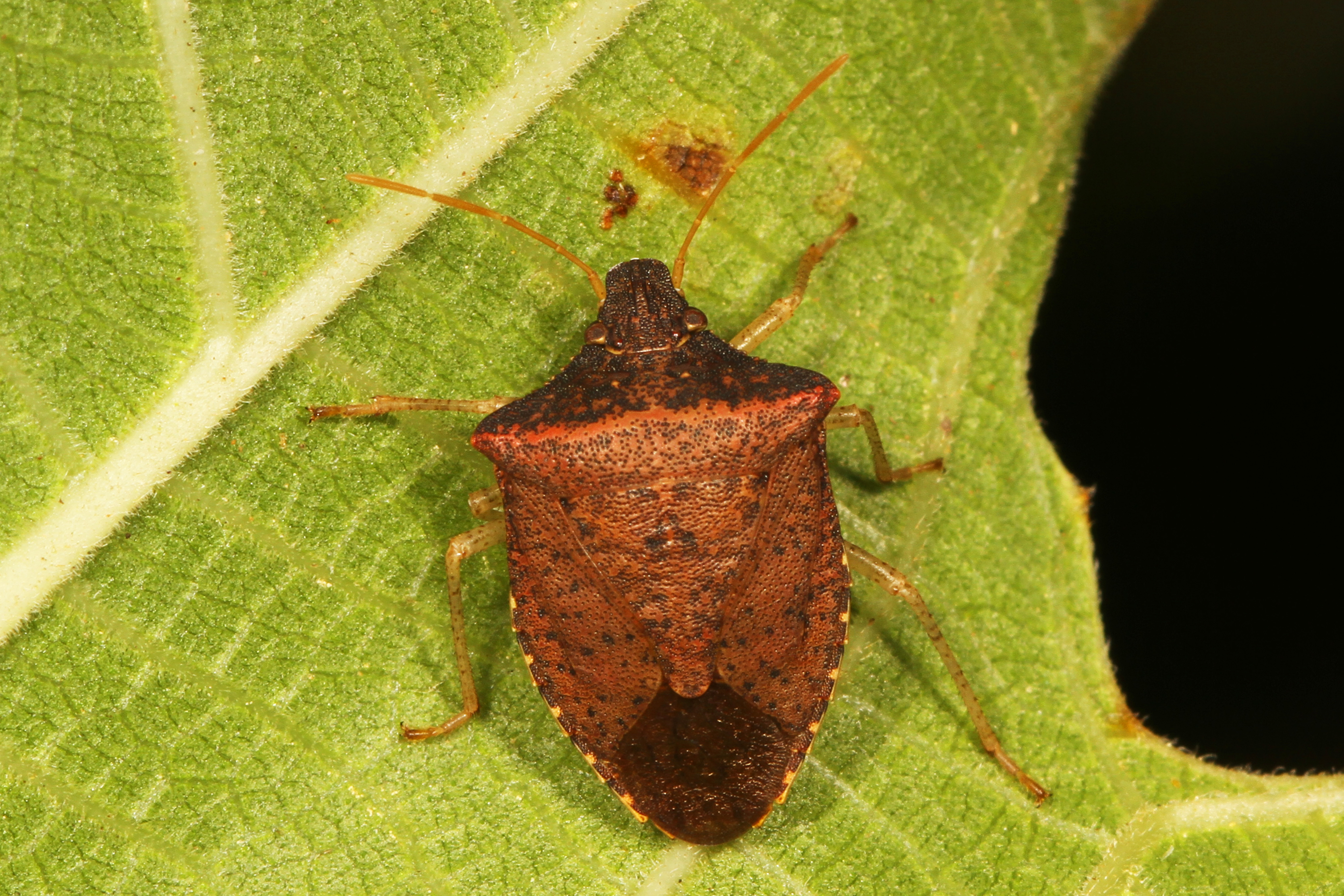

Scientific classification
- Domain: Eukaryota
- Kingdom: Animalia
- Phylum: Arthropoda
- Class: Insecta
- Order: Hemiptera
- Suborder: Heteroptera
- Family: Pentatomidae
- Tribe: Carpocorini
- Genus: Euschistus
- Species: E. obscurus

Binomial name
- Euschistus obscurus (Palisot, 1817)

= Euschistus obscurus =

Species of true bug

Euschistus obscurus, the pale-lined stink bug, is a species of stink bug in the family Pentatomidae. It is found in the Caribbean, Central America, and North America.
