= Euthera =

Scientific classification
- Kingdom: Animalia
- Phylum: Arthropoda
- Class: Insecta
- Order: Diptera
- Family: Tachinidae
- Subfamily: Dexiinae
- Tribe: Eutherini
- Genus: Euthera; Loew, 1866

Type species
- Euthera tentatrix Loew, 1866

Synonyms
- Eutheropsis Townsend, 1916; Macreuthera Bezzi, 1925; Preuthera Townsend, 1933

Genus of flies

Euthera is a genus of flies in the family Tachinidae.

== Species ==
- Euthera barbiellinii Bezzi, 1925
- Euthera bicolor Coquillett, 1902
- Euthera fascipennis (Loew, 1854)
- Euthera illungnarra Cantrell, 1983
- Euthera lata Cantrell, 1983
- Euthera peringueyi Bezzi, 1925
- Euthera rieki Paramonov, 1953
- Euthera setifacies Brooks, 1945
- Euthera setula Cantrell, 1983
- Euthera skusei Bezzi, 1925
- Euthera tentatrix Loew, 1866
- Euthera tuckeri Bezzi, 1925
- Euthera woodi O'Hara, 2012
