= Euschistus politus =

Scientific classification
- Kingdom: Animalia
- Phylum: Arthropoda
- Clade: Pancrustacea
- Class: Insecta
- Order: Hemiptera
- Suborder: Heteroptera
- Family: Pentatomidae
- Tribe: Carpocorini
- Genus: Euschistus
- Species: E. politus

Binomial name
- Euschistus politus Uhler, 1897

Species of true bug

Euschistus politus is a species of stink bug in the family Pentatomidae. It is found in North America.
