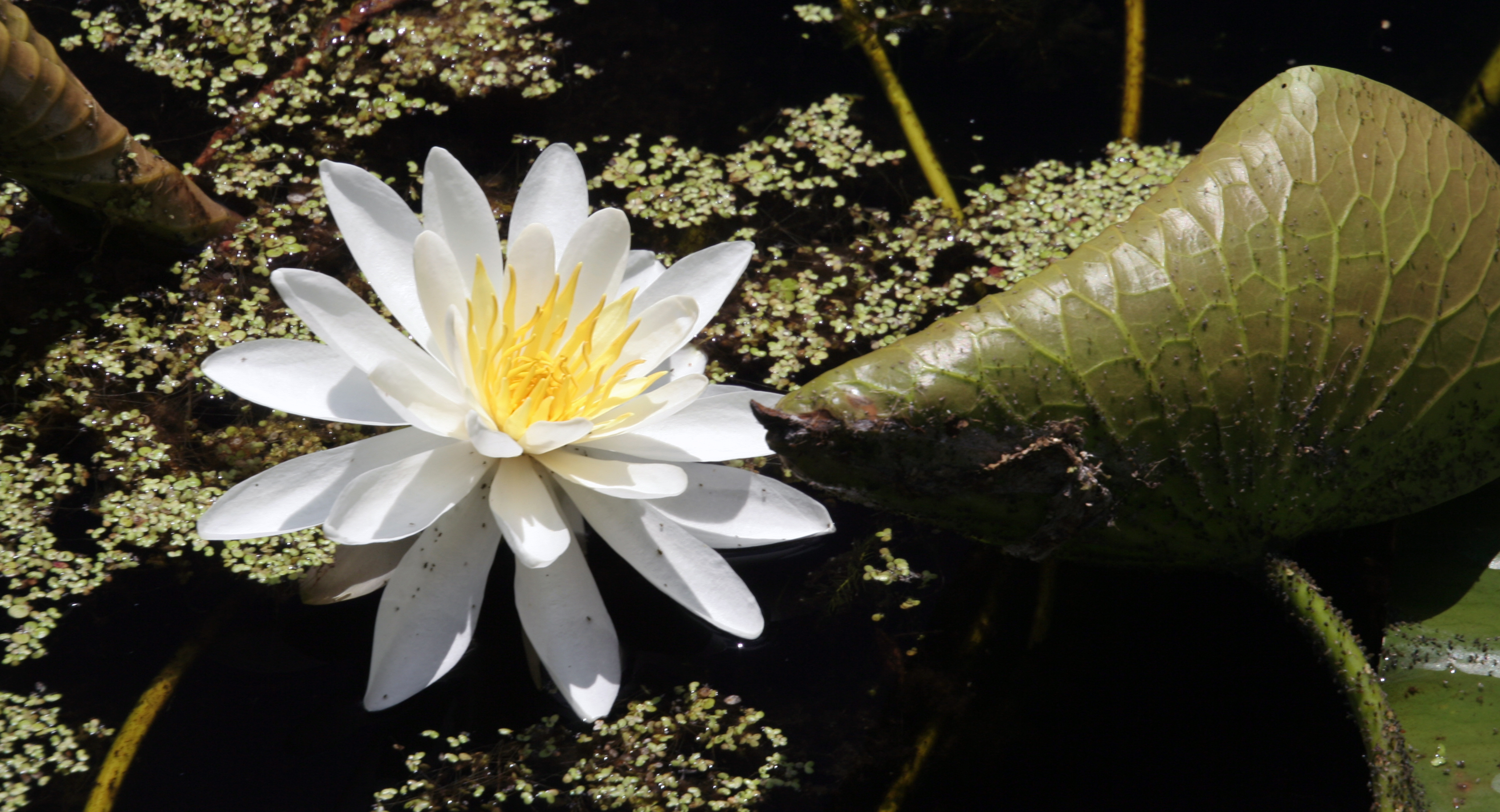

Scientific classification
- Kingdom: Plantae
- Clade: Tracheophytes
- Clade: Angiosperms
- Order: Nymphaeales
- Family: Nymphaeaceae
- Genus: Nymphaea
- Species: N. odorata
- Subspecies: N. o. subsp. tuberosa

Trinomial name
- Nymphaea odorata subsp. tuberosa (Paine) Wiersma & Hellq.
- Nymphaea odorata subsp. tuberosa is endemic to Canada and the USA

Synonyms
- List: Castalia tuberosa (Paine) Greene; Leuconymphaea tuberosa (Paine) Kuntze; Nymphaea tuberosa Paine; Castalia spiralis (Raf.) Cockerell; Nymphaea maculata Raf.; Nymphaea odorata var. maxima (Conard ex L.H.Bailey) B.Boivin; Nymphaea spiralis Raf.; Nymphaea tuberosa var. maxima Conard ex L.H.Bailey

= Nymphaea odorata subsp. tuberosa =

Species of plant

Nymphaea odorata subsp. tuberosa is a subspecies of Nymphaea odorata native to the region spanning from Central and Eastern Canada, extending to North Central and Northeastern United States.

== Description ==
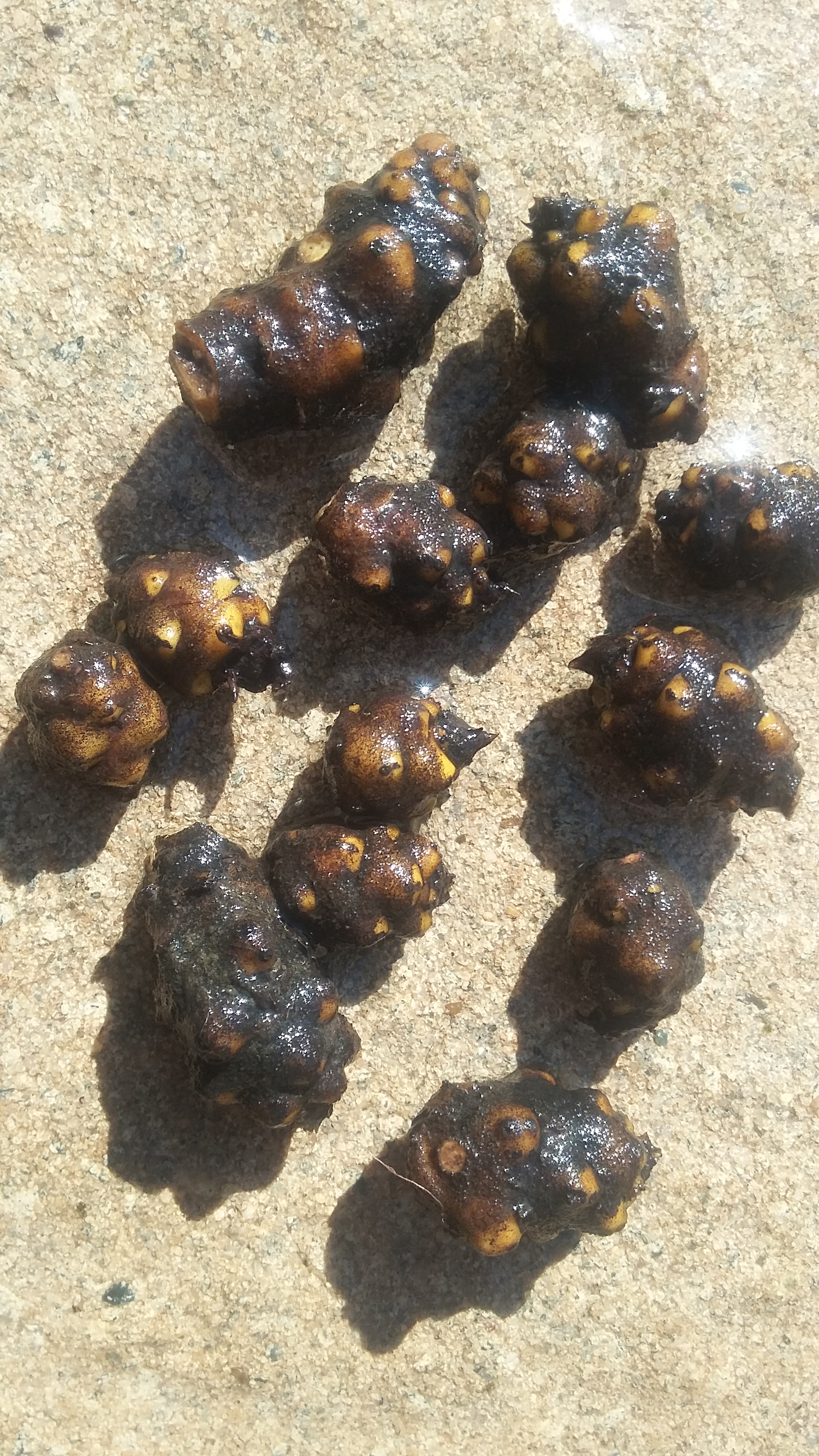
Rhizomes of Nymphaea odorata subsp. tuberosa
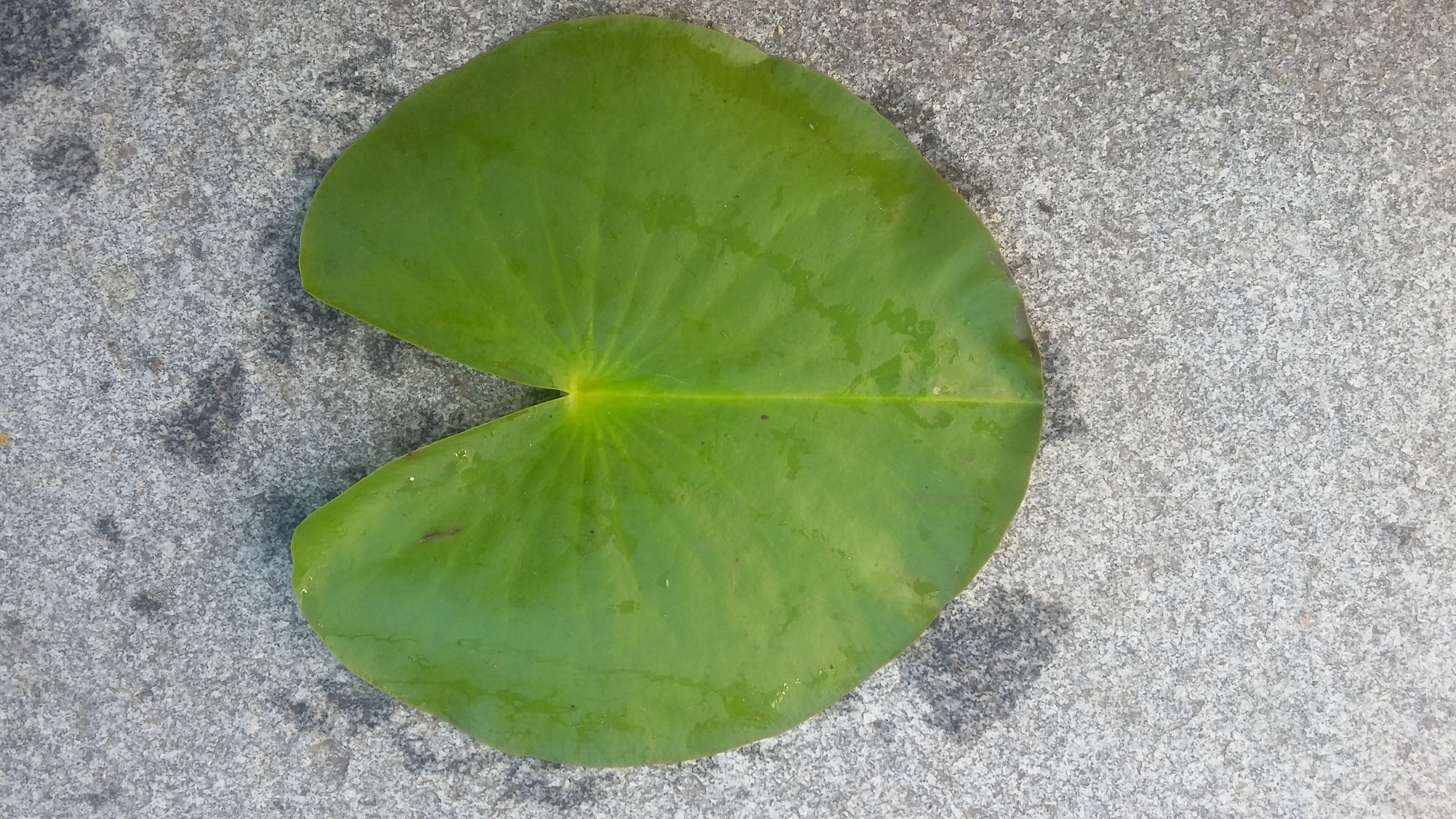
Adaxial leaf surface of Nymphaea odorata subsp. tuberosa
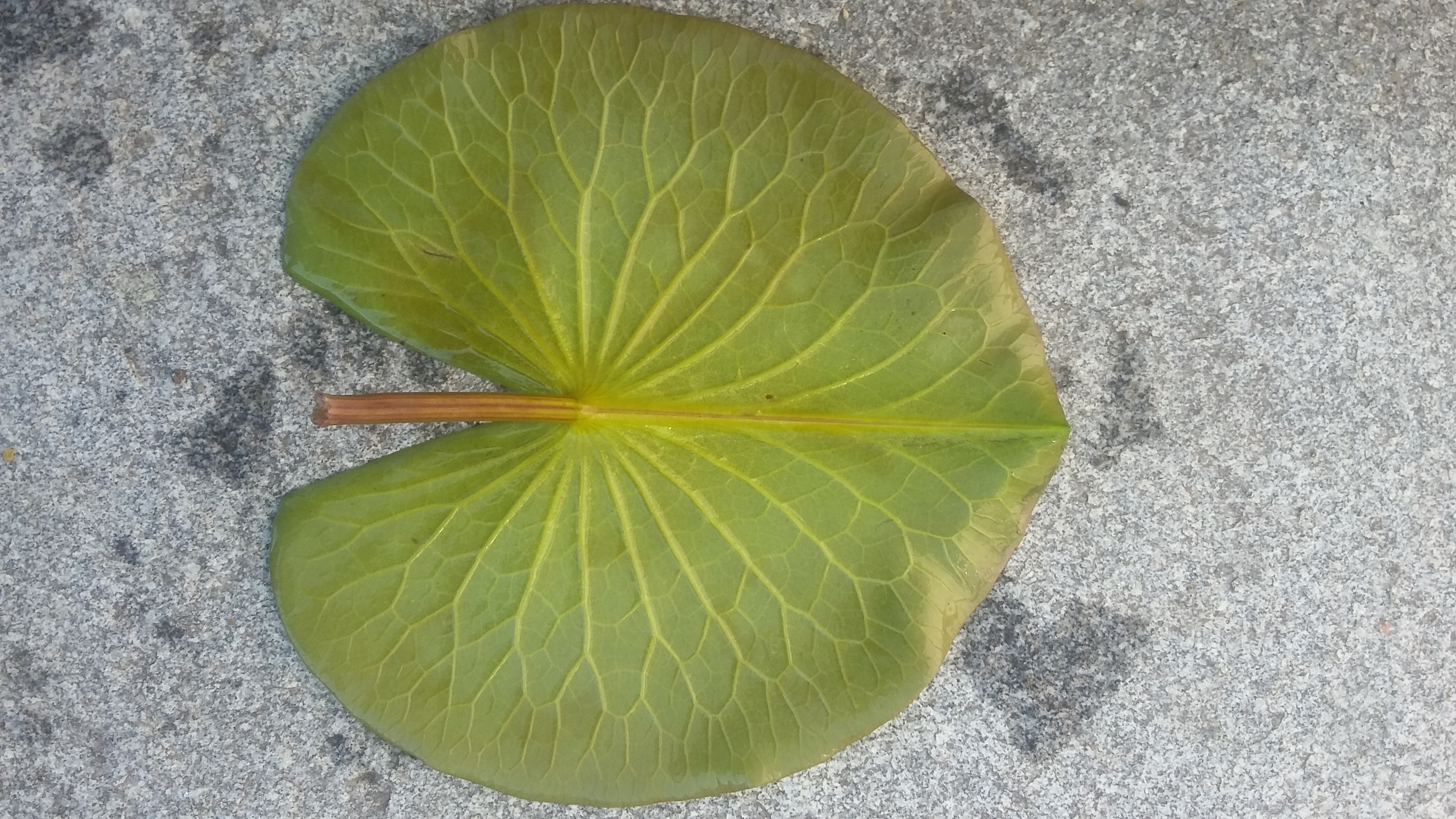
Abaxial leaf surface of Nymphaea odorata subsp. tuberosa

=== Vegetative characteristics ===
Nymphaea odorata subsp. tuberosa has horizontal, tuberous, branched, 30-80 cm long, and 2-5 cm wide rhizomes. The leaves of mature plants float on the water, or extend 2-7 cm above the surface. The petiolate, orbicular leaves are 12-38 cm wide. The abaxial leaf surface is green or slightly purple. The petiole has brown to purple stripes. It has four primary central, and twelve secondary peripheral air canals.

=== Generative characteristics ===
The 10-23 cm wide flowers emerge 10-15 cm above the water surface. They have green, terete, 30-200 cm long, and 0.5-0.9 cm wide peduncles. The peduncles have red to brown stripes. The flowers have four sepals with a rounded apex. The white, obovate to spatulate petals have a rounded apex. The gynoecium consists of 14 carpels. The globose, 2.2 cm long, and 3.2 cm wide fruit bears 2.8-4.5 mm long seeds. The flowers are inodorous, or only very faintly fragrant.

== Cytology ==
The haploid chromosome count is n = 42.

== Reproduction ==
=== Vegetative reproduction ===
It can reproduce vegetatively by detached rhizomes.

=== Generative reproduction ===
Flowering occurs in late spring to summer. Fruiting occurs from July to October.

== Taxonomy ==
=== Publication ===
It was described as Nymphaea tuberosa Paine by John Alsop Paine in 1865. Later, it was included in the species Nymphaea odorata Aiton as the subspecies Nymphaea odorata subsp. tuberosa (Paine) Wiersema & Hellq. published by John Harry Wiersema & Carl Barre Hellquist in 1994.

=== Type specimen ===
The lectotype was collected by J.A.Paine in Lake Ontario, near Rochester, USA in Aug 1865.

=== Position with in Nymphaea ===
It is placed in Nymphaea subg. Nymphaea.

== Etymology ==
The subspecific epithet tuberosa, from the Latin tuberosus, means tuberous, or having a tuber.

== Ecology ==
=== Habitat ===
It occurs in streams, rivers, ponds, and lakes.

== Use ==
=== Food ===
The rhizomes are edible.
