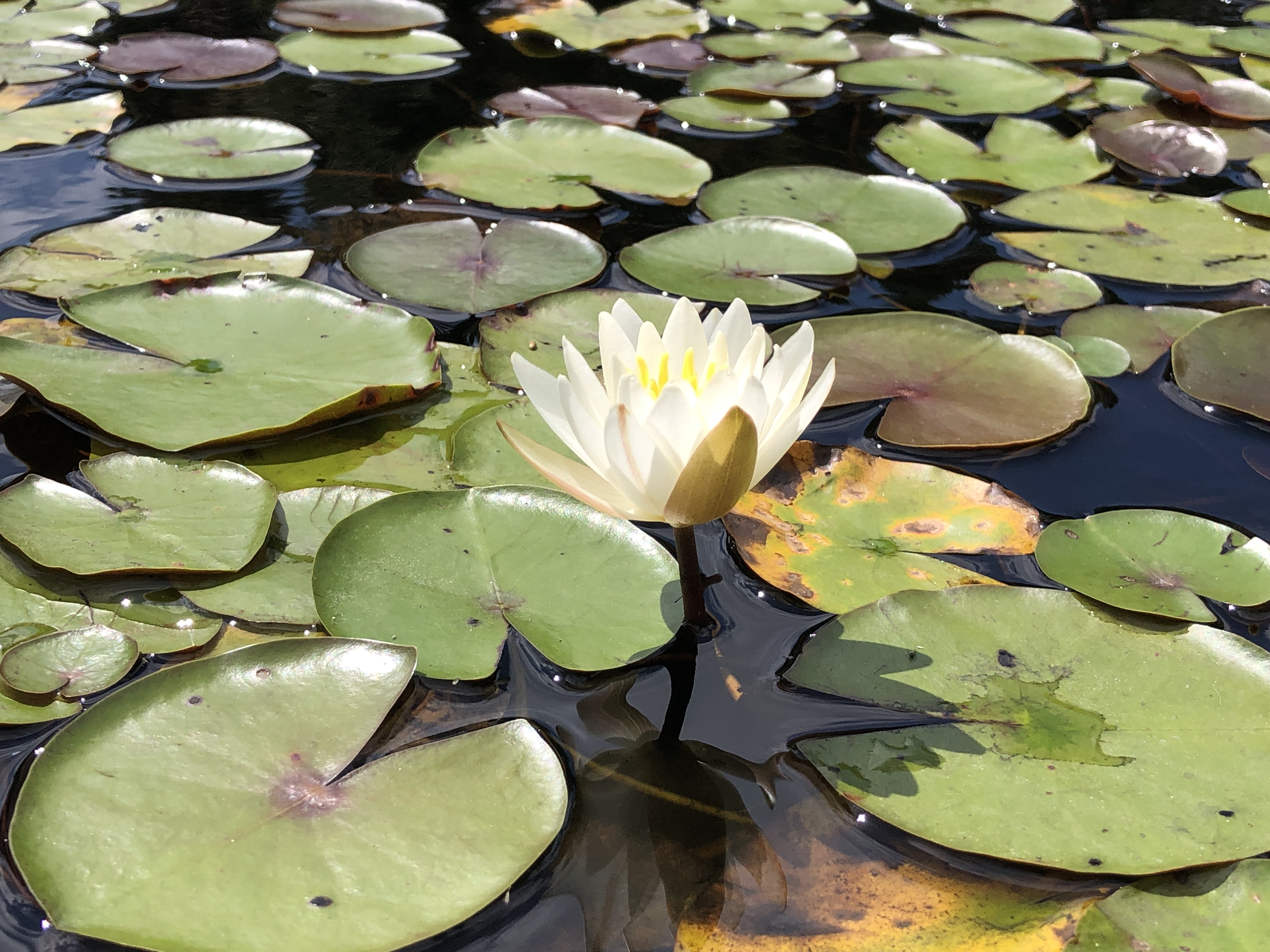

Conservation status
- Least Concern (IUCN 3.1)

- Secure (NatureServe)

Scientific classification
- Kingdom: Plantae
- Clade: Embryophytes
- Clade: Tracheophytes
- Clade: Angiosperms
- Order: Nymphaeales
- Family: Nymphaeaceae
- Genus: Nymphaea
- Subgenus: Nymphaea subg. Nymphaea
- Section: Nymphaea sect. Nymphaea
- Species: N. odorata

Binomial name
- Nymphaea odorata Aiton

Subspecies
- N. odorata subsp. odorata; N. odorata subsp. tuberosa (Paine) Wiersema & Hellq.

Synonyms
- List: Castalia odorata (Aiton) Wood; Leuconymphaea odorata (Aiton) MacMill.

= Nymphaea odorata =

Species of aquatic plant

Nymphaea odorata, also known as the American white waterlily, fragrant water-lily, beaver root, fragrant white water lily, white water lily, sweet-scented white water lily, and sweet-scented water lily, is an aquatic plant belonging to the genus Nymphaea. It can commonly be found in shallow lakes, ponds, and permanent slow moving waters throughout North America where it ranges from Central America to northern Canada. It is also reported from Brazil and Guyana.

== Description ==
This plant is rooted from branched rhizomes that gives rise to long petioles that terminate in smooth floating leaves. The flowers float as well. They are radially symmetric with prominent yellow stamens and many white petals. The flowers open each day and close again each night and are very fragrant. Once the flowers are pollinated, the developing fruit is pulled back under water for maturation.

== Cytology ==
The chromosome count is n = 28 or n = 56. The genome size is 1574.58 Mb.

== Chemistry ==
The lignans nymphaeoside A and icariside E, and the flavonols kaempferol 3-O-alpha-l-rhamnopyranoside (afzelin), quercetin 3-O-alpha-l-rhamnopyranoside (quercitrin), myricetin 3-O-alpha-l-rhamnopyranoside (myricitrin), quercetin 3-O-(6'-O-acetyl)-beta-d-galactopyranoside, myricetin 3-O-beta-d-galactopyranoside and myricetin 3-O-(6'-O-acetyl)-beta-d-galactopyranoside can be found in N. odorata.

== Taxonomy ==
=== Subspecies ===
It is divided into two subspecies:

- Nymphaea odorata subsp. odorata
- Nymphaea odorata subsp. tuberosa (Paine) Wiersema & Hellq.

== Uses ==
The fragrant water-lily has both medical and edible parts. The seeds, flowers and rhizomes can all be eaten raw or cooked. The root can be boiled to produce a liquid which can be gargled to treat sore throats or drunk to treat diarrhea. The rhizomes were also used by Native Americans to treat coughs and colds. The stem can be placed directly on teeth to treat a toothache.

The muck-submerged stems are eaten by muskrats.
