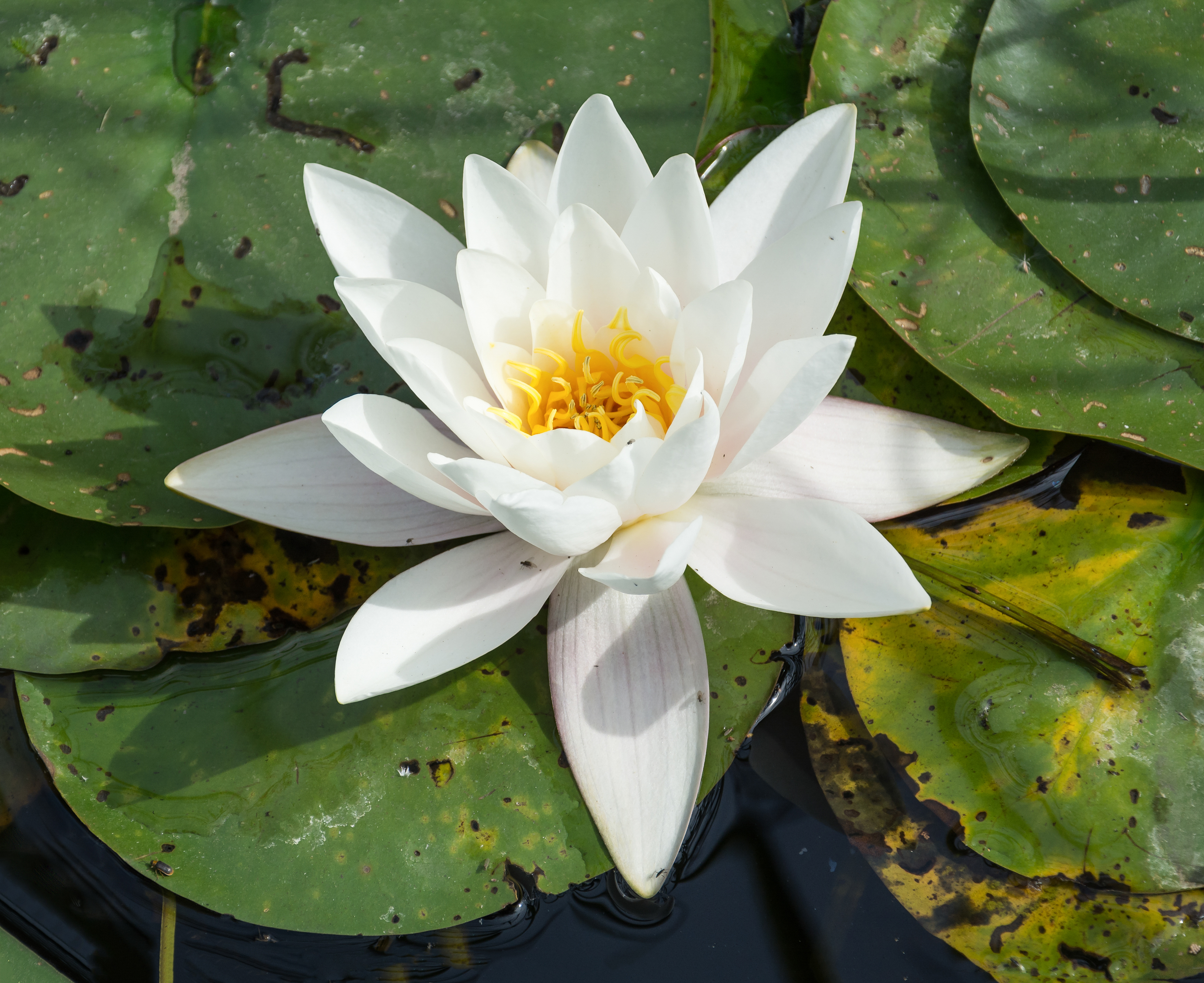

Conservation status
- Least Concern (IUCN 3.1)

Scientific classification
- Kingdom: Plantae
- Clade: Tracheophytes
- Clade: Angiosperms
- Order: Nymphaeales
- Family: Nymphaeaceae
- Genus: Nymphaea
- Subgenus: Nymphaea subg. Nymphaea
- Section: Nymphaea sect. Nymphaea
- Species: N. alba

Binomial name
- Nymphaea alba L.

Subspecies
- Nymphaea alba subsp. alba; Nymphaea alba subsp. occidentalis (Ostenf.) Hyl.

Synonyms
- Species: Castalia alba (L.) Greene; Leuconymphaea alba (L.) Kuntze; subsp. alba: Castalia biradiata (Sommerauer) Hayek; Castalia minoriflora Simonk.; Castalia speciosa Salisb.; Nymphaea alba var. angustata Casp.; Nymphaea alba subsp. biradiata (Sommerauer) Hartm.; Nymphaea alba var. biradiata (Sommerauer) Hartm.; Nymphaea alba var. chlorocarpa Casp.; Nymphaea alba var. chlorocarpa Casp.; Nymphaea alba var. cincta Casp.; Nymphaea alba var. circumvallata Casp.; Nymphaea alba f. coronata Casp.; Nymphaea alba f. csepelensis Soó; Nymphaea alba var. delicata Lovassy; Nymphaea alba var. depressa Casp.; Nymphaea alba var. erythrocarpa Casp.; Nymphaea alba var. erythrocarpa (Hentze) Casp.; Nymphaea alba var. flava Casp.; Nymphaea alba var. froebelii Lovassy; Nymphaea alba var. melocarpa Casp.; Nymphaea alba var. minor Mérat; Nymphaea alba var. minoriflora (Simonk.) Asch. & Graebn.; Nymphaea alba var. minoriflora (Simonk.) Graebn.; Nymphaea alba subsp. minoriflora (Simonk.) Stucchi; Nymphaea alba var. parvifolia Rouy & Foucaud; Nymphaea alba var. rubra Lönnr.; Nymphaea alba var. semiaperta Casp.; Nymphaea alba var. sphaerocarpa Casp.; Nymphaea alba var. splendens Casp.; Nymphaea alba var. urceolata (Hentze) Casp.; Nymphaea basniniana Turcz.; Nymphaea biradiata Sommerauer; Nymphaea candida f. biradiata (Sommerauer) Lindstr.; Nymphaea erythrocarpa Hentze; Nymphaea exumbonata Rupr.; Nymphaea gladstoniana Lovassy; Nymphaea kosteletzkyi Lehm.; Nymphaea melocarpa (Casp.) Asch. & Graebn.; Nymphaea milletii Boreau; Nymphaea minoriflora (Simonk.) Wissjul.; Nymphaea neglecta Hausl.; Nymphaea officinalis Gaterau; Nymphaea parviflora Hentze; Nymphaea permixta Boreau; Nymphaea polystigma E.H.L.Krause; Nymphaea rotundifolia Hentze; Nymphaea sphaerocarpa Hovey; Nymphaea splendens Hentze; Nymphaea suaveolens Dumort.; Nymphaea urceolata Hentze; Nymphaea venusta Hentze; subsp. occidentalis: Nymphaea alba var. occidentalis Ostenf.; Nymphaea occidentalis (Ostenf.) Moss

= Nymphaea alba =

European white water lily

Species of water lily

Nymphaea alba

Nymphaea alba – commonly called the white water lily, European white water lily, or white nenuphar (/ˈnɛnjʊfɑːr/ NEN-yuu-far) – is an aquatic flowering plant in the family Nymphaeaceae. It is native to North Africa, temperate Asia, Europe, and tropical Asia (Jammu and Kashmir).

Since Nymphaea alba is an aquatic plant, its specialized trichomes are hydropotes, formed at an abaxial surface of the young leaf and packed tightly in the rosette at the rhizome's flattened apex. The rhizomes contain high amounts of carbohydrate and protein.

== Description ==
Nymphaea alba has a round dark green leaves up to 35 cm (14 in) in length and white flowers which usually bloom during the daytime in summer. Both leaves and flowers float on the water's surface. At first, the flower is cup-shaped, with a size of around 8 cm (3.1 in). It increases to 20 cm (7.9 in) and becomes star-shaped over time. The flower's petals are arranged in a row, pointing up surrounding many yellow stamens. The species may spread 150 cm (59 in) per plant.

== Cytology ==
The chromosome count is n = 42. The genome size is 1950 Mb.

== Taxonomy ==
It was first published and described by Carl Linnaeus in his book 'Species Plantarum', on page 510 in 1753. It is the type species of its genus. Within the subgenus Nymphaea subg. Nymphaea it is placed in the section Nymphaea sect. Nymphaea.

The red variety (Nymphaea alba f. rosea) is cultivated from lake Fagertärn ("Fair tarn") in the forest of Tiveden, Sweden, where it was discovered in the early 19th century. The discovery led to large-scale exploitation which nearly made it extinct in the wild before it was protected.

Nymphaea candida J. Presl is sometimes considered a subspecies of N. alba (N. alba L. subsp. candida (J. Presl) Korsh.).

== Distribution and habitat ==
Nymphaea alba is native all over Europe and in parts of North Africa and the Middle East in fresh water. In Africa, it is found in Algeria, Morocco and Tunisia. In temperate Asia, Armenia, Azerbaijan, Siberia, Iran, Iraq, Palestine and Turkey. It is found in tropical Asia, within the Indian territory of Jammu and Kashmir. Lastly, within Europe, it is found in Belarus, Estonia, Latvia, Lithuania, Moldova, Russian Federation, Ukraine, Austria, Belgium, Czech Republic, Germany, Hungary, Netherlands, Poland, Slovakia, Switzerland, Denmark, Finland, Ireland, Norway, Sweden, United Kingdom, Albania, Bosnia and Herzegovina, Bulgaria, Croatia, Greece, Italy, Montenegro, North Macedonia, Romania, Serbia, Slovenia, France, Portugal and Spain. It has been introduced to the Azores, Bangladesh, Chile, parts of China, Myanmar, and New Zealand.

Nymphaea alba grows in ponds, ditches, lakes, or canals with still or slow-moving water.

== Phytochemistry ==
It contains the active alkaloids nupharine and nymphaeine, and is a sedative and an aphrodisiac/anaphrodisiac depending on sources. Although roots and stalks are used in traditional herbal medicine along with the flower, the petals and other flower parts are the most potent. Alcohol can be used to extract the active alkaloids, and it also boosts the sedative effects. The root of the plant was used by monks and nuns for hundreds of years as an anaphrodisiac, being crushed and mixed with wine. In the earliest printed medical textbooks, authors maintained this use, though warning against consuming large and frequent doses.

== Cultivation ==
Nymphaea alba is a vigorous plant which needs plenty of space as the leaves can spread up to 1.5 m (4.9 ft). It prefers to grow in clay or loam in full sun. When it is first introduced into the water, it should be placed rather shallow with the rhizome at around 20 cm (7.9 in) below the surface. As the plant gets established it can be sunk deeper down to a depth of about 90 cm. In nature it regularly grows deeper than this.

In north-eastern India young leaves and peduncles of Nymphaea alba and other species are harvested and eaten as vegetables. The rhizomes are also harvested to be boiled and eaten. Parts of the plant have been used as traditional medicine to treat diarrhea, piles, coughing and other ailments. The flowers are also harvested for decoration and for their pleasant smell, and have a long vase-life.

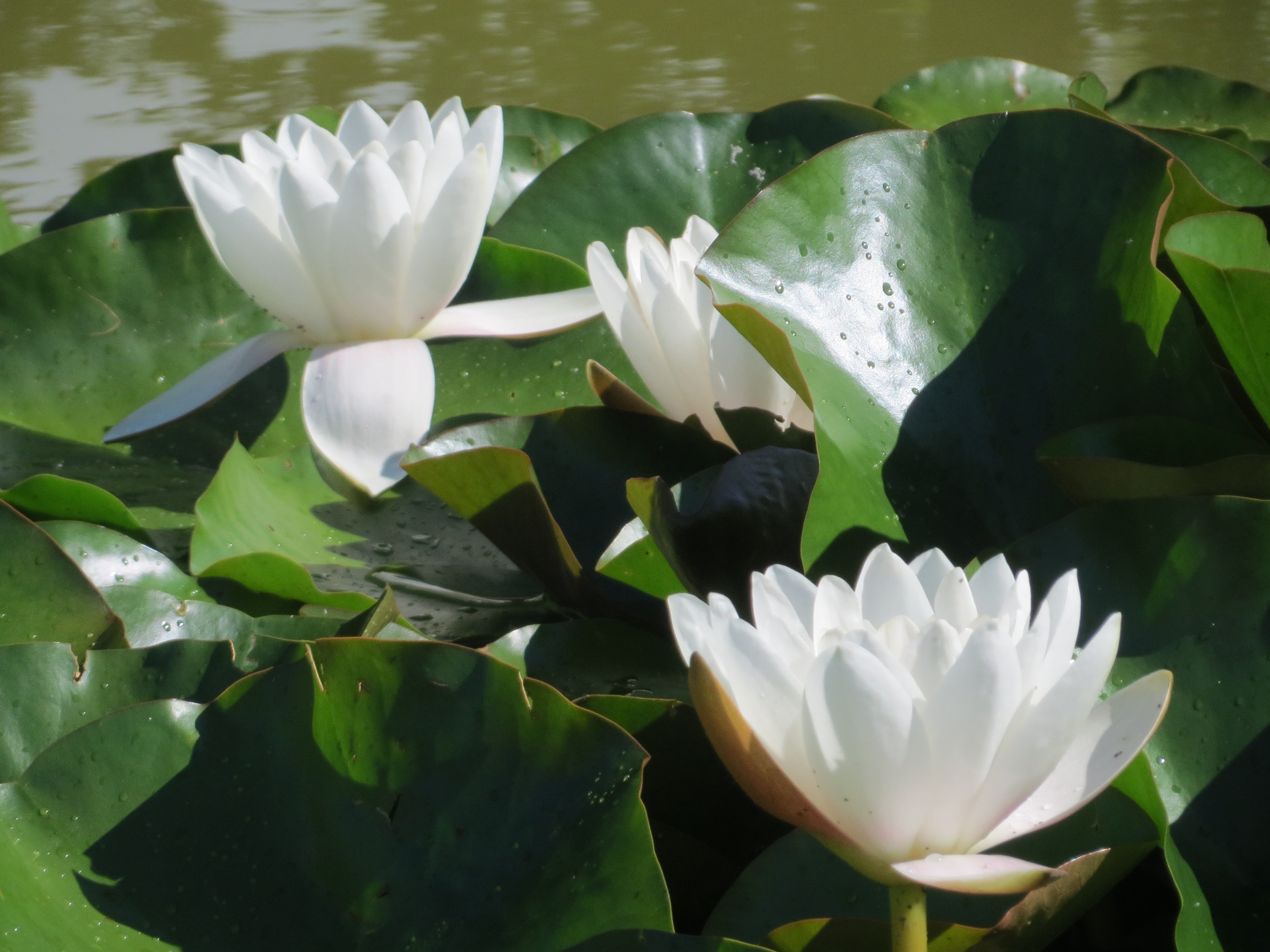

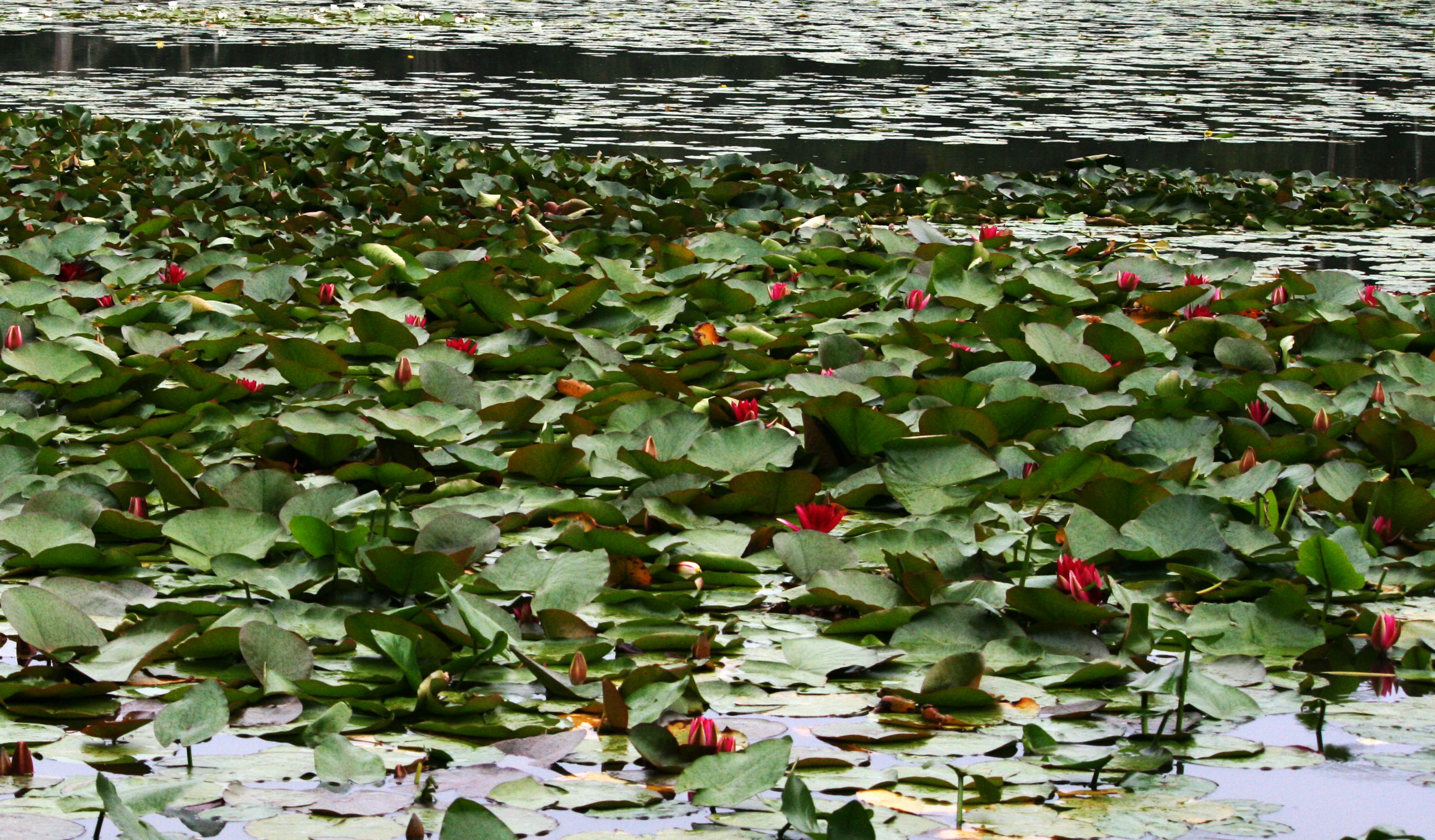
red cultivar
