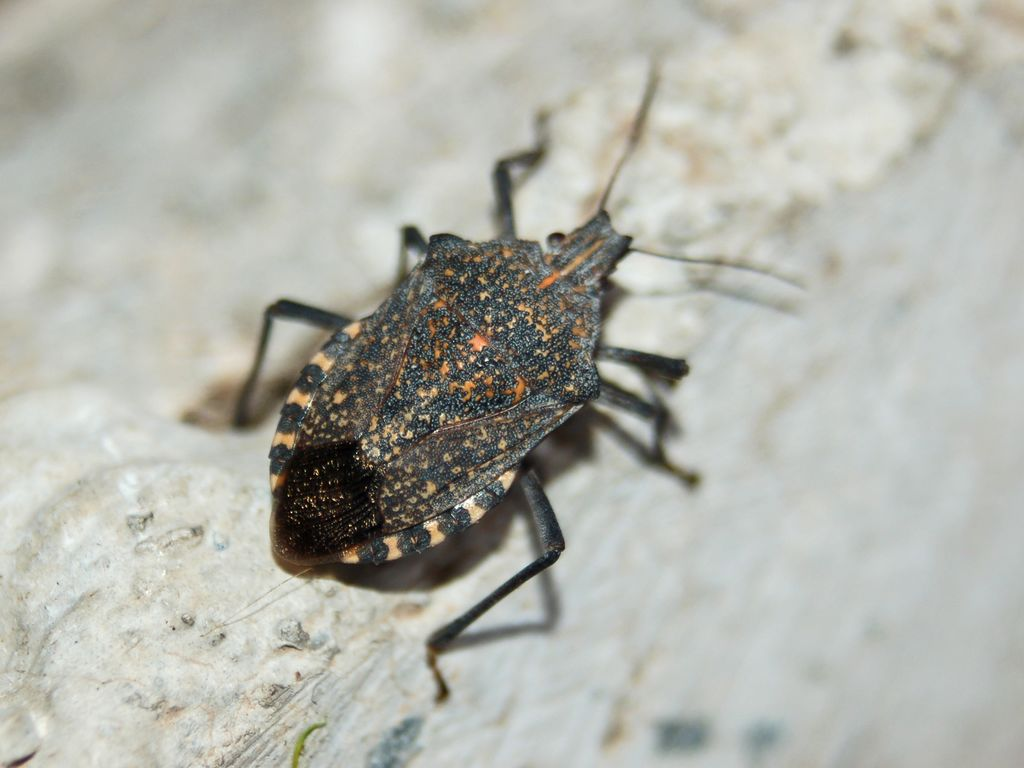

Scientific classification
- Kingdom: Animalia
- Phylum: Arthropoda
- Class: Insecta
- Order: Hemiptera
- Suborder: Heteroptera
- Family: Pentatomidae
- Genus: Apodiphus
- Species: A. amygdali

Binomial name
- Apodiphus amygdali (Germar, 1817)

Synonyms
- Halys amygdali (Germar, 1817); Halys exsculpta (Burmeister, 1835); Halys hellenica (Lefebvre, 1831)

= Apodiphus amygdali =

Species of true bug

Apodiphus amygdali is a species of shield bug belonging to the family Pentatomidae, subfamily Pentatominae.

== Distribution ==
This species can be found in Austria, Albania, Bulgaria, Greece, Italy and North Macedonia.

== Description ==
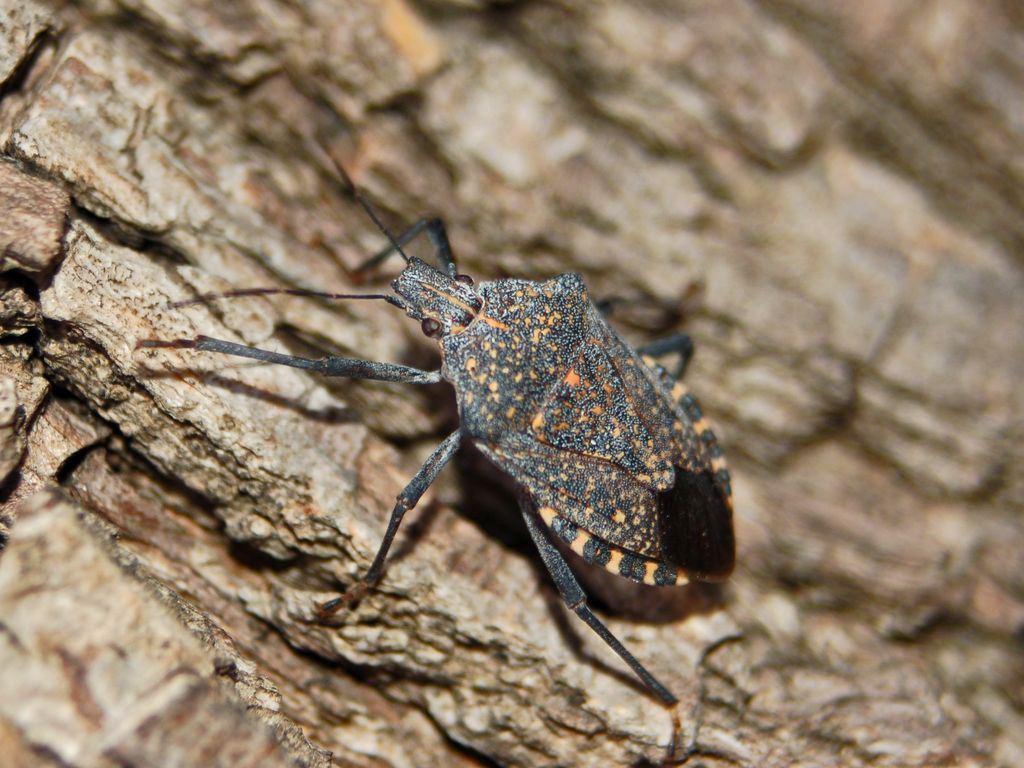
Side view

Apodiphus amygdali can reach a length of about 15 millimetres (0.59 in) and a width of about 8 millimetres (0.31 in). The females are slightly larger than the males. Body is oval, convex dorsally, blackish brown, densely speckled with yellow ocher spots. The pronotum has dentate and concave lateral margins. On the head and pronotum, there is a short ocher or yellowish longitudinal line. The connexivum shows black and ocher or yellowish spots. The long legs and antennae are gray-brown to black.

== Biology ==
Imago and nymphs of these large bugs suck on the stems, leaves, and immature fruits of various deciduous trees and are considered an agricultural pest. They mainly feed on plum (Prunus domestica), apricot (Prunus armeniaca), apple (Malus pumila), olive (Olea europaea), pear (Pyrus communis) and pistachio (Pistacia vera). They attack also silver poplar (Populus alba), Turkish pine (Pinus brutia), plane (Platanus orientalis), field elm (Ulmus minor) and silver willow (Salix alba).

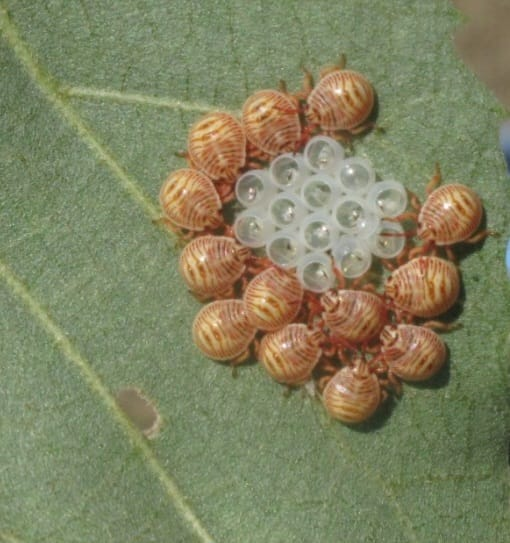
Apodiphus amygdali hatchs (Almond Sting Bug)

They have two generations a year, the first at the end of June and the second at mid-August. Adults of this second generation over winter from October to May. The fertilized females lay on the underside of the leaves masses of eleven to fifteen eggs, which take two to five days to hatch. Nymphs pass through five moltings.
