= Rubus arizonensis =

Scientific classification
- Kingdom: Plantae
- Clade: Tracheophytes
- Clade: Angiosperms
- Clade: Eudicots
- Clade: Rosids
- Order: Rosales
- Family: Rosaceae
- Genus: Rubus
- Species: R. arizonensis

Binomial name
- Rubus arizonensis Focke 1914

Synonyms
- Rubus scolocaulon Brandegee

Berry and plant

Rubus arizonensis, called Arizona dewberry, is a North American species of dewberry in Section Procumbentes of the genus Rubus, a member of the rose family. It is endemic to the Arizona Upland of Arizona and northern Sonora, Mexico.
