= Nils Hylander =

Swedish botanist and mycologist

- Born: 24 October 1904; Norrköping
- Died: 28 July 1970 (aged 65); Uppsala
- Scientific career
- Fields: botany, mycology
- Author abbrev. (botany): Hyl.

Nils Hylander (24 October 1904 in Norrköping – 28 July 1970 in Uppsala) was a Swedish botanist and mycologist. From November 1953 to his death he was curator of the Uppsala University Botanical Garden. He was appointed professor in 1967.

== Career ==
Hylander received his doctorate in botany at Uppsala University in June 1943. His thesis “Die Grassameneinkömmlinge Schwedischer Parke, mit besonderer Berücksichtigung der Hieracia silvaticiformia.”, deals with the plants that were introduced into Swedish parks and larger gardens in the late 1800s via foreign grass seed, including about 140 different subspecies of hawkweed (Hieracium). One of the objectives was to use these park hawkweeds to identify from which locations in Europe the grass seed originated.

His early interest in mycology gave rise to his 1953 publication, with others, of “Enumeratio Uredinearum Scandinavicarum”, a catalogue of rust fungi, but Hylander's greatest contribution was within Swedish vascular plant taxonomy, where he appears as one of the major figures of the twentieth century.

After much preliminary work the first part of “Nordisk kärlväxtflora”, the Nordic vascular plant flora, was published in 1953; the second followed in 1966. The flora, which was intended to be published in five parts, was largely a one-man job and work on it was sustained with great ambition. The two published parts deal with several major and difficult genera, where each species is described very fully in a highly compressed text. The Flora work entailed his own basic research, which involved a critical examination of herbarium material and literature and some experimental crops and field studies. Hylander's treatment of the Nordic vascular plants takes a modern approach and is characterized by deep insights concerning, for example, species variation in the field. The discursive parts that accompany the descriptions are of great value. The Nordic vascular plant flora can be considered as Hylander's most important work and is already an international standard work. There is a more or less finished manuscript of the third part. As preparation for the flora one can to some extent consider the 3rd (1941) and 4th (1955) editions, prepared by Hylander, of the “Förteckning över Skandinaviens växter”, Index of Scandinavian plants, part :1 Vascular Plants, published by Lund Botanical Association. These editions contained several significant novelties for Nordic floristics both in terms of nomenclature and systematics, as more fully discussed in an important work “Nomenklatorische und systematische Studien über nordische Gefässpflanzen” (1945). Hylander's great insights into Nordic vascular plant taxonomy led to several international assignments, including as a regional adviser for Flora Europaea.

Hylander showed his taste for taxonomically difficult plant groups in a couple of studies of the genera Alchemilla and Mentha. He devoted a great interest to the so-called adventive plants, plants that temporarily pop up in Sweden (but can be a steady contribution to the Swedish flora). Hylander reported occurrences of such in a variety of small essays, and as a final product of this work, one can consider the posthumously published “Prima loca plantarum vascularium Sueciae”, whose manuscript was completed a few months before his death.

Hylander's other main interest was Swedish horticulture. He devoted several works to ornamental plant taxonomy, such as peonies, spirea, begonias and serviceberry. The most important of these works deals with the many representatives of the genus Hosta (plantain lilies) cultivated in Sweden. A very useful book is “Våra prydnadsväxters namn på svenska och latin” (Our ornamental plant names in Swedish and Latin) (1948, 2 ed 1960). This recognized and named most of the ornamentals grown in Sweden. Its importance lies in the rehabilitation and normalization of the Latin and Swedish names of these plants, a naming which had previously been rather chaotic. In his efforts to find the appropriate Swedish name for many ornamental plants Hylander showed a great inventiveness, and his attempts to stabilize the allocation of Swedish names seems to have had a good influence. He was also active in the work of developing international rules for ornamental plant naming. Hylander was also interested in dendrology. In a couple of major works (1957), he described birches and alders with different leaf shapes. He took a prominent position in The Association for Dendrology and Park Care and appeared frequently as both tour guide, demonstrator and rapporteur at the association's excursions.

In 1953 Hylander became the first garden curator at the Botanical Garden in Uppsala, a unique and personal position he retained until his death. Through his work the Botanical Gardens became one of the most important in Scandinavia. His special interests are reflected in the garden's finest attractions and in both scientifically and aesthetically well-designed species selection. Under his leadership, there were introduced a number of new plants whose hardiness and value for cultivation was tested in extensive experiments.

He was not a field botanist in the accepted sense but had seen more species in the Swedish flora than most. He was of an elegant appearance, and it was said that he would rather abandon a visit to a swamp than take off his paten leather shoes. He was a bachelor with careful habits, critical and even egocentric, but he also had great charm and a broad general knowledge. This was expressed in his various writings on the fringes of botany. Several of these deals with plant names, both Swedish and scientific, often related to any curious and interesting facts, such as plant genera named after Swedes.

== Some publications ==
- 1948. List of amendments to the provisional minutes of the Symposium on Botanical Nomenclature and Taxonomy
- Hylander, N; I Jørstad, JA Nannfeldt. 1953. Enumeratio uredinearum scandinavicarum. Opera botanica 1 ( 1)
- 1957. Cardaminopsis suecica (fr.) Hiit., a Northern Amphidiploid species. Bulletin du Jardin botanique de l'État à Bruxelles 27 (4 ): 591-604

== Books ==
- 1941. De svenska formerna av Mentha gentilis L. coll.. Ed. Uppsala, Almqvist & Wiksells boktr. 49 pp.
- 1945. Nomenklatorische und systematische Studien über nordische Gefässpflanzen. Ed. Uppsala, Almqvist & Wiksells Boktryckeri ab. 337 pp.
- 1954. The genus Hosta in Swedish gardens: With contributions to the taxonomy, nomenclature and botanical history of the genus (Acta Horti Bergiani). Ed. Almquist & Wiksells. 420 pp.
- 1955. Förteckning över Nordens växter. 1, Kärlväxter = Vascular plants. Ed. Lund : Gleerup, 175 pp.
- Nordisk kärlväxtflora I - II. Omfattande Sveriges, Norges, Danmarks, Östfennoskandias, islands och Färöarnas kärlkryptogamer och fanerogamer, 2 vols. Vol. 1: Stockholm 1953, 392+XV pp. Vol. 2 1966, 455+X pp.
- 1971. Prima loca plantarum vascularium Sueciae. Plantae subspontaneae vel in tempore recentiore adventitiae. Första litteraturuppgift för Sveriges vildväxande kärlväxter jämte uppgifter om första svenska fynd. Förvildade eller i senare tid inkomna växter. Ed. Almqvist & Wiksell, Uppsala. 332 pp.
- 1997. Vara Kulturvaxters Namn Pa Svenska Och Latin. 3ª ed. 302 pp. ISBN 91-36-00281-X
