= Eutherini =

Scientific classification
- Kingdom: Animalia
- Phylum: Arthropoda
- Class: Insecta
- Order: Diptera
- Family: Tachinidae
- Subfamily: Dexiinae
- Tribe: Eutherini; Townsend, 1912

Tribe of flies

Eutherini is a tribe of flies in the family Tachinidae.

== Genera ==
- Euthera Loew, 1854
- Redtenbacheria Schiner, 1861
