= Midway site =

Archaeological site in Wisconsin, US

Midway Site (47LC19)
- Location in Wisconsin Location in United States
- 43°57′25″N 91°20′31″W
- Location: in La Crosse County, Wisconsin

Site notes
- Area: 11 acres (4.5 ha)

The Midway Site (47LC19) is a prehistoric Upper Mississippian Oneota site in La Crosse County, Wisconsin. It is located about 10 miles north of LaCrosse near the juncture of the Black and Mississippi Rivers.

== History of archaeological investigations ==
The site was first excavated in the early 1920s by Dr. A.H. Sanford of the La Crosse State College (now the University of Wisconsin–La Crosse), and again in 1929 by W.C. McKern, under the auspices of the Milwaukee Public Museum. Further excavations took place in 1964 by Guy Gibbon under the auspices of the University of Illinois.

== Results of 1964 Excavations ==
Excavations at the site yielded Prehistoric artifacts, pit features, animal bone, plant remains and a burial.

=== Structures and Features ===
15 features were reported at the site, of which 14 were prehistoric (the 15th was a modern era pig burial). 12 were designated as “refuse pits” and contained animal bone, stone tools and debitage, pottery sherds and charcoal. There was also one burial and one mussel shell heap.

=== Animal Remains ===
Remains from several species were recovered from the site. The main species present were deer, beaver, porcupine, dog, bear, elk, bison, mussels, catfish and bowfin. These remains were not modified into tools like the bone tools described in the Artifacts section below, and may be considered food remains or, in the case of the dog and bear, possibly the remains of ceremonial activities. Dog sacrifice and dog meat consumption was observed to have ceremonial and religious implications in early Native American tribes. Bear worship and ceremonialism has also been recorded in the ethnological record.

=== Plant Remains ===
Several fragments of food plant remains were recovered from the site, including maize, beans, acorn and hickory nut shell, and plum pits. Some wood charcoal taken from a pit feature was identified as oak.

=== Artifacts ===
==== Pottery Artifacts ====
No whole or reconstructable vessels were recovered from the site, so the analysis was based upon examination of rim and body sherds. A total of 3,283 sherds was recovered, of which 98.3% were shell-tempered. The remaining 1.7% was grit-tempered and interpreted to be representative of the earlier Woodland period.

The pottery consists of globular vessels with restricted orifices, smooth surface finish, everted rim profiles and rounded lips. Handles were sometimes present. Decoration was applied to the lip top, inside lip and the area from the neck to shoulder. Decorative techniques consisted of vertical and/or diagonal lines arranged in patterns such as chevrons, sometimes combined with punctates.

Three pottery types were noted. They are described below:

- Allamakee Trailed - this type was defined at the Upper Iowa River Oneota Site Complex and is the dominant pottery type at Midway. The characteristics described above primarily apply to this type.
- Red Banks Punctate - this type includes vessels decorated with groups of incised diagonal lines with punctates in the spaces between lines.
- Koshkonong Bold - consists of vessels with finger trailed decoration applied to the shoulder area; first defined at Carcajou Point.

==== Other Artifacts ====
Non-pottery artifacts recovered from the site included:

- Chipped stone artifacts - including 24 projectile points, 13 knives, 92 end scrapers, 22 side scrapers, 9 cores and 3 hammerstones. Of the projectile points, the most numerous category (20) was the small triangular Madison point.
- Ground stone artifacts - including 4 abrading stones, 1 grinding stone and 3 catlinite fragments
- Bone artifacts - including 1 bison scapula hoe, 1 worked swan humerus and 1 worked deer metapodial
- Copper artifacts- including 1 ring, 1 perforator and 5 sheet copper fragments

The non-pottery artifacts found at an archaeological site can provide useful cultural context as well as a glimpse into the domestic tasks performed at a site; ceremonial or religious activities; recreational activities; and clothing or personal adornment.

Some of the most prominent and diagnostic non-pottery artifacts are presented here in more detail:

Material	Description	Image	Qty	Function / use	Comments / associations
Chipped stone	Small triangular points (aka Madison points)	Projectile points	24	Hunting/fishing/warfare	Also known as “arrowheads”; are thought to be arrow-tips for bows-and-arrows. The usage of the bow-and-arrow seems to have greatly increased during the Late Woodland, probably as a result of increased conflict.
Chipped stone	Biface blades/knives	Biface knives	1 whole, 12 fragmentary	Domestic function / cutting applications	Typical of Upper Mississippian sites, particularly Huber and Oneota (Orr focus)
Chipped stone	End scraper	End scrapers	92	Domestic function / processing wood or hides	Typical of Upper Mississippian sites, particularly Huber and Oneota (Orr focus); at Midway they are far more numerous than projectile points
Stone	Arrow shaft straightener	Sandstone abraders	4	Domestic function / straightening arrow shafts for bows-and-arrows	Typical at Upper Mississippian sites

== Orr focus ==
The Orr focus is a regional manifestation of the Upper Mississippian Oneota cultures which were present throughout the American Midwest in the late Prehistoric and Protohistoric to early Historic periods. The subsistence base of the Orr focus people, like most Upper Mississippians, was primarily agricultural supplemented by hunting, fishing and gathering.

The Orr focus is distinctive from other Oneota Foci mainly in terms of the pottery which is based on rectilinear (instead of curvilinear) decoration and frequent notching on the lip. This pottery was first noted at the Upper Iowa River Oneota Site Complex and was designated Allamakee Trailed.

It has been pointed out that the Huber Phase pottery (from the Chicago area) very closely resembles Orr focus. Specifically, Huber Trailed is thought to be a very similar type to Allamakee Trailed. Huber Trailed has rectilinear patterns, lip notching and very similar vessel form to Allamakee Trailed. A detailed comparison of pottery from a Huber site (Oak Forest) and at the Midway site did reveal some differences between them: the lips on Orr pottery were almost always rounded, which Huber lips could be rounded, flattened or beveled; the rim profiles on the Orr pottery were almost always vertical while the Huber pottery more often had inward or outward curve; the Huber necks were more often angular while the Orr necks were more often curved; and trailed lines were more often to be combined with punctate decoration on Orr than Huber.

Both Orr focus and Huber have been dated to the late Prehistoric to Protohistoric to early Historic periods. European trade goods have been recovered from the Upper Iowa River Oneota Site Complex, but not from Midway. Therefore, it is thought that Midway is slightly older than the Iowa River sites. There are no radiocarbon dates from Midway, but Gibbon estimated the occupation to be around A.D. 1500.

The Orr focus sites are located in the same area that the early French explorers and fur traders found the Ioway Native American tribe. Archaeologists are in general agreement that the Orr Phase pottery represents the Prehistoric cultural remains of the Ioway tribe, as well as the closely related Otoe tribe.

== Significance ==
The Midway Site is a late Oneota site affiliated with the Orr focus. The pottery at Orr focus sites differs from earlier Oneota such as Koshkonong focus and Grand River focus based on details in the pottery; Orr focus pottery has fine incised straight line decoration on smooth surface, compared to the earlier forms which are based on curvilinear patterns with wider lines.

The evidence from plant and animal remains was not enough to make a firm determination on the seasonality of occupation at Midway, but based on the presence of a bison scapula hoe and cultivated plants (maize and beans) it was thought to be at least a semi-sendentary village site, if not year-round.
