= Gentleman Farm site =

Archaeological site in Illinois, United States

- Location in Illinois Location in United States
- 41°19′17″N 88°40′25″W
- Location: in LaSalle County, Illinois, on the Illinois River

Site notes
- Area: 1 acre (0.40 ha)

The Gentleman Farm site is an archaeological site located in LaSalle County, Illinois, on the Illinois River. It is a multi-component site with the main occupation being a Langford tradition component of Upper Mississippian affiliation.

== History of archaeological investigations ==
The site was brought to the attention of the Illinois State Museum as it was scheduled to be destroyed during construction of the Bulls Island Cut-Off on the Illinois River. Salvage excavations took place in 1940, but a comprehensive site report was not generated until James A. Brown created one in 1967.

== Results of data analysis ==
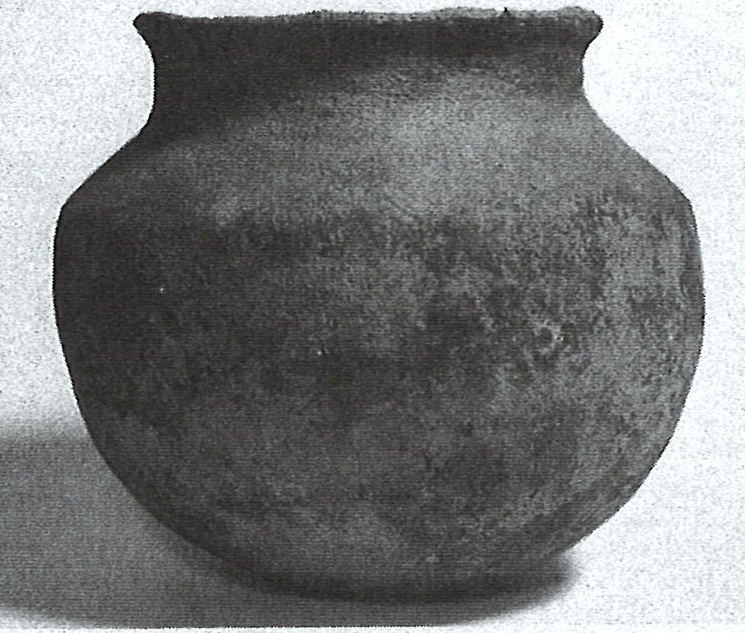
Langford plain vessel

Langford trailed vessels

Langford noded vessels

Langford bold vessel

Excavations at the site yielded prehistoric and historic artifacts, pit features, animal bone (which was not analyzed) and burials. Two areas of the site were identified; a village area and a burial mound.

=== Components ===
The main occupation was affiliated with the Upper Mississippian Langford tradition. Earlier occupations were indicated by the presence of a few projectile points of earlier type; and a Protohistoric or early Historic occupation was indicated by the recovery of 2 gunflints.

=== Features ===
There were no house structures noted at the site. Seven pit features were described, categorized into three types: storage pits (4), 1 “ash-filled” pit, and two pits filled with broken stone (aka fire-cracked rock) which were interpreted as roasting pits.

The refuse pits were thought to have first been storage pits that were converted into refuse pits once their contents began to sour. They contained animal bone, charcoal and artifacts.

The roasting pits appear to correspond to what has ethnographically been described as “macoupin roasting pits” by the early French explorers Deliette and LaSalle and described from the Zimmerman site. The macoupins are apparently tubers from a species of water lily, perhaps the American Lotus (Nelumbo lutea). Tubers of Nelumbo lutea have been recovered from similar roasting pits at the Elam and Schwerdt sites on the Kalamazoo River in western Michigan; and tubers of the white water lily (Nymphaea tuberosa) have been recovered from roasting pits at the Griesmer site in northwestern Indiana. This particular cooking technique may have been used prehistorically for several species of similar water lilies, or other similar root plants. No tubers were specifically recovered from the Gentleman Farm site, however. This may be because there was no systematic effort by the excavators to collect plant remains.

=== Burials ===
48 burials were excavated during the salvage project. It was estimated based on the density of burials that there were between 200 and 300 within the entire mound. 19 burials were observed to contain grave goods. The most common type of grave goods were pottery vessels, shell spoons and items of personal adornment.

=== Artifacts ===
==== Pottery artifacts ====
Archaeologists often find pottery to be a useful tool in analyzing a prehistoric culture because it is often plentiful at a site and the details of manufacture and decoration are sensitive indicators of time, space and culture.

Several whole or reconstructable pottery vessels were recovered from the burials, which greatly facilitated the analysis.

===== Upper Mississippian component =====
A total of 1,498 sherds and complete vessels were collected from the site, of which 96% were identified as Langford ware of Upper Mississippian affiliation. Also present were vessels identified as Aztalan series and Adams tradition; as well as an unidentified shell-tempered ware.

Langford ware was first reported at the Fisher site, and has also been found at the nearby Zimmerman and Plum Island sites. It is characterized by grit-tempered, globular vessels with restricted orifice and well-defined shoulders and excurved rim profiles. Surface finish is usually smoothed and decoration, when present, is applied to the neck and shoulder areas and consists of incised and trailed lines, punctates and finger impressions, combined to form arches and festoons. Lugs and loop handles are present on some vessels and nodes are also sometimes present.

The following types of Langford Ware were reported from the burial mound vessels:

- Langford plain (2 vessels) – smooth surface with no decoration
- Langford trailed (5 vessels) – decorated with fine to medium-lined decoration
- Langford bold (1 vessel) – decorated with wide-lined (aka finger-trailed) decoration
- Langford noded (3 vessels) – vessels with row of nodes around shoulder
- Langford plain/thick (61 sherds) – sherds >0.9 mm thick

==== Other artifacts ====
Non-pottery artifacts recovered from the site included:

- Chipped stone artifacts – triangular projectile points, notched or stemmed projectile points, scrapers (including one humpback scraper), knives (various types), gunflints and drills (one expanding-base and one parallel-sided)
- Ground stone artifacts – a hematite burnisher and a nut-cracking stone
- Bone artifacts – deer jaw sickles, awls and other worked bone fragments that could not be easily categorized
- Antler artifacts – a socketed and tanged projectile point
- Shell artifacts – shell spoons (subdivided into variants based on method of manufacture), a pendant, scrapers, a hair ornament and disc beads
- Copper artifacts – ear discs

The non-pottery artifacts found at an archaeological site can provide useful cultural context as well as a glimpse into the domestic tasks performed at a site; ceremonial or religious activities; recreational activities; and clothing or personal adornment.

Some of the most prominent and diagnostic non-pottery artifacts are presented here in more detail:

| Material | Description | Image | Qty | Function / use | Comments / associations |
|---|---|---|---|---|---|
| Chipped stone | Small triangular projectile points (aka Madison points) | Projectile points | 11 | Hunting/fishing/warfare | Also known as “arrowheads”; are thought to be tips for arrows. The usage of the bow and arrow seems to have greatly increased after A.D. 1000, probably as a result of increased conflict. |
| Chipped stone | Humpback scraper | Projectile points | 1 | Domestic function / processing wood or hides | Typical of Upper Mississippian sites, particularly Huber and Oneota (Orr Focus) |
| Chipped stone | Drill (expanding base) | Expanding base drill | 1 | Domestic function / processing wood or hides | The expanding base drill is a common type in Upper Mississippian contexts |
| Antler | Antler projectile point; socketed and tanged | Antler projectile point | 3 | Hunting/fishing/warfare | The tanged or barbed type is characteristic of Fisher and Langford traditions; the unbarbed type is more typical of Oneota |
| Shell | Shell spoons | Shell spoons | 9 | Domestic function / food preparation and-or serving | The shell spoons were found as grave goods in the Gentleman Farm burials; they were also present in the Upper Mississippian Heally Complex at the Zimmerman site |

== Significance ==
The Gentleman Farm site is a Langford tradition site like the nearby Zimmerman (Heally component), Fisher (B complex) and Plum Island sites. Although there are no radiocarbon dates available from Gentleman Farm, based on dates obtained from sites with similar artifacts, the site is thought to date to approximately A.D. 1200–1500.

No house structures were present at the site, and based on the lack of household artifacts such as manos and milling stones, it is not thought to be a permanent village. It may have been a specialized site related to building the mound and/or interring the burials.
