= Carcajou Point site =

Archaeological site in Wisconsin, United States

Carcajou Point Site
- Location in Wisconsin Location in United States
- 42°54′00″N 88°59′00″W
- Location: On the north shore of Lake Koshkonong in Jefferson County, Wisconsin

Site notes
- Area: Up to 240 acres

The Carcajou Point site (47JE2, a.k.a. the Carcajou site, Carcajou village or White Crow's village) is located in Jefferson County, Wisconsin, on Lake Koshkonong. It is a multi-component site with prehistoric Upper Mississippian Oneota and Historic components.

The site was occupied by Native Americans as late as the 1820s and 1830s, when the Ho-Chunk tribe resided there. At that time, it was called "White Crow's village" after the name of the chief.

== History of archaeological investigations ==
For many years Carcajou Point was known as a locality where Native American and early European antiquities were present. The archaeologist W.C. McKern referred to the Carcajou Village site on a list of uninvestigated sites in 1945. In 1957 the site was excavated under the auspices of the Wisconsin Archaeological Society, and in 1962 Robert Hall created a site report to discuss the findings and compare them to other Oneota sites in Wisconsin.

== Results of data analysis ==
Excavations at the site yielded prehistoric and Historic artifacts, house structures, pit features, burials, animal bone and plant remains.

=== Structures ===
Three types of house structures were identified at the site. The first is a mat-covered wigwam with pole frame-based foundation; this type was based on observation of circular placement of post-molds. The second type is a rectangular structure resembling a bark summer-house described from the early Historic period. The third is a square structure with wall-trench construction which resembles the house structures found in the Heally component of the Zimmerman site and the Middle Mississippian Aztalan site about 13 miles north of Carcajou Point. This type is associated with radiocarbon dates of A.D. 998 and A.D. 1028 at Carcajou Point.

=== Features ===
79 pit features were excavated in the 1957 fieldwork. Hall's report did not provide a typology of feature types but it was implied that the main type was refuse pits. The refuse pits at Carcajou Point were thought to have started out as storage pits constructed to store food for later consumption; which were converted to refuse pits as their contents soured.

=== Burials ===
Three burials were excavated representing both primary and secondary (ie "bundle") interments. The first was a fragmentary burial found in a basin-shaped pit with no grave goods. The second was a bundle burial with 6 individuals and grave goods consisting of pottery vessels and an arrow shaft straightener. The third was a primary interment of an infant in a refuse pit.

=== Animal remains ===
A full listing of animal remains was not provided in the site report, but deer, elk, bison and turtle are mentioned specifically, with deer identified as the dietary staple.

=== Plant remains ===
Very few plant remains were recovered during excavations, because flotation techniques were not yet in widespread use among archaeologists. One kernel of maize was recovered from feature contexts, along with charred seeds which were not identified.

=== Artifacts ===
==== Pottery artifacts ====
Archaeologists often find pottery to be a useful tool in analyzing a prehistoric culture. It is usually plentiful at a site and the details of manufacture and decoration are sensitive indicators of time, space and culture.

3,685 sherds and one complete vessel were recovered in the 1957 excavations. Of these, 48 were Late Woodland in affiliation, 39 came from miniature children's vessels and the remaining 3,594 are from the Upper Mississippian Oneota component.

Almost all of the Upper Mississippian Oneota sherds were shell-tempered with smooth surface. 14 sherds were cordmarked, 3 sherds were observed to have traces of red paint, and 3 sherds had black paint.

During the artifact analysis, sherds were categorized into 27 different groups, but only 7 of these groups are actually recognized pottery types. The remainder are mostly body sherds which did not have enough information to be assigned to a definite type.

The following types were identified or created to classify the pottery at Carcajou Point:

- **Carcajou Curvilinear** - based on 11 vessels from Carcajou Point and 2 vessels from the Walker-Hooper Site, located in Green Lake County, Wisconsin. Consists of shell-tempered, globular jars with restricted orifice, well-defined shoulders, everted rim profile and notched lips. Surface finish is smooth and decoration is applied between the neck and shoulder in the form of interlocking scrolls sometimes with hatched areas, and meanders. Occasionally handles are present. Early examples have angular shoulders. Grand River Trailed is similar except for the notched lips.
  - Time period: Prehistoric to Protohistoric/Early Historic.
  - Prehistoric cultural affiliation: Upper Mississippian Oneota (Koshkonong and Grand River Foci).
  - Protohistoric/historic Cultural affiliation: unknown, possibly Ho-Chunk.
- **Carcajou Plain** - based on 1 complete vessel and 9 rim sherds. Same as Carcajou Curvilinear except decoration is limited to lip notching, and some other vessel forms are present including small vertical-sided bowls and shallow pans.
  - Time period: Prehistoric to Protohistoric/Early Historic.
  - Prehistoric cultural affiliation: Upper Mississippian Oneota (Koshkonong and Grand River Foci).
  - Protohistoric/historic Cultural affiliation: unknown, possibly Ho-Chunk.
- **Grand River Trailed** - based on 4 vessels from Carcajou Point and 25 vessels from other Wisconsin sites. Consists of shell-tempered, globular jars with restricted orifice, well-defined shoulders and everted rim profile. Rims are not notched. Surface finish is smooth and decoration is applied between the neck and shoulder in the form of interlocking scrolls, meanders, linear and circular, crescent-shaped and similar elements arranged in patterns. Handles are rare. Carcajou Curvilinear is similar except for the notched lips.
  - Time period: Prehistoric to Protohistoric/Early Historic.
  - Prehistoric cultural affiliation: Upper Mississippian Oneota (Koshkonong and Grand River Foci).
  - Protohistoric/historic Cultural affiliation: unknown, possibly Ho-Chunk.
- **Grand River Plain** - based on 7 vessels from Carcajou Point and 36 vessels from other Wisconsin sites. Same as Grand River Trailed except no decoration. Bowl shapes are also present.
  - Time period: Prehistoric to Protohistoric/Early Historic.
  - Prehistoric cultural affiliation: Upper Mississippian Oneota (Koshkonong and Grand River Foci).
  - Protohistoric/historic Cultural affiliation: unknown, possibly Ho-Chunk.
- **Koshkonong Bold** - based on 6 vessels from Carcajou Point and other sites in Wisconsin. Consists of shell-tempered, globular jars with restricted orifice and everted rims. Lips are sometimes notched. Handles are rare. Decoration consists of wide-trailed ("finger-trailed") lines applied vertically or diagonally from the neck to shoulder. This type is associated with a radiocarbon date of A.D. 1528 at Carcajou Point. Finger-trailed vessels have been found at the Midway site in LaCrosse County, Wisconsin, as well as other Oneota sites, and in Huber Phase sites around the Chicago area.
  - Time period: Prehistoric to Protohistoric/Early Historic.
  - Prehistoric cultural affiliation: Upper Mississippian Oneota (Koshkonong and Grand River Foci).
  - Protohistoric/historic Cultural affiliation: unknown, possibly Ho-Chunk.
- **Busseyville Grooved Paddle** - based on 11 body sherds from the 1957 excavations at Carcajou Point as well as numerous body sherds in surface collections from Carcajou Point and other Wisconsin sites. Consists of shell-tempered, globular vessels with everted rim profile, squared lip and grooved-paddle impressed surface finish. Similar to Fort Ancient pottery from the Madisonville Focus and Danner Paddle-Impressed from the Danner Component of the Zimmerman site.
  - Time period: Early Historic.
  - Cultural affiliation: unknown.
- **Madison Cord-Impressed** - based on 2 rim sherds. Grit-tempered vessels with cord-impressed surface finish, decorated by bands of cord impressions.
  - Time period: Prehistoric.
  - Cultural affiliation: Late Woodland.

==== Other artifacts ====
Non-pottery artifacts recovered from the site included:

- Chipped stone artifacts - including projectile points, scrapers and knives (subdivided into variants based on manufacturing technique), drills (subdivided into variants based on manufacturing technique) and percussion-flaked core tools. Of the projectile points, the most numerous category was the small triangular Madison point.
- Ground stone artifacts - including arrow shaft straighteners, manos, hammerstones, celts, abraders and an adze.
- Bone and antler artifacts - including beaver-tooth chisels, deer toe projectile points, beamers, awls (including ulna, metapodial, scapula, spatulate, bird bone, flat splinter and spindle), a deer mandible sheller, a scapula scraper, bone ornaments, a roulette possibly made from a fish bone (a distinctive artifact also noted at the Zimmerman and Plum Island sites in Illinois), bone punches, antler punches, misc. antler point implements and misc. cut antler pieces.
- Shell artifacts - including a notched shell and a pendant.
- Copper - one awl
- Pipes - micmac pipes, calumets and an equal-arm elbow pipe.
- Pot sherd artifacts - there were several pottery discs formed by the working of a broken pot into disks. 15 discs were found with perforations in the center and were possibly used as a spindle whorl. One disk was notched, and 2 discs were plain. In addition, there was a potsherd fragment that was thought to be a clay scraping tool used in smoothing the surface of a pot prior to firing in the kiln.
- European trade goods - including a glass bead, iron ax, iron awl, sheet brass fragments, a gunflint and brass wires. In addition, there were much more numerous artifacts collected on the surface prior to excavation by professional archaeologists.

=== Components ===
==== Carcajou component (Oneota, Koshkonong focus) ====
The Carcajou Component is the prehistoric Upper Mississippian Oneota occupation present at Carcajou Point. The diagnostic artifact of this occupation is the Oneota shell-tempered pottery, which is decorated with curvilinear motifs suggestive of the pottery from the Middle Mississippian Aztalan and Cahokia sites. The timeframe of this occupation is radiocarbon-dated by 3 dates ranging from A.D. 998-A.D. 1528. Hall felt that this occupation was probably the ancestors of the Historic Ho-Chunk tribe.

==== White Crow component (Historic, Ho-Chunk) ====
The White Crow component refers to the Historic Ho-Chunk village that existed from approximately A.D. 1728-A.D. 1828. This component was separated from the prehistoric component by approximately 200 years. It consists of several features with historic European trade goods in association with shell-tempered pottery.

== Significance ==
The pottery at Carcajou Point helped to provide some detail to the Oneota cultural identity. The distinctive curvilinear decorations on the shell-tempered pottery indicated a clear influence to local Middle Mississippian sites and was used by Hall to define the Koshkonong Focus of the Oneota Aspect. The radiocarbon dates obtained from the site were the first in the region, and helped archaeologists provide a chronology for the Oneota culture.
