= Mero site =

Archaeological site in Wisconsin, United States

- View of the Mero site

- Location in Wisconsin Location in United States
- 45°08′24″N 87°03′00″W
- Location: in the town of Liberty Grove in Door County, Wisconsin

The Mero site is a stratified, multicomponent prehistoric site located on the south side of Marshall's Point on the Door Peninsula in Door County, Wisconsin. It was excavated in 1960 by Ronald and Carol Mason under the auspices of the Neville Public Museum in Green Bay, Wisconsin, with financial backing from the landowner, Peter Mero.

As of 2016, Marshall's Point is a gated residential community. The privately owned interior of the community is recognized as a Wisconsin State Natural Area.

== Results of data analysis ==
Excavations at the site yielded Prehistoric artifacts and animal bone.

Three stratified areas were identified at the site:

- Stratified Area I – cultural deposits from this area dated from the Middle Woodland period and are designated North Bay I Complex. Artifacts and animal bone were recovered from a buried beach area, and another stratigraphic layer underneath the beach. Late Woodland and Upper Mississippian cultural remains came from the top levels.
- Stratified Areas II and III – cultural deposits from the lower strata of these areas are designated North Bay II Complex, and the top levels correspond to Late Woodland and Upper Mississippian. Stratigraphic layers were consistent between these two areas but could not be matched with the layers in Stratified Area I.

Additional material from all time periods was also plentiful in the unstratified portions of the site.

=== Components ===
Several Prehistoric components were present at the site:

- Middle Woodland – dates to approximately 200 B.C. to A.D. 500 and is characterized by the North Bay I and North Bay II Complexes. The diagnostic artifact is the grit-tempered pottery that is described as very heavily tempered and poorly constructed with rough surface in North Bay I and somewhat smoother and more moderately tempered in North Bay II. Both North Bay I and II have close affinities to the Middle Woodland Hopewell culture.
- Late Woodland – dates to approximately A.D. 500-1000 and is characterized mainly by Heins Creek Ware pottery, named after the nearby Heins Creek Site also in Door County, Wisconsin, along with other regional Late Woodland pottery types such as Point Sauble Collared and Madison Cord-Impressed. It is thought that the Heins Creek Ware evolved out of the Middle Woodland North Bay Complex. The Madison Cord-Impressed is affiliated with the Late Woodland Effigy Mound culture. A radiocarbon date of A.D. 720 was obtained from the Late Woodland deposits at the Heins Creek site and based upon the similarity of pottery between the two sites, that probably dates the Late Woodland component at Mero as well.
- Upper Mississippian – dates from approximately A.D. 1200-1400 (based upon stratigraphic position and the traits observed on the artifacts) and is the largest component at the site. The characteristic artifact is Oneota pottery. Unlike other Oneota components in the American Midwest, more of the pottery is grit-tempered (about 40%) than shell-tempered, rarely has handles, and is rarely decorated. The stratified sequence demonstrates that the incidence of grit temper decreases over time and is replaced by shell temper in the upper strata. Other typical Oneota traits such as arrow shaft straighteners, sherd discs, smoking pipes, storage pits and evidence of agriculture, are not present at Mero. The component was designated “Mero Complex” (aka Green Bay phase) by Mason, and is considered to have close affinities to the Grand River focus.

=== Animal remains ===
Remains from several species were recovered from the site. The main species present were deer, beaver, porcupine, dog, bear, otter, fish (esp. sturgeon, channel catfish, and smallmouth bass), marten, common loon, fisher and mink. These remains were not modified into tools like the bone tools described in the Artifacts section below, and may be considered food remains or, in the case of the dog and bear, possibly the remains of ceremonial activities. Dog sacrifice and dog meat consumption was observed to have ceremonial and religious implications in early Native American tribes. Bear worship and ceremonialism has also been recorded in the ethnological record.

=== Artifacts ===
Representative Oneota vessel forms

==== Pottery artifacts ====
No whole or reconstructable vessels were recovered from the site, so the analysis was based upon examination of rim and body sherds. Due to the large number of very small sherds, an effort was made to convert a raw sherd count into an estimated minimum number of vessels present. This provided a more accurate estimate of the relative proportions of pottery types represented.

11,835 sherds overall were recovered, representing a minimum of 501 vessels. Within the North Bay I and II Complexes, there were 951 sherds representing 59 vessels. For the Late Woodland, there were 2,256 sherds representing 111 vessels. The Upper Mississippian component had 8,628 sherds (of which only 146 were decorated) representing 331 vessels (205 shell-tempered and 126 grit-tempered).

Several pottery types from different time periods were present. Some of them are listed below:

Type	No. of vessels	Tempering Material	Description	Cultural affiliation
North Bay cordmarked (North Bay I and II complex)	3	Grit	Cordmarked to smoothed-over cordmarked surface finish; vertical rim profile; flat to rounded lip; no decoration	Middle Woodland
North Bay plain (North Bay I and II complex)	9	Grit	Plain surface; vertical rim profile; no decoration except for lip; lip may be plain or impressed with cord-wrapped object	Middle Woodland
North Bay dentate stamped (North Bay II complex)	7	Grit	Plain surface w/dentate-stamped decoration; rim profile vertical to slightly everted	Middle Woodland
Becker punctated (North Bay I complex)	8	Grit	Plain surface w/punctate decoration; vertical rim profile	Middle Woodland
Dane incised	5	Grit	Cordmarked surface w/incised decoration	Early to Middle Woodland
Heins Creek cordmarked	15	Grit	Cordmarked surface; no decoration except rarely on lip; globular vessel form with restricted orifice and vertical to slightly everted rim profile	Late Woodland
Heins Creek corded-stamped	23	Grit	Surface decorated with discontinuous stamped patterns applied with cord-wrapped stick; globular vessel form with restricted orifice and vertical to slightly everted rim profile	Late Woodland
Heins Creek cord-wrapped stick	5	Grit	Surface decorated with cord-wrapped stick impressions; globular vessel form with restricted orifice and everted rim profile	Late Woodland
Point Sauble collared	21	Grit	Cord-impressed surface, collared rim, row of punctates beneath collar	Late Woodland
Aztalan collared	4	Grit	Collar and lip decorated w/twisted cord impressions; vessel body below collar is cordmarked; mouth of vessel is angular	Late Woodland
Madison cord-impressed	24	Grit	Cord-impressed decoration (subdivided into 4 varieties); globular vessel form with restricted orifice and slightly everted rim profile	Late Woodland
Oneota	331	Grit or shell	Predominantly plain surfaces, mostly undecorated; decorations when they occur consist of incised or trailed lines sometimes associated with punctates or embossed stamps; lips sometimes notched; handles are rare; most vessel forms are globular jars with restricted orifice and sharply everted rim profile; there are also shallow bowl forms represented	Upper Mississippian

==== Other artifacts ====
Non-pottery artifacts recovered from the site included:

- Chipped stone artifacts – including 118 projectile points, scrapers (subdivided into variants based on manufacturing technique), 82 blanks, 4 knives, 8 drills, one spokeshave and one hand axe. Of the projectile points, 78 were triangular points and 40 were stemmed and notched.
- Ground stone artifacts – including 4 hammerstones, 12 net sinkers and 3 celts.
- Bone and antler artifacts – including 20 split bone awls, 5 deer ulna awls, 4 drifts, 1 decorated/grooved awl, 1 socketed antler projectile point, 1 socketed deer metapodial projectile point, 5 mat needles, 5 counters, 11 hair pins and 2 tooth pendants (one dog and one bear).
- Copper artifacts – including 1 awl and 1 tanged spatulate knife.

== Significance ==
The cultural sequence at the Mero site reveals a long series of occupations from 500 B.C. to A.D. 1400, or almost 2,000 years. The pottery record indicates an in situ evolution from the Middle Woodland North Bay culture to the Late Woodland Heins Creek culture; but after A.D. 1000 there is an intrusive Upper Mississippian presence characterized by Oneota pottery.

The Oneota Mero Complex (aka Green Bay focus) is unique due to its high proportion of grit-tempered pottery and the low incidence of decoration. It is also unique that the site does not have many of the traits usually found in Oneota contexts such as arrow shaft straighteners, smoking pipes, sherd discs, storage pits or evidence of agriculture. The reason may be that the site was not a village but rather a temporary site for a specialized activity such as fishing.
