= Palos site =

Archaeological site in Illinois, United States

Palos Site
- Location in Illinois Location in United States
- 41°45′00″N 87°41′00″W
- Location: on the Cal-Sag Channel in Cook County near Chicago, Illinois

Site notes
- Area: 5 acres (2.0 ha)

The Palos site (Ck-26) is located on the Cal-Sag Canal in Cook County, Illinois, United States, near the city of Chicago. It is classified as a Protohistoric to early Historic site with Upper Mississippian affiliation.

== History of archaeological investigations ==
The site was excavated under the auspices of the Chicago Field Museum of Natural History by Cheryl Ann Munson and Patrick J. Munson as part of a six-week Anthropology Training Program for high aptitude high school students.

== Results of data analysis ==
Excavations at the site yielded Protohistoric to early Historic artifacts, pit features, plant remains and animal bone.

=== Features ===
A total of 21 pit features and several scattered post molds were identified at the site. All of them contained ash, charcoal and fire-cracked rock. Most of them were shallow and basin shaped and the rest were deep with vertical sides and flat bottoms.

=== Animal remains ===
Remains from several species were recovered from the site. The main species present were deer and fish, but crayfish, mussels, birds, turtles and smaller mammals were also present. These remains were not modified into tools like the bone tools described in the Artifacts section below, and may be considered food remains.

=== Plant remains ===
Flotation techniques were used to recover small plant remains that would otherwise be missed during traditional archaeological activities. As a result, plant remains recovered included maize (5 cob fragments and one kernel), one common bean, two hazelnut fragments and several seeds of Carex, and either Chenopodium or Amaranthus. Both Chenopodium and Amaranthus are part of the Eastern Agricultural Complex.

=== Artifacts ===
Artifacts recovered from the site included:

Pottery from the Palos Site

- Pottery – total of 524 pot sherds were recovered, mostly in very poor preservation. Only 4 vessels could be identified via usable rim sherds. 16 cordmarked grit-tempered body sherds were thought to represent Langford Ware, which is an Upper Mississippian culture based in northwestern Illinois. The vast majority of sherds were shell-tempered and seemed to be affiliated with the Upper Mississippian Huber culture. Of the four vessels, three conformed to the definition of Huber ware and one seemed to be a trade vessel affiliated with the Danner series identified at the Zimmerman site.
- Stone tools – including 18 small triangular projectile points, 5 end scrapers, 9 flake scrapers, 6 humpback scrapers, and 2 ovate knives. The triangular points are commonly called Madison points. These types of points, also known as "arrowheads", are thought to be arrow-tips for bows-and-arrows. The usage of the bow-and-arrow seems to have greatly increased from c. A.D. 1000 on, possibly due to increased conflict.
- Bone and antler tools – including a long deer-bone awl, an awl fragment, an antler projectile point and 4 cylindrical "gaming pieces"
- European trade goods – including a copper or brass tinkler fragment, two sheet brass fragments, brass ring fragment and another unidentified brass fragment.

== Significance ==
The Palos site yielded a small amount of artifacts but most importantly, it has yielded Upper Mississippian pottery in association with early Historic European trade goods. Based on the known dates of introduction of the artifacts, the excavators estimate that the date of occupation for this site is between 1673 and 1693.
