= Doughnut Formation =

Geologic formation in the United States

The Doughnut Formation is an Upper Mississippian geologic unit in the western United States. Fish fossils have been discovered in shale outcrops of this formation in Dinosaur National Monument.
