= Metapodial =

Bones which connect the digits to the lower leg bones

Metapodials are long bones of the hand (metacarpals) and feet (metatarsals) which connect the digits to the lower leg bones. In humans, five are present in each hand and foot. In quadrupeds, these form the lower limb, rather than being part of the extremity, thus what looks to be the elbow of a sheep is actually the wrist.
