= Adornment =

Accessory or ornament worn to enhance the beauty or status of the wearer

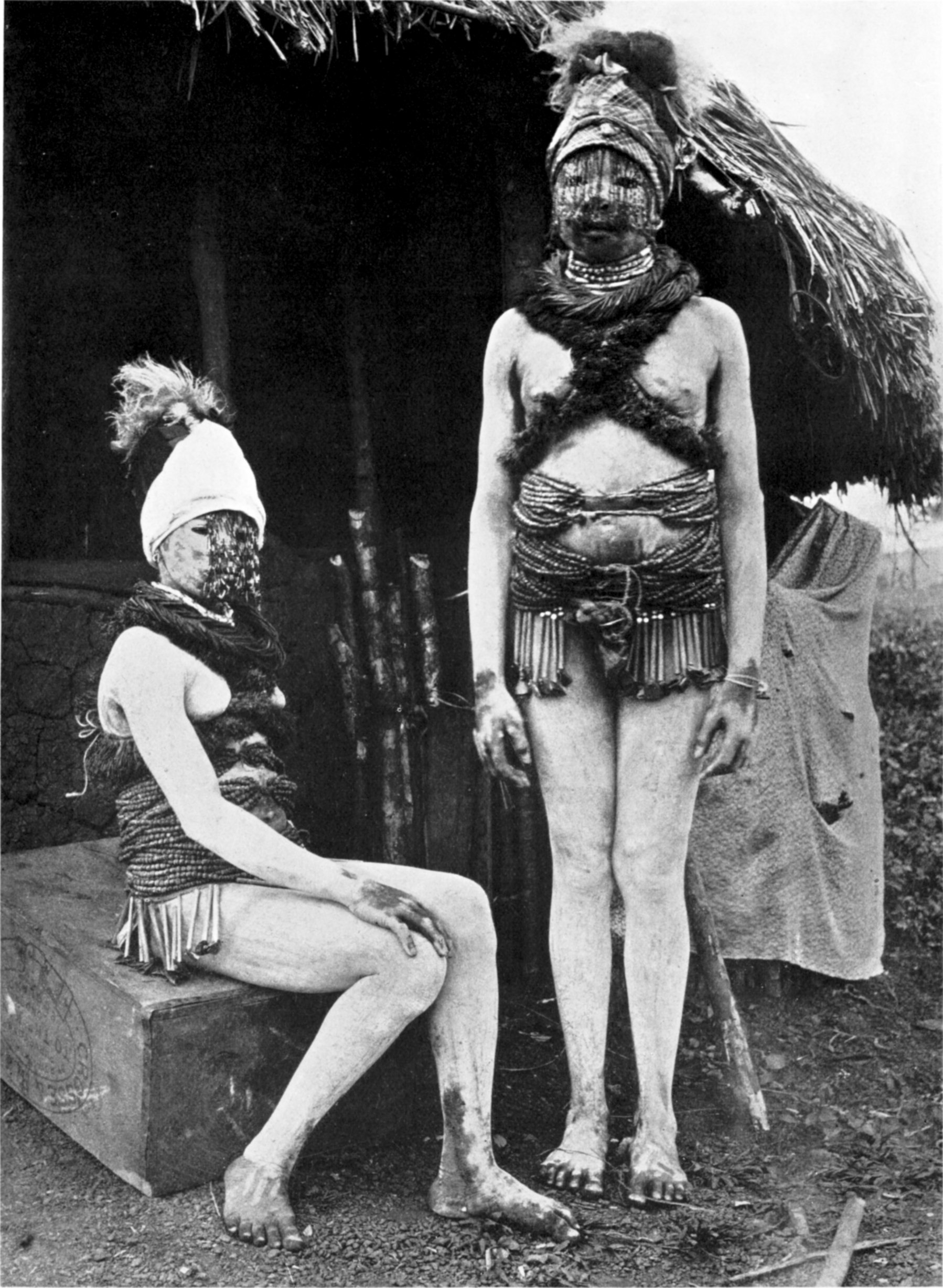
The principal adornment of these girls from the Bundu tribe in Sierra Leone is the adornment of bodies and faces with markings produced by the smearing on by the fingers of a substance called "wojeh", composed of white clay and animal fat.

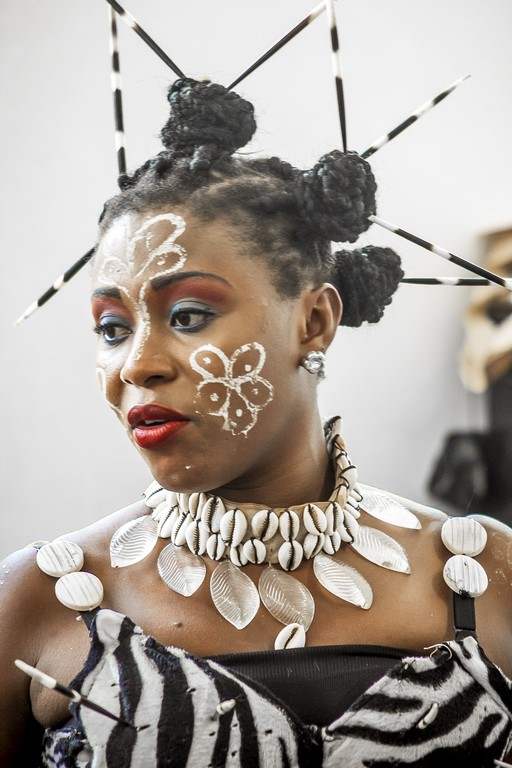
Calabar adornments Bird Feather stalks

An adornment is generally an accessory or ornament worn to enhance the beauty or status of the wearer. They are often worn to embellish, enhance, or distinguish the wearer, and to define cultural, social, or religious status within a specific community. When worn to show economic status, the items are often either rare or prohibitively expensive to others. Adornments are usually colourful, and worn to attract attention.

They have a long history around the world, from feathers or bone to modern accessories such as jewellery. Items of adornment are also used by warriors, and by other members of the military to show rank or achievement.

== Items of adornment ==
These include cosmetics, jewellery, clothing accessories, facial hair, fingernail modification, piercing, lip plates, tattooing, braiding, and headgear.

== Cultures, subcultures, and institutions ==
Groups who practice adornment include the yakuza, military, religious institutions, tribal groups, and the punk culture. Items of adornment can provide information about a person's rank, social status, gender role, area of origin, etc. An example would be the beaded jewelry worn by the Maasai tribe, which is very specific to them and some related tribes.

In Islamic culture, adornments have included caps such as the kufi and taqiyah for men, and the hijab for women.

== Images ==
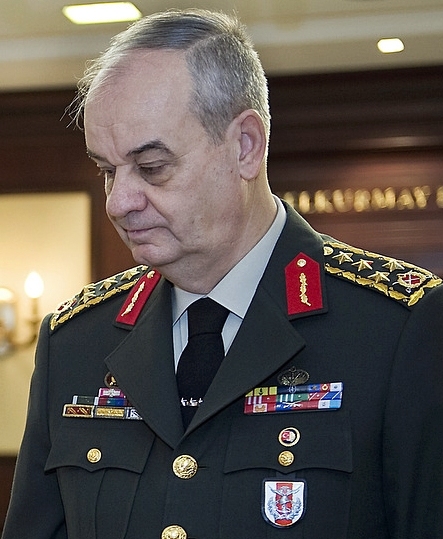
A heavily adorned general

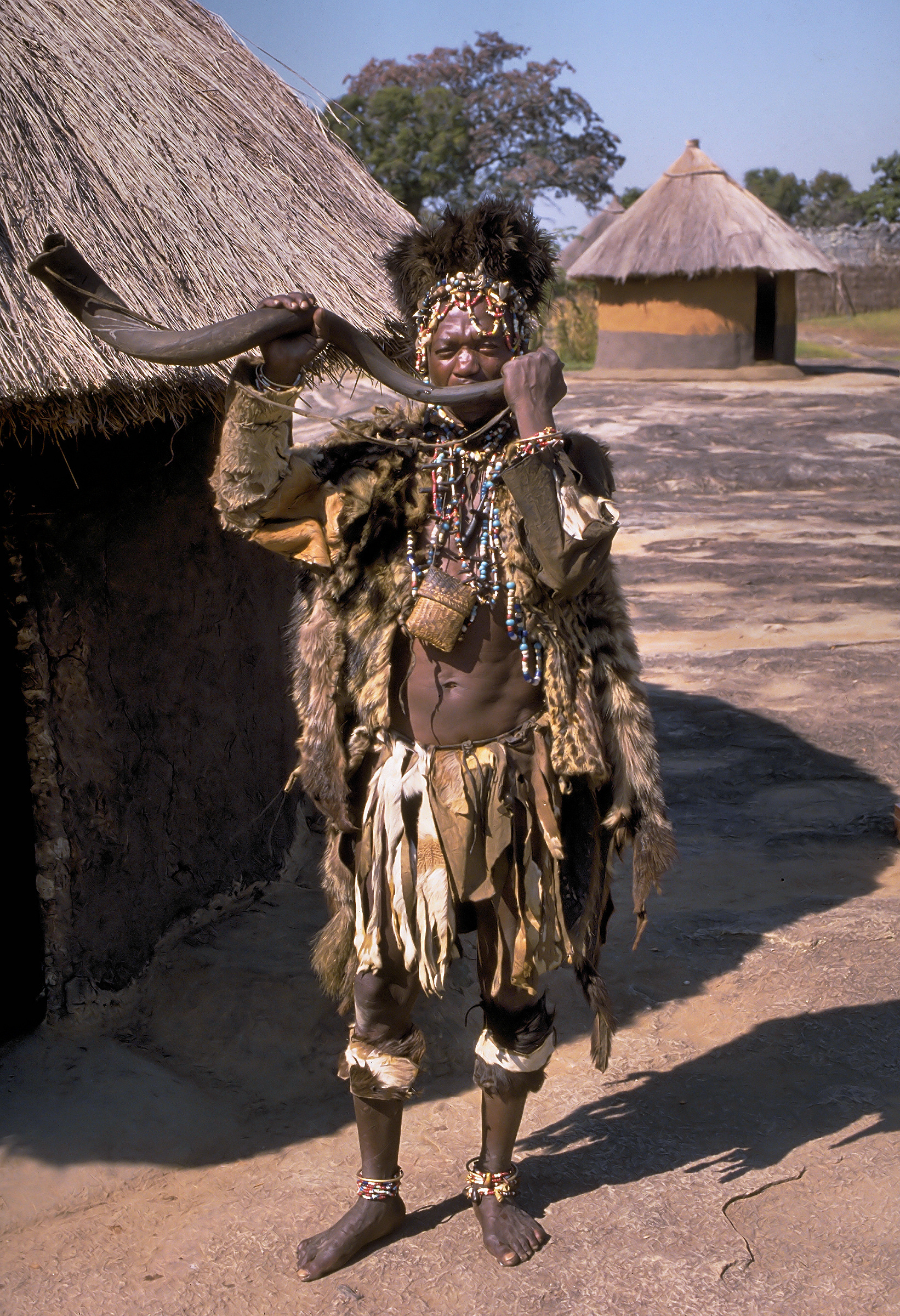
A Shona witch doctor wearing skins and beads

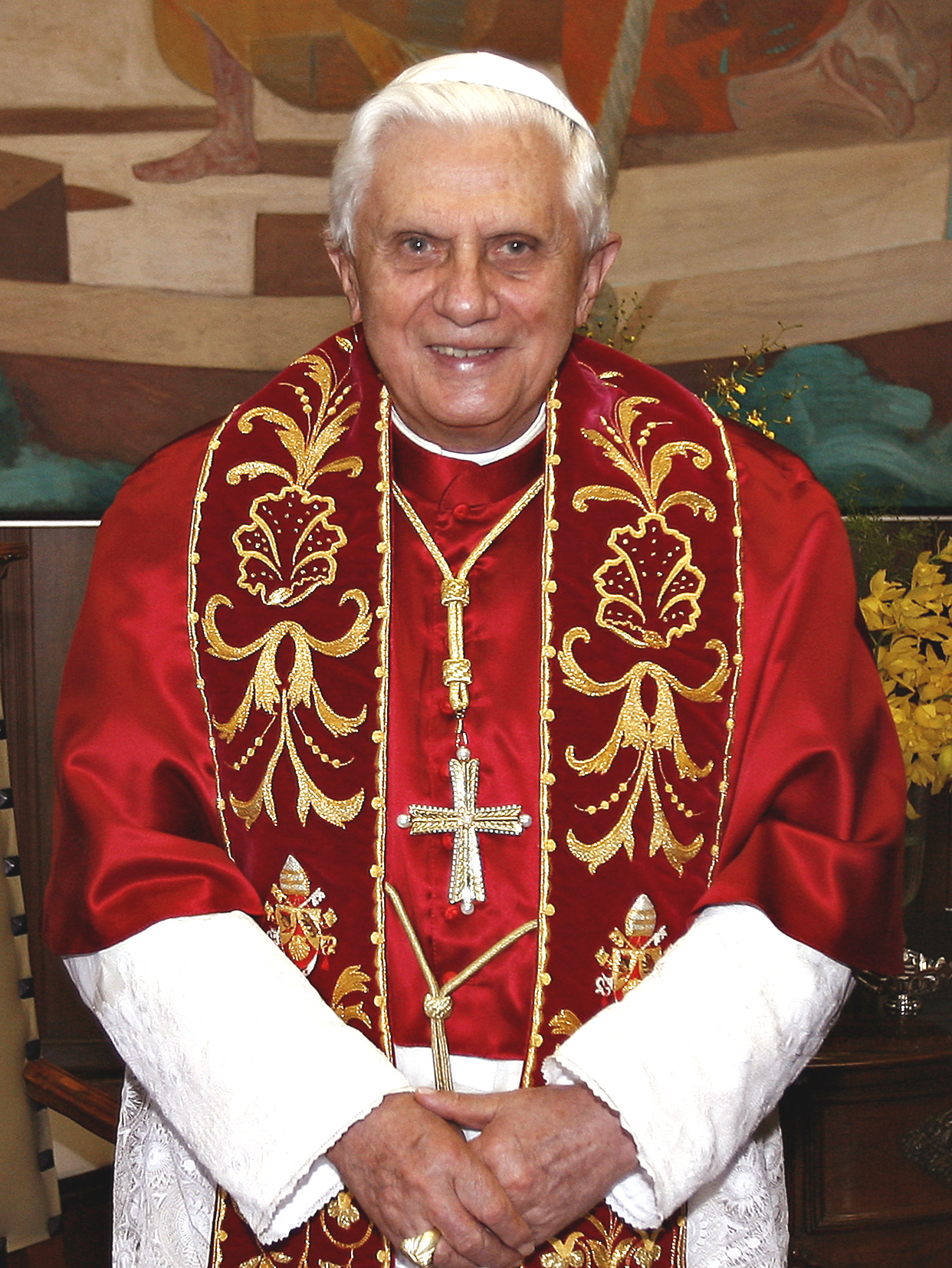
Pope Benedict XVI

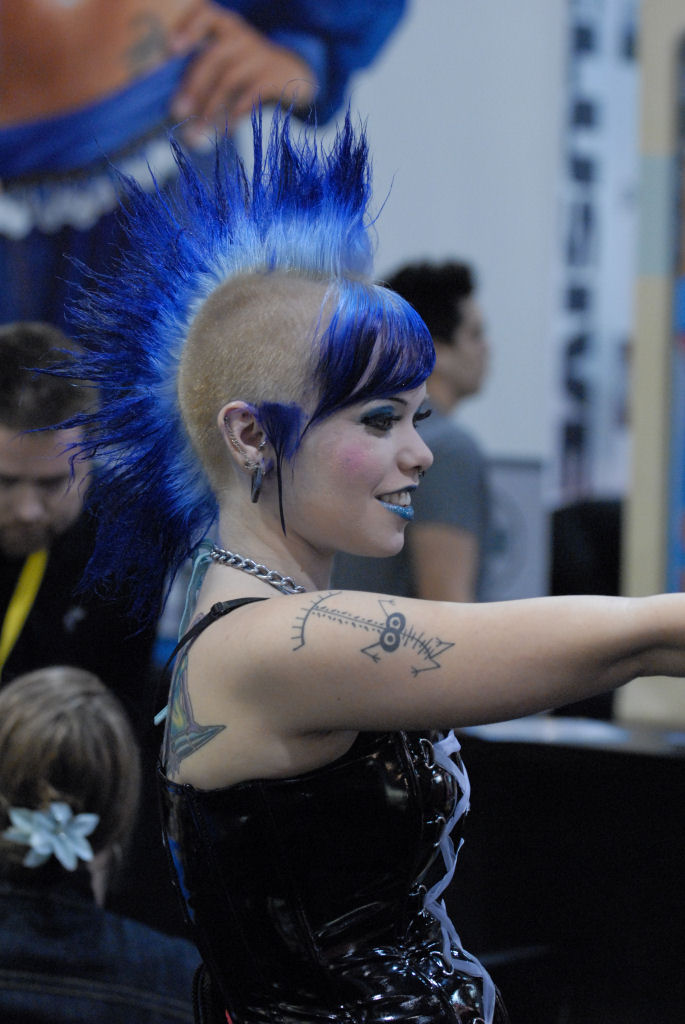
Punk adornment

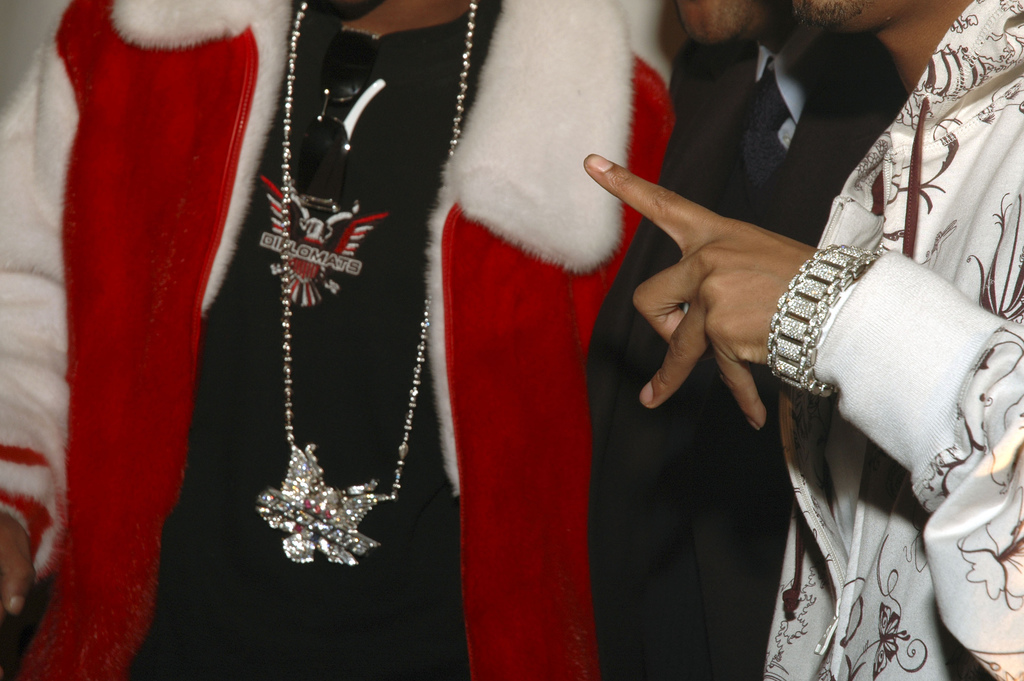
A modern example of adornment: Bling-bling

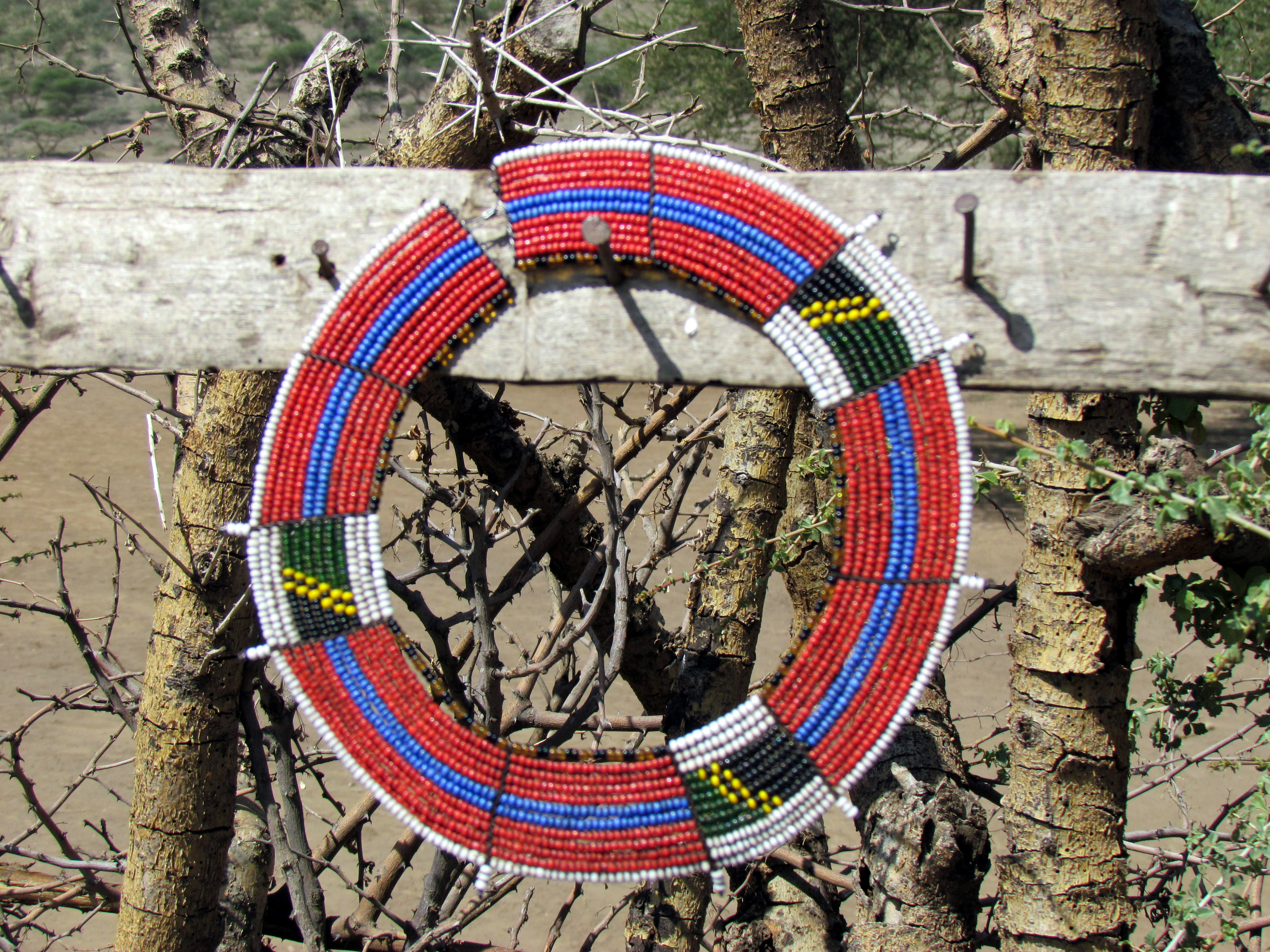
Maasai beaded jewelry

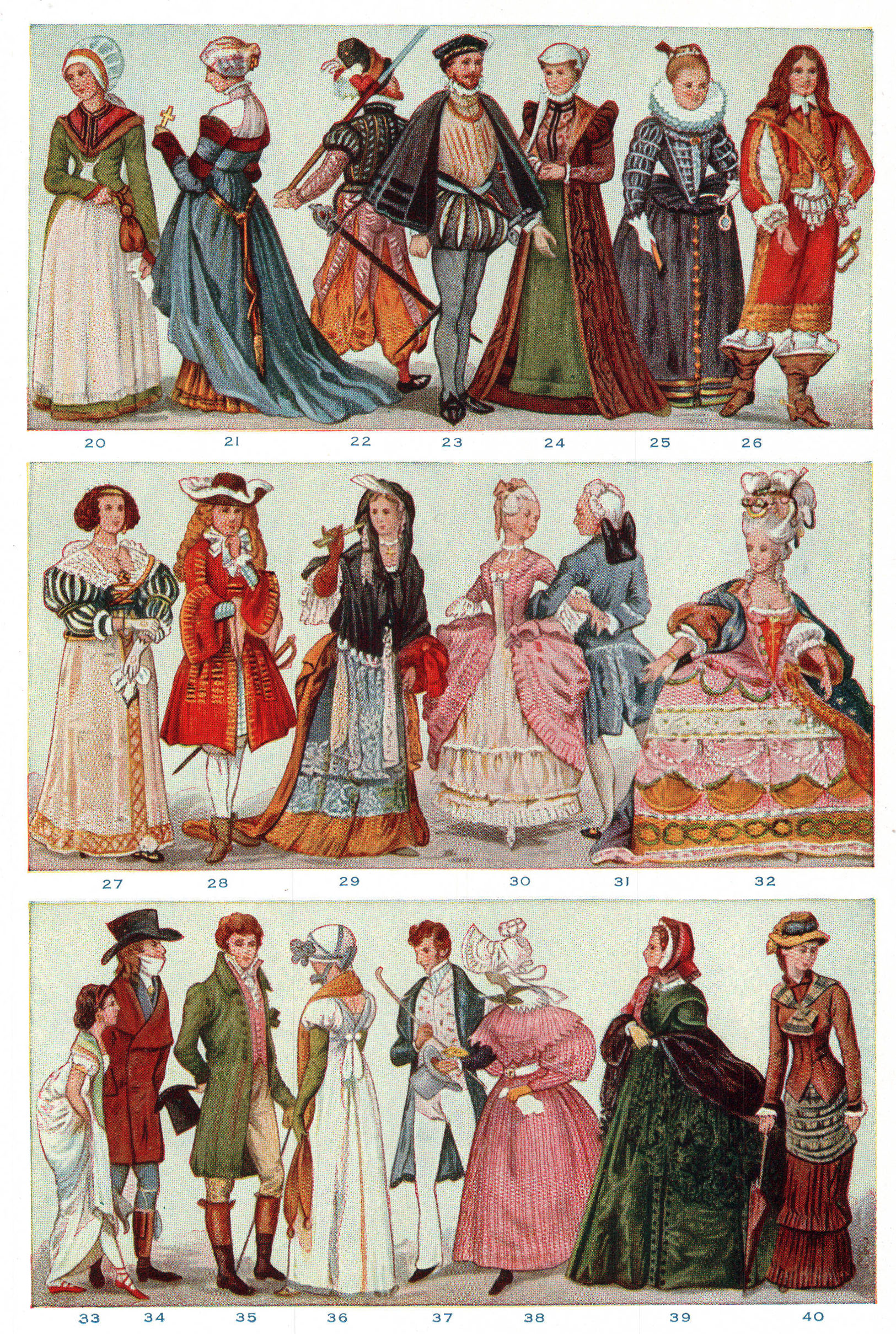
Examples of social attire, a form of adornment, from the European Renaissance through the 19th Century

== See also ==
- Fashion accessory
- Permanent jewellery
- Body modification
- Native American jewelry
