= Feature (archaeology) =

Term defining human-built architecture

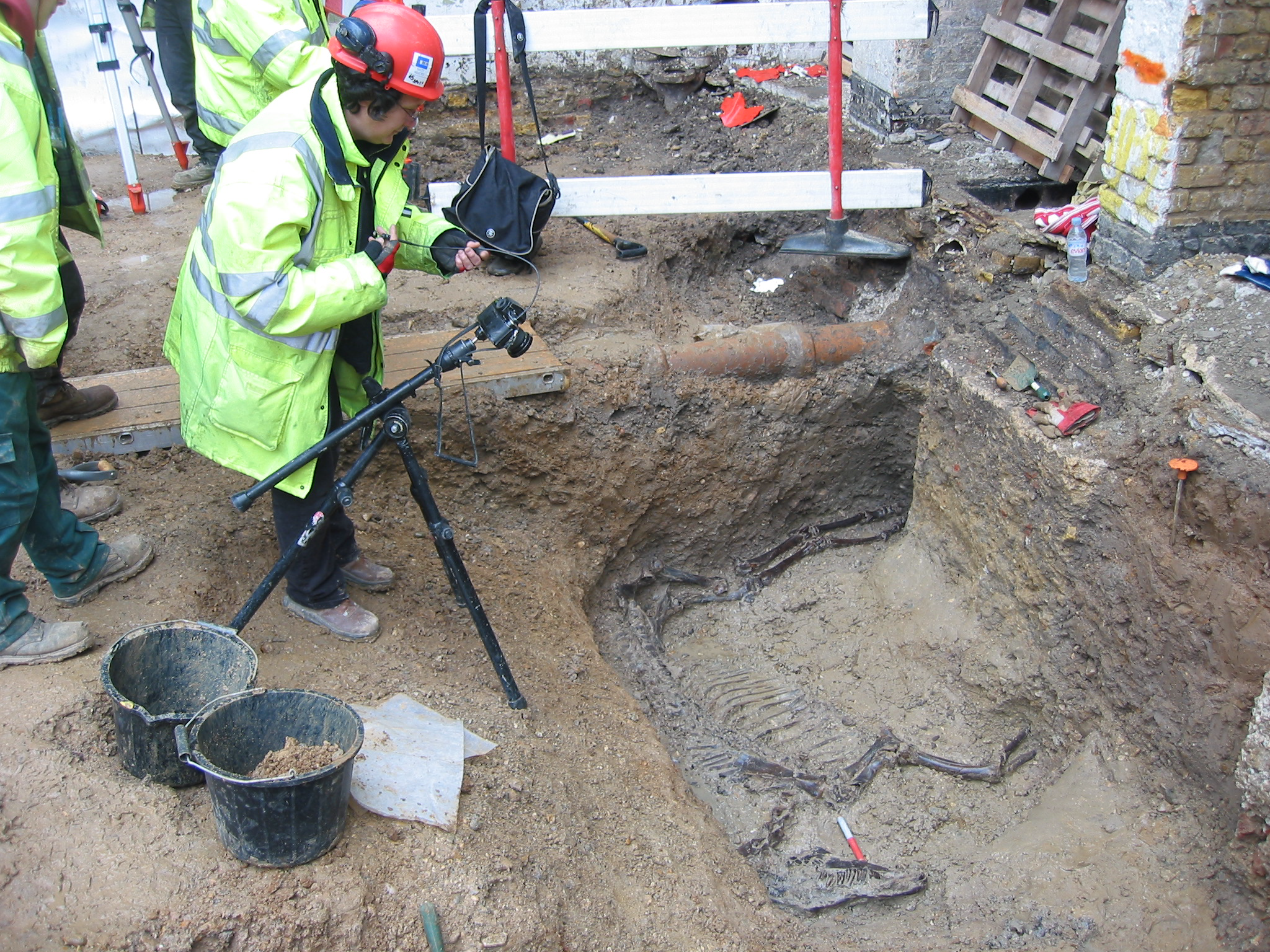
A photographer taking a record shot of a horse burial in a Roman ditch re-cut. A re-cut is a type of feature.

In archaeological excavation, a feature is a collection of one or more contexts representing some human non-portable activity, such as a hearth or wall. Features serve as an indication that the area in which they are found has been interfered with in the past, usually by humans.

Features are distinguished from artifacts in that they cannot be separated from their location without changing their form. Artifacts are portable, while features are non-portable. Artifacts and features can both be made from any available material, with the primary distinction being portability.

Features and artifacts differ from ecofacts. Ecofacts are natural remains, such as plants and animals.

== Background ==
Features have a specific stratigraphic context as well as helping to provide details of context for artifacts. Often times an artifact's provenience can be defined in part by the feature it is associated with (if such a feature exists). In circumstances where a stratigraphic layer cannot be defined by soil color or consistency, such as in the excavation of several features such as wells or cisterns, arbitrary layers can be defined by an archaeologist based on equal levels of depth, allowing for the categorization of artifacts based on relative placement within a feature.

== Types ==
Features are categorized by the time period, as either historic or prehistoric. Prehistoric archaeology refers to the time in history before human life was recorded or documented, while historic archaeology refers to the time period where there was a documented human past.

In relation to site stratigraphy, features generally have a vertical characteristic, such as pits, walls, or ditches. On the contrary, elements that have horizontal characteristic, such as a layer, dump, or surface, is not a feature. General horizontal elements are part of the stratigraphic sequence. Features tend to have an intrusive characteristic or associated cuts. This is not definitive as surfaces can be referred to as features of a building and free standing structures with no construction cut can still be features. Middens (dump deposits) are also referred to as features due to their discrete boundaries. This is seen in comparison to leveling dumps, which stretch out over a substantial portion of a site. The concept of a feature is, to a certain degree, abstract, as it will change depending on the scale of excavation.

== Examples ==
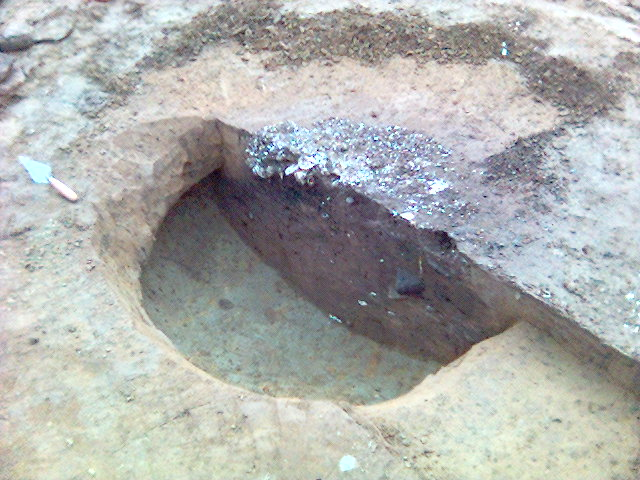
A saxon pit, another type of feature

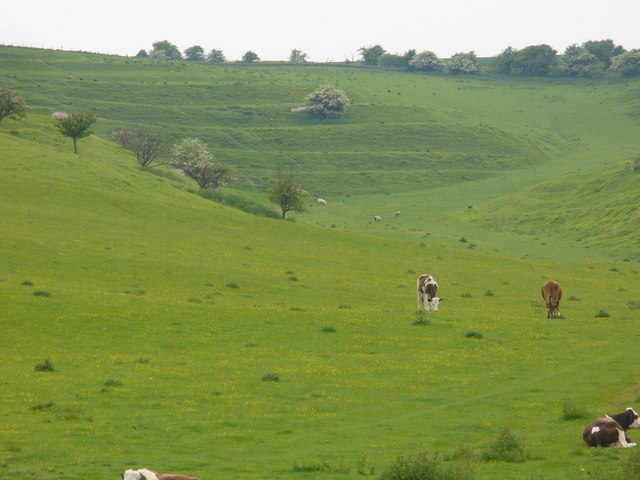
A lynchet is a type of archaeological feature. They are terraces formed on the side of a hill.

Features specific to certain architecture types or eras such as trilithon for the purposes of this article are not considered generic. Generic features are feature types that can come from a broad section in time of the archaeological record if not all of it. Generic types can include:

1. Cuts
2. Re-cuts
3. Pits
4. Post holes
5. Stake holes
6. Construction cuts
7. Robber trenches
8. Walls
9. Foundations
10. Ditches
11. Drains
12. Wells
13. Cisterns
14. Hearths
15. Stairs and steps
16. Enclosures
17. Lynchets
18. Graves
19. Burials
20. Middens
21. Pit-houses
22. Fire pits

== See also ==
- Archaeological association
- Archaeological context
- Archaeological field survey
- Archaeological plan
- Archaeological section
- Cut (archaeology)
- Excavation
- Fill (archaeology)
- Harris matrix
- Relationship (archaeology)
- Single context recording
