= Stitching awl =

Tool for making or enlarging holes in fabric or leather

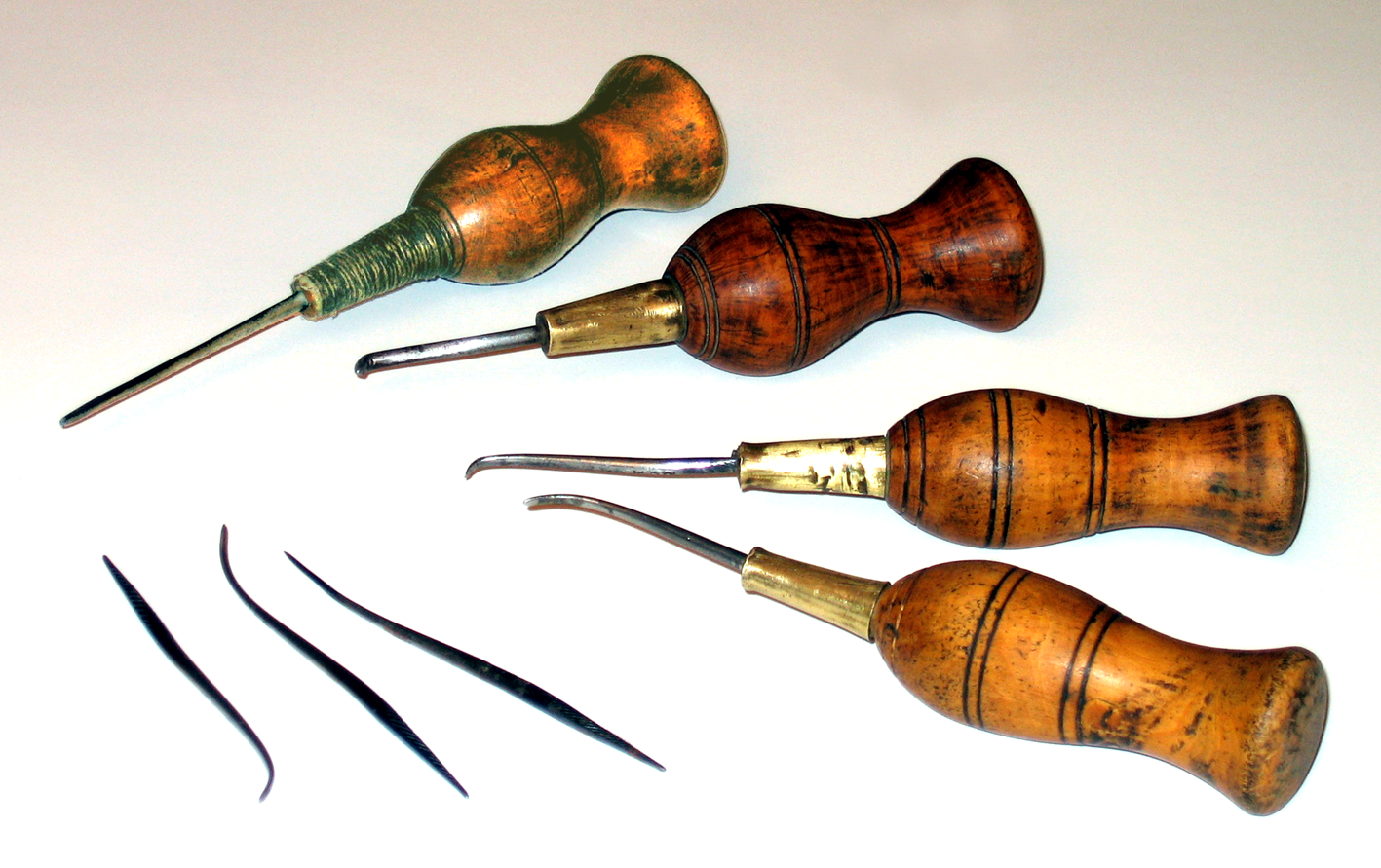
Shoemaking awls

A stitching awl is a tool that can puncture new holes or enlarge existing holes in a variety of materials. It is also used for sewing heavy materials, such as leather or canvas. It is a thin, tapered metal shaft, coming to a sharp point, either straight or slightly bent. These shafts are often in the form of interchangeable needles.

Awls usually have an eye piercing at the pointed end to aid in drawing thread through holes for the purpose of manual lockstitch sewing, in which case it is also called a sewing awl. Stitching awls are frequently used by shoe repairers and other leatherworkers.

When sewing awls are used to make lock stitches, thread is first pushed through the eye piercing. The needle, with the thread in the eye, is then pushed through the material. The thread is then pulled through the eye to extend it. As the needle is pushed through the material, the extra thread from the first stitch is then threaded through the loops of successive stitches creating a lock stitch. The action is likened to that of a "miniature sewing machine". Styles may vary, as they are adapted to specific trades, such as making shoes or saddles. They are also used in the printing trades to aid in setting movable type and in bookbinding.

== History ==
A small copper awl from a Tel Tsaf grave in Israel is currently the oldest (circa 5100 BCE) metal object discovered in the Middle East.

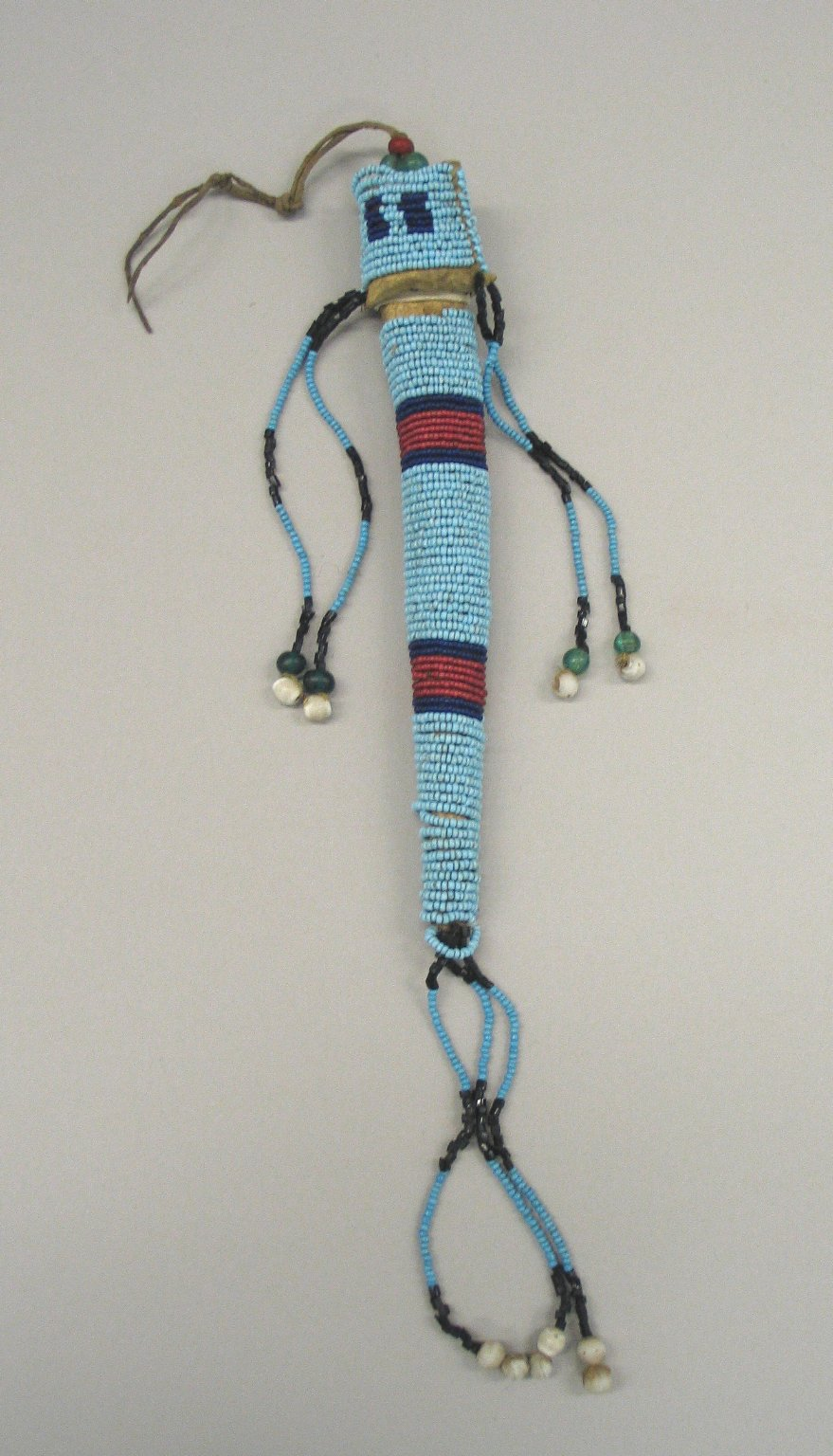
Native American, Plains, Northern. Awl Case, Brooklyn Museum

Awls were used by the Eastern and Middle Dakota (Sioux) and by the peoples of the Red River region, including the Red River Métis, Anishinabe, Plains Cree, and Salteaux.

In terms of nomenclature, French Canadian fur traders in the late 18th or early 19th century called one band of the Interior Salish peoples of the American Northwest Coeur d'Alene, meaning "heart of an awl", in reference to their savvy in trading. British traders and later colonists adopted the French term for the people, which eventually became the official name of the tribe.

When he was a child, Louis Braille gouged his eye with an awl by accident. One eye was destroyed instantly, and a subsequent infection later claimed the other eye, making him blind by the time he was four. The accident spurred Braille to the invention of the Braille alphabet, the prototype of which was created using an awl.

== See also ==
- Bradawl
- Coeur d'Alene, Idaho
- Scratch awl
