= Temper (pottery) =

Prevents shrinkage and cracking of clay

A temper is a non-plastic material added to clay to prevent shrinkage and cracking during drying and firing of vessels made from the clay. Tempers may include:

- Bone;
- Chaff;
- Charcoal;
- Ground schist;
- Wood ash;
- Grit;
- Sand or crushed sandstone;
- Crushed limestone;
- Crushed igneous rocks, such as volcanic rock, feldspar, or mica;
- Grog;
- Plant fiber;
- Horse manure (dried and sifted);
- Crushed mollusc shells (including fossilized) (see Shell tempering in the Mississippian culture); and
- Freshwater sponge spicules.

Some clays used to make pottery do not require the addition of tempers. Pure kaolin clay does not require tempering. Some clays are self-tempered, that is, naturally contain enough mica, sand, or sponge spicules that they do not require additional tempering.

== See also ==
Ceramic#Archaeology
