= Utica =

Utica may refer to:

== Places ==
- Utica, Tunisia, ancient city founded by Phoenicians
- Útica, a village in Cundinamarca, Colombia
- Port Perry/Utica Field Aerodrome, Canada

=== United States ===
- Utica, New York
- Little Utica, New York, northwest of Syracuse, NY
- Utica Mansion, in Angels Camp, California
- North Utica, Illinois, usually called "Utica, Illinois"
  - Utica Bridge
  - Utica station (Illinois)
- Utica Township, LaSalle County, Illinois
- Utica, Indiana
  - Utica Township, Clark County, Indiana
- Utica Township, Chickasaw County, Iowa
- Utica, Kansas
- Utica, Kentucky
- Utica, Maryland
- Utica, Michigan
- Utica, Minnesota
- Utica Township, Winona County, Minnesota
- Utica, Mississippi
- Utica, Missouri
- Utica, Montana
- Utica, Nebraska
- Utica, Ohio, in Licking County on the Knox County line
- Utica, Warren County, Ohio
- Utica, Oklahoma
- Utica Square, in Tulsa, Oklahoma
- Utica, Pennsylvania
- Utica, South Carolina
- Utica, South Dakota
- Utica, Texas, a ghost town in Smith County, Texas
- Utica, West Virginia
- Utica, Crawford County, Wisconsin, a town of which Fairview, Pine Knob, Rising Sun, and Towerville are a part
- Utica, Dane County, Wisconsin, a part of the town of Christiana
- Utica, Winnebago County, Wisconsin, a town of which Elo, Fisk, and Pickett are a part

== Gastronomy ==
- Utica greens, a dish
- Utica riggies, a dish
- Utica Club, a beer by Matt Brewing Company

== Media and arts ==
- Utica, an episode of the television series Rome
- Catone in Utica, an opera by Metastasio for Leonardo Vinci
- Utica Queen, a contestant on Season 13 of Rupaul's Drag Race

== Organizations ==
- Tunisian Confederation of Industry, Trade and Handicrafts, an employers' organization with acronym UTICA in French
- Utica University, formerly part of Syracuse University
- Utica Energy, fuel plant in Oshkosh, Wisconsin
- Hotel Utica, New York

== Science ==
- Utica, a genus of crabs in the family Varunidae
- Utica, a genus of butterflies in the family Lycaenidae; synonym of Theclinesthes
- Pseudohemihyalea utica, a moth
- Pheia utica, a moth
- Utica Shale, a rock layer of shale in the Appalachian Basin

== Other ==
- Dean v. Utica, a legal case
- ootheca, a type of egg capsule

== See also ==
- Utica Avenue (disambiguation)
- Utica Station (disambiguation)
- Utica Township (disambiguation)
