= Spring Valley House–Sulfur Springs Hotel =

- U.S. National Register of Historic Places
- U.S. Historic district
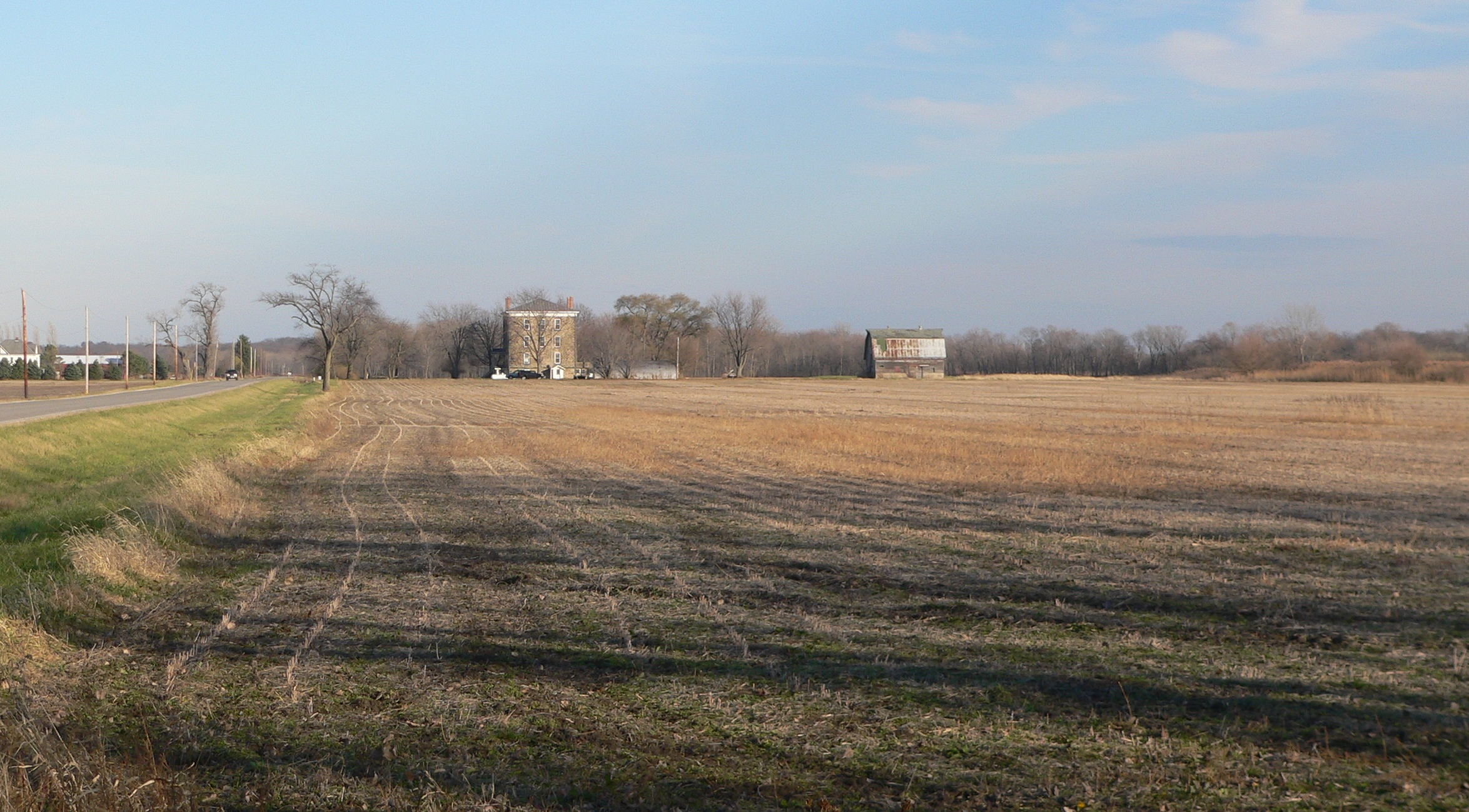
- Old Kaskaskia Village site, with the hotel in the background

- Location within Illinois Location within the United States
- Location: Dee Bennett Rd., Utica, Illinois
- Coordinates: 41°19′23″N 88°57′47″W
- Area: less than one acre
- Built: c. 1849
- NRHP reference No.: 87002055
- Added to NRHP: November 20, 1987

The Spring Valley House–Sulfur Springs Hotel is a historic former hotel located along Dee Bennett Road in rural Utica Township, LaSalle County, Illinois. Built circa 1849, the hotel is unusually large for a rural hotel of the area. The brick and limestone building, which features Greek Revival elements and vernacular stonework, is four stories tall and 63 by 42 feet (19 by 13 m) in area. Its size is likely a result of it serving two different audiences; due to its proximity to the Illinois River and a major stagecoach line, it hosted travelers passing through the area, but it also functioned as a resort destination due to the area's hot springs. Three such springs are located on the site of the hotel, one of which has a spring house built over it. The opening of the Chicago and Rock Island Railroad through the area doomed the hotel, as stagecoach and river travel declined dramatically, and it closed after 1862.

The hotel building was added to the National Register of Historic Places on November 20, 1987.
