= Utica Township =

Utica Township may refer to the following townships in the United States:

- Utica Township, LaSalle County, Illinois
- Utica Township, Clark County, Indiana
- Utica Township, Chickasaw County, Iowa
- Utica Township, Winona County, Minnesota
