= Grand Village of the Illinois =

Archaeological site in Illinois, United States

- Old Kaskaskia Village
- U.S. National Register of Historic Places
- U.S. National Historic Landmark
- Illinois State Historic Site
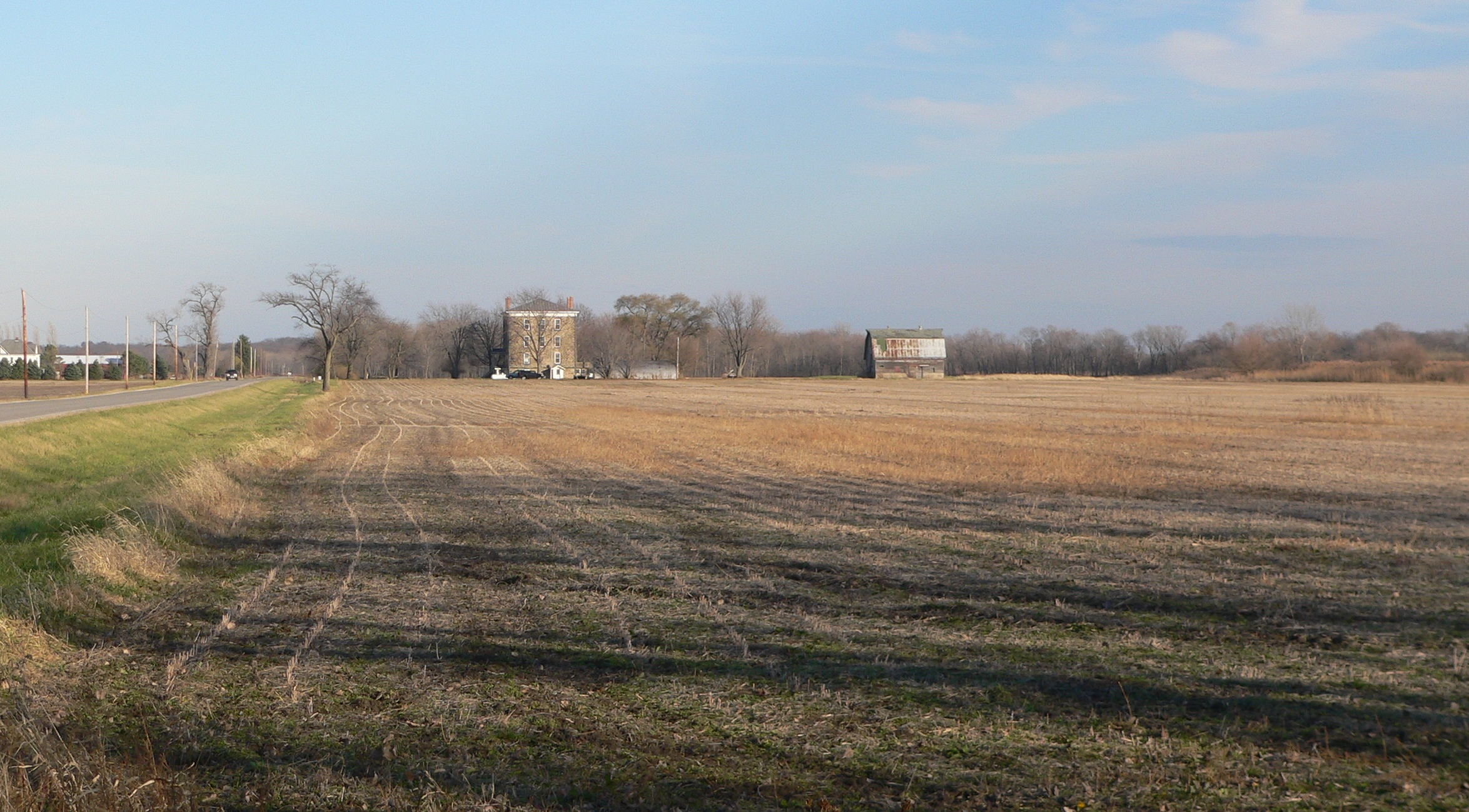
- Old Kaskaskia Village site, seen from the west. Now an archeology site, the village thrived in the late 1600s. In the background left of center is the 1849 Sulphur Springs Hotel. The Illinois River is about 1,000 feet (300 m) south (right) of the road at left.

- Location within Illinois Location within the United States
- Nearest city: Ottawa, Illinois
- Coordinates: 41°19′17″N 88°58′04″W
- Built: 1673
- NRHP reference No.: 66000324

Significant dates
- Added to NRHP: October 15, 1966
- Designated NHL: July 19, 1964

The Grand Village of the Illinois, also called Old Kaskaskia Village, is a site significant for being the best documented historic Native American village in the Illinois River valley. It was a large agricultural and trading village of Native Americans of the Illinois confederacy, located on the north bank of the Illinois River near the present town of Utica, Illinois. French explorers Louis Joliet and Father Jacques Marquette came across it in 1673. The Kaskaskia, a tribe of the Illiniwek people (and later, other Illiniwek tribes) lived in the village. It grew rapidly after a French mission and fur trading post (see, Illinois Country) were established there in 1675, to a population of about 6,000 people in about 460 houses. Around 1691 the Kaskaskia and other Illiniwek moved further south, abandoning the site due to pressure from an Iroquois invasion from the northeast.

The historic site is now owned by the U.S. state of Illinois. In the 1940s, historian Sarah Tucker of the University of Chicago was able to pinpoint the probable location of the village based on the historical record. The university and the Illinois State Museum conducted archaeological excavations and confirmed Tucker's research, finding substantial evidence of the village. The site was declared a National Historic Landmark in 1964.

A prominent local landmark, Starved Rock, stands on the south bank of the river directly opposite the Grand Village site. Explorer La Salle founded a fort there to be near this village. Starved Rock is also a National Historic Landmark and is included in Starved Rock State Park.

== History ==
Archeological evidence indicates that the Illini of the Grand Village were well adapted to their environment. They grew corn, beans, and squash in the rich alluvial soil. In 1673, Father Jacques Marquette and Louis Joliet visited the village, which at that time contained approximately 1,000 people. The French were returning from their expedition to chart the Mississippi River. Although terminally ill, Marquette returned to the Grand Village in early 1675 to celebrate Mass, and founded the mission of the Immaculate Conception of the Blessed Virgin. The French called the village both the Grand Village du Kaskaskia and La Vantum.

Around this time the town grew to perhaps the most populous Native American settlement north of Mexico. According to a theory by historian Robert Morrissey, the Illinois Confederation people were adept at exploiting their location in the ecotone between the forests of the east and the prairies of the west – a controlling point for trade between east and west, as well as, rich with diverse hunting, farming, and resource habitats.

The Native Americans of the Eastern Woodland culture were severely affected by epidemic infectious diseases brought to North America from Europe, as they had no natural immunity. In addition, the introduction of guns increased the fatalities in intertribal conflicts. The fur trade became a source of competition and conflict between tribes. Members of the Illini Confederacy appear to have responded to increasing pressures by banding together. Reports from La Salle and others in the 1680s indicate that the Grand Village of the Illini temporarily increased in size during that decade to 400 cabins housing as many as 6,000 people. This village proved to be unsustainable in size. La Salle and Henri de Tonti also established Fort Saint Louis on the butte now called Starved Rock across the river, where a village near the rock's base called Hotel Plaza developed.

The inhabitants of the Grand Village largely dispersed under pressure from invading Iroquois bands (see, Beaver Wars). Many likely moved to the regions around Peoria (see, Fort Pimiteoui), Cahokia, and Kaskaskia, Illinois. These three towns were named after constituent tribes of the Illinois Confederacy.

=== Alternative site hypothesis ===
A 2022 article argues the site of the Grand Village of the Illinois, as referred to by the early European explorers, was on the north side of the Sangamon River about 3 miles east of Chandlerville and that the site near Starved Rock was a seasonal farming village. (It also argues the lake referred to as Pimiteoui was not Peoria Lake but instead that near Beardstown and places Fort Crevecoeur near there as well.) References are made to the journals and maps of the explorers and to the original plats of Illinois drawn in the early 1800s, before the rivers had been altered. (The Sangamon has since been channeled.)

Included was La Salle's description of the Grand Village. It was nearly 3 miles long and sited between the river and its bluff, about 3/4 mile in depth, and "consists of nothing but huts roofed with mats... without any enclosure or entrenchment." Based on two original sources, the village had several hundred huts and thousands of inhabitants.

== Folklore ==
Later English speaking European pioneers did not have a clear idea what had happened to the people of the Grand Village. After the villagers dispersed, a tale was repeated in local folklore that members of the Illini Confederacy had been pinned by tribal enemies to a last stand atop Starved Rock. Hopelessly surrounded, the brave villagers refused to surrender and supposedly perished of starvation. It was said that this was how "Starved Rock" got its name.

=== Tonti ===
In one tale, attributed to the French and Indians, the explorer Henri de Tonti cached a hoard of gold on or near the canyons and bluffs of Starved Rock to secrete it from a French Canadian governor who had dismissed him. Later in 1704 when he was dying of yellow fever, Tonti described the treasure's location to the priest who was giving him last rites. As the story goes, the priest mentioned this revelation to third parties, but did not describe the secret location, and this key piece of information was lost when the priest died in an Illinois River canoe accident.

=== Pontiac ===
Another narrative centers on the death, in 1769, of Pontiac at the hands of an unnamed member of the Illini Confederacy. According to this story, the Pottawatomi, who were closely allied to Pontiac's kinfolk, made war on the Illini, forcing many of them to take refuge on the bluff that would become known as "Starved Rock." The Illini supposedly starved as their blufftop refuge was besieged.

== Today ==
The site of the Grand Village of the Illinois was acquired by the state of Illinois in 1991 as a non-operating site of the Illinois Historic Preservation Agency. As of 2023, it is not open to the public.

== Zimmerman site ==
Map of the Zimmerman site

The Zimmerman site (Ls-13) is an archaeological site located on the Illinois River across from Starved Rock, in the spot where the Grand Village of the Kaskaskia (aka Grand Village of the Illinois) once stood. It is a multi-component site representing prehistoric and early historic periods.

The environment around the Zimmerman site was predominantly prairie in the prehistoric period. The bluff extending along both sides of the Illinois River was an oak forest and the bottomlands supported vegetation tolerant of wetlands such as willow, maple, ash and cottonwood.

Early French explorers Joliet, Marquette, Allouez and Tonti were present at the Grand Village of Kaskaskia between 1673 and 1680. The Kaskaskia were a subdivision of the Illiniwek Confederacy. Other Illiniwek groups also had a presence at the site, most notably the Peoria, Tapouaro and Coiracoentanon. Later, other tribes such as the Miami and Shawnee were present at the site. In the fall of 1680 the village was burned down by an Iroquois war party and abandoned.

In the 1940s, Sara Jones Tucker of the University of Chicago initiated a project to determine the exact location of the Kaskaskia village site by reviewing the early French records. As a result of these efforts, the Zimmerman site was located.

== History of archaeological investigations ==
In 1947 the site was excavated under the auspices of the Illinois State Museum and the University of Chicago. Four grids were established: A, B, C and D. From 1970 to 1972 further excavations were conducted under the auspices of the LaSalle County Historical Society in Utica, Illinois. The later excavations focused on revisiting Grids A and B to obtain clarifications on some of the research problems identified in the initial project.

== Results of data analysis ==
Excavations at the site yielded Prehistoric and historic artifacts, house structures, pit features, burials, animal bone and plant remains.

=== Components ===
Several Prehistoric and Historic components were identified at the site:

- Heally Complex - Prehistoric Upper Mississippian
- Swanson Complex - Prehistoric Late Woodland
- Danner Complex - Historic Fort Ancient
- Huber Component - Prehistoric to early Historic Upper Mississippian; called “Zimmerman Component” in the 1947 excavations

The 1947 excavations also reported a tentative “Historic Heally” Complex that represented an extension of the Heally Complex into the early Historic period. However the 1970-72 investigations revealed that there was not enough evidence for a separate complex and that most of the Historic Heally was in fact part of the Danner Complex.

=== Structures ===
Floor plan of House C-3

Floor plan of Houses C-8 and C-13

Profile of Feature 33, "macopin" roasting pit

Two structures was defined in Grid C, both affiliated with the Heally Complex. The first is House C-3, a double-walled, roughly rectangular structure measuring 20x25 feet. It had 2 outer rows of posts and an inner row presumably supporting a bench. It contained 2 fire pits and 3 storage/refuse pits.

Houses C-8 and C-13 are overlapping, wall-trench rectangular pit houses, each measuring approximately 20x20 feet. These structures also apparently had a bench structure based on the post mold pattern. The excavators felt that these structures were semi-subterranean and perhaps covered with sod, Charcoal in some of the post molds implies that both structures were burned.

A large number of post molds present in Grid C implied the existence of additional houses, but none could be successfully delineated.

The houses at Zimmerman resemble houses observed at the nearby Fisher site. They contrast with the houses found at two Huber sites, Oak Forest and Anker, which were elongated oval in shape.

Several rock piles were noted in the Danner Complex that the excavators felt could have been sweat lodge areas.

=== Features ===
In 1947, 43 storage/refuse features and 15 roasting pit features were excavated. Each type was subdivided into variants based on depth and shape. It was felt that the storage/refuse pits started out as storage pits to keep foods fresh longer; as the food in them soured, they then were used as refuse pits while fresh storage pits were dug elsewhere. They contained culturally rich fill with potsherds, stone tool debris, animal bone, plant remains, etc.

Some of the roasting pits related to the Danner Complex appear to correspond to what has ethnographically been described as “macopin roasting pits” by the early French explorers Deliette and LaSalle. The macopins are apparently tubers from a species of water lily, perhaps the American Lotus (Nelumbo lutea). Tubers of Nelumbo lutea have been recovered from similar roasting pits at the Elam and Schwerdt sites on the Kalamazoo River in western Michigan; and tubers of the white water lily (Nymphaea tuberosa) have been recovered from roasting pits at the Griesmer site in northwestern Indiana. This particular cooking technique may have been used prehistorically for several species of similar water lilies, or other similar root plants. No tubers were specifically recovered from the Zimmerman site, however.

=== Burials ===
20 burials were excavated in 1947, of which few had any grave goods and only 4 were prehistoric. An additional 30 burials were excavated in 1970–72, including an infant burial with a spiked tomahawk and a bundle burial with a complete compass. Both of these artifacts were of European manufacture.

Two different burial patterns were noted; a primary interment with extended burials, and secondary reburials or bundle burials (aka ossuaries). The historic Illiniwek were observed to use both burial methods.

=== Animal remains ===
Langford trailed vessel

Designs on Langford trailed decorated pottery sherds

Designs on Langford trailed decorated pottery sherds

Heally trailed vessel

Swanson Series pottery sherds

Danner cordmarked vessel

Danner grooved paddle vessel

Keating cordmarked vessels

Remains from several species were recovered from the site. The main species present were deer, elk and bison; also present were beaver, raccoon, dog, black bear, river otter, fish (esp. freshwater drum), turtle and fresh water mussels (especially Amblema costata). These remains were not modified into tools like the bone tools described in the Artifacts section below, and may be considered food remains or, in the case of the dog, the remains of ceremonial activities. Dog sacrifice and dog meat consumption was observed to have ceremonial and religious implications in early Native American tribes.

=== Plant remains ===
Plant remains were recovered from both periods of excavation. The 1970-72 excavations used flotation sampling techniques to recover more small-scale plant remains such as seeds, which are generally missed during traditional excavation methods.

The plant remains recovered consisted of cultivated plants (maize, beans, squash and watermelon), nutshell (black walnut, shagbark hickory, pecan and hazelnut) and seeds (hackberry, hawthorn, plum, wild cherry, grape, and cattail or rush).

=== Artifacts ===
==== Pottery artifacts ====
Archaeologists often find pottery to be a very useful tool in analyzing a prehistoric culture. It is usually very common at a site and the details of manufacture and decoration are very sensitive indicators of time, space and culture.

9,747 sherds were recovered in the 1947 excavations, with the pottery analysis based on 395 rim sherds and decorated body sherds. In 1970–72, 3,746 sherds were recovered representing at least 64 vessels.

Based on analysis of the pottery collected in the 1948 and 1970-72 excavations, 4 distinct components were identified. They are presented below along with their associated pottery types:

===== Heally complex =====
- Langford plain - grit-tempered, globular vessels with plain surface, rim profile vertical to outflaring, typically not decorated except for rim notching. First reported from the Fisher site, Periods B and C. Time period: Prehistoric. Cultural affiliation: Upper Mississippian.
- Langford trailed - same as Langford plain, but decorated from neck to shoulder with fine to wide incised lines or curvilinear patterns made using a stick or antler tine. Decorations take the form of meandering parallel lines, nested arches and reed punctates. Lip sometimes notched or scalloped. First reported from the Fisher site, Period B. Related to Grand River trailed in the Oneota Tradition. Time period: Prehistoric. Cultural affiliation: Upper Mississippian.
- Langford cordmarked - same as Langford plain, but with cordmarked surface. Sometimes collared and lip sometimes pinched or scalloped. First reported from the Fisher site, Period B. Time period: Prehistoric. Cultural affiliation: Upper Mississippian.
- Langford trailed (Cordmarked) - grit-tempered, globular vessels with cordmarked surface, rim profile vertical to outflaring, decorated from neck to shoulder with shallow wide trailed lines and reed punctates. Decorations take the form of curvilinear parallel undulating lines in a meander pattern. Lips rounded and notched. First reported from the Fisher site, Period B. Time period: Prehistoric. Cultural affiliation: Upper Mississippian.
- Heally trailed - shell-tempered, cordmarked vessels decorated between the neck and the shoulder with shallow trailed lines and reed punctates. Decoration takes the form of meander patterns of parallel curvilinear lines. Related to the type Fisher trailed. Defined on the basis of 118 sherds analyzed from the Zimmerman site. Time period: Prehistoric. Cultural affiliation: Upper Mississippian.

===== Swanson complex =====
- Swanson Smooth - grit-tempered vessels with smoothed surfaces and slightly outflaring rim profile and rounded and notched lips. Has relationships with pottery from Moccasin Bluff, Starved Rock and Hotel Plaza, the last two of which are Protohistoric to early historic. Defined on the basis of 133 sherds analyzed from the Zimmerman site. Time period: prehistoric. Cultural affiliation: Late Woodland.
- Swanson cordmarked - grit-tempered, globular vessels with slightly elongated, semi-conoidal bases, cordmarked surface, slightly outflaring rim profile, rounded and notched lips, and fingernail impressions at the base of neck. Similar pottery has been found at Starved Rock and Hotel Plaza sites in Protohistoric and early Historic contexts. Also similar pottery has been recovered from the Fisher and Moccasin Bluff sites. Defined on the basis of 308 sherds analyzed from the Zimmerman site. Time period: Prehistoric. Cultural affiliation: Late Woodland.
- Swanson check-stamped - grit-tempered globular vessels with check-stamped and/or cordmarked surface finish, slightly flaring rim profile, and flat lip. Lips often decorated with stick impressions or punctates. Defined on the basis of 3 rim sherds and 64 body sherds analyzed from the Zimmerman site. Time period: Prehistoric. Cultural affiliation: Early Late Woodland.

===== Danner complex =====
- Danner grooved paddle - shell-tempered globular vessels with outflaring rim profile, “hourglass” strap handles and rounded, notched lips. Surface finish is grooved-paddle finish applied below the shoulder and smoothed finish above the shoulder; with punctate decoration where the two zones meet. Related to the type Madisonville grooved paddle. Defined on the basis of 64 sherds and one restored vessel from the Zimmerman site. Time period: prehistoric to early historic. Prehistoric Cultural Affiliation: Fort Ancient. Historic Cultural Affiliation: Unknown, possibly Shawnee.
- Danner cordmarked - shell-tempered vessels with cordmarked surface finish below the shoulder and smoothed surface finish above, outflaring rim profile, angular lips and “hourglass” strap handles. Related to the type Madisonville cordmarked. Similar to the type LaSalle filleted at the Starved Rock and Hotel Plaza sites. Defined on the basis of over 100 sherds analyzed from the Zimmerman site. Time period: Prehistoric to early Historic. Prehistoric Cultural Affiliation: Fort Ancient. Historic Cultural Affiliation: Unknown, possibly Shawnee.
- Keating cordmarked - shell-tempered globular vessels with slightly elongated semi-conoidal bases, flared rim profile, cordmarked surface finish, finger impressions on lip, and lug handles. Defined on the basis of 2 vessels, 9 rims and 133 sherds recovered in 1970-1972 and 70 sherds from the 1947 excavations. Closely related to Madisonville cordmarked. Time period: Prehistoric to early Historic. Prehistoric Cultural Affiliation: Fort Ancient. Historic Cultural Affiliation: Unknown, possibly Shawnee.

===== Huber component =====
- Huber plain - shell-tempered globular vessels with outflaring rim profile. Sometimes strap handles and/or lip notching occurs. Known from several sites in the lower Lake Michigan region, centering on the Chicago area. Type defined from the Griesmer site in northwestern Indiana. Time period: Prehistoric to Protohistoric/Early Historic. Prehistoric Cultural Affiliation: Upper Mississippian. Protohistoric/Early Historic Cultural Affiliation: Unknown, possibly Miami, Illiniwek, Potawatomi or Chiwere Sioux.
- Huber trailed - like Huber plain except decorated with narrow to wide trailed lines from the neck to the shoulder. Known from several sites in the lower Lake Michigan region, centering on the Chicago area. Type defined from the Griesmer site in northwestern Indiana. Time period: Prehistoric to Protohistoric/Early Historic. Prehistoric Cultural Affiliation: Upper Mississippian. Protohistoric/Early Historic Cultural Affiliation: Unknown, possibly Miami, Illiniwek, Potawatomi or Chiwere Sioux.

===== Other types present =====
Zimmerman filleted - shell-tempered, globular vessels with slightly outflaring rim profile, rounded lip and applied rim strip at transition between neck and shoulder. Surface finish is plain or cordmarked, Similar fillets have been reported from the Moccasin Bluff (Moccasin Bluff Notched Applique Strip, a grit-tempered type) and Palos sites. Time period: Protohistoric to historic. Cultural affiliation: Unknown.

LaSalle filleted - shell-tempered, globular vessels with flared rims, round to flat lips, and a notched fillet on the neck portion. Vessels of this type have been recovered from the Hotel Plaza site and the Rock Island II site in Green Bay, northern Lake Michigan. Like the Danner Series, this pottery type is also related to the Madisonville focus. Time period: Protohistoric to Historic. Cultural affiliation: Fort Ancient.

==== Other artifacts ====
Non-pottery artifacts recovered from the site included:

- Stone artifacts - including projectile points, scrapers (subdivided into variants based on manufacturing technique), knives, drills and scraper-knives. Of the projectile points, the most numerous category was the small triangular Madison point.
- Ground stone artifacts - including arrow shaft straighteners, manos, hammerstones, celts, sandstone abraders, a milling stone, whetstones, pendants, a gorget, gunflints, stone balls, a stone cup, a paint stone, worked slate pieces, red ochre fragments, and a piece of hematite.
- Bone and antler artifacts - including awls, pins, perforators, mat needles, a bone projectile point, beamers, bison scapula hoes, an elk scapula spade, a styliform deer bone ornament, a deer rib spatulate instrument, a bird bone tube, a bone ring, a smoothed/polished bone disc, a ball made from a deer femur head, bone pendants, a fragmentary turtle carapace bowl, bone or antler game counters, an antler spearpoint, antler projectile points, antler tines, a small rib pottery decorating tool, a shaft wrench, antler flakers, bone tubes, an antler harpoon and antler digging tools. Many of these are described further below.
- Shell artifacts - including spoons, a hoe and a pendant.
- Pipes - an elbow pipe was recovered in 1947, and a polished granite pipe was recovered in the 1970-1972 excavations.
- European trade goods - including beads, glass bottle fragments, kaolin pipe bowl fragments, brass coil and brass fragments, brass wire ornaments, copper or brass janglers or tinkling cones, copper or brass rolled tubular beads, sheet copper or brass fragments, a tomahawk, a compass, a brass serpent effigy, iron knife blades and fragments, iron nails, iron axe heads, an iron awl, and unidentifiable iron fragments.

The non-pottery artifacts found at an archaeological site can provide useful cultural context as well as a glimpse into the domestic tasks performed at a site; ceremonial or religious activities; recreational activities; and clothing or personal adornment.

Some of the most prominent and diagnostic non-pottery artifacts are presented here in more detail:

| Material | Description | Image | Qty | Function / use | Comments / associations |
|---|---|---|---|---|---|
| Chipped stone | Small triangular points (aka Madison points) | Projectile points | 81 | Hunting/fishing/warfare | Also known as “arrowheads”; are thought to be arrow-tips for bows-and-arrows. The usage of the bow-and-arrow seems to have greatly increased after A.D. 1000, probably as a result of increased conflict. At Zimmerman, they were associated with both the Heally and Danner complexes. |
| Chipped stone | Drills (expanding base) | Drills | 3 different types (expanding base, parallel-sided and side-notched) | Domestic function / processing wood or hides | The expanding base type (pictured) is common in Upper Mississippian contexts; at Zimmerman, this type is associated with the Heally component |
| Chipped stone | Scraper (bi-convex) | Scraper | 60 | Domestic function / processing wood or hides | This type of scraper is associated with the Heally Component; also reported at the Plum Island and Fisher (Period B) sites |
| Stone | Elbow pipe fragment | Elbow pipe | 1 | Ceremonial-Recreational function / pipe smoking | Common at sites in Illinois and Wisconsin, and at Fisher (Period B); one was associated with a burial at the Anker Site near Chicago; the one at Zimmerman is probably associated with the Heally Component |
| Bone | Mat needles | Mat needle | 4 | Domestic function / processing hides | Used by prairie tribes to make reed mats. This specimen is hooked; the other needles recovered did not have hooks |
| Bone | Beamers | Beamer | 2 | Domestic function / hide-working tool, used for scraping hair off hides | Commonly found at Fisher, Huber, Langford and Fort Ancient sites; the Zimmerman specimens are associated with the Heally Component. |
| Bone | Scapula hoes | Scapula hoe | 18 | Domestic function / Agricultural-horticultural or general digging tool | Common at late Fisher and Oneota sites; they may have been used to dig out the pit features present at Zimmerman. Based on the context of recovery, the excavators felt that most of the Zimmerman specimens came from Historic components. |
| Bone | Styliform deer bone ornament | Styliform bird bone ornament | 1 | Personal Adornment and/or Ceremonial function | Possibly used as a plume holder |
| Bone | Bone pendants | Bone pendants | 2 | Personal Adornment / Art Work | One is a fragment of a wheel, and the other is in the shape of a bird. Associated with House C-8/13 and affiliated with the Heally Complex. |
| Bone | Game counters | Bone game pieces | 7 | Entertainment function | These have been found at Fisher (Period B), Huber, Langford and Oneota (especially Grand River focus and Lake Winnebago focus) and may have been used in a gambling game. Gambling was noted to be a popular pastime among the early Native American tribes. The specimens from Zimmerman were associated with the Heally Complex. |
| Shell | Spoons | Shell spoon | 3 | Domestic function / Food preparation, serving | Affiliated with Heally Complex |
| Bone | Bird bone tubes | Bird bone tubes | 5 | Personal Adornment and/or Ceremonial function | May have been used as part of a necklace or hair decoration; or may have been used in a ceremony. Medicine men used tubes like this to "suck out" evil spirits in curing ceremonies. |
| Antler | Antler harpoon | Antler harpoon | 2 | Fishing function | This artifact has also been recovered from the Fisher site in northern Illinois and the Fifield site in northwestern Indiana; similar harpoons made of bone instead of antler were found at the Oak Forest site near Chicago and the Juntunen site on Bois Blanc Island in Michigan. |
| Brass | Serpent effigy | Brass serpent | 1 | Personal Adornment and/or Ceremonial function | Similar serpent figurines have been found at other sites in the American Midwest region: several Oneota Orr focus sites in Iowa; the Fifield Site in northwestern Indiana just east of Chicago; the Summer Island site in Michigan; and the Madisonville site in Ohio.[7] The Orr focus sites, Madisonville and Summer Island all have early European trade goods associated, indicating these figurines were still being made at the time of European contact. The Zimmerman specimen was of European manufacture, while the others just mentioned are of native manufacture. |
| Iron | Tomahawk | Tomahawk | 1 | Warfare function | European trade item; found in an infant burial |
| Brass and iron | Compass | Compass | 1 | Traveling/exploring function | European trade item; found in a bundle burial |

=== Summary of occupations ===
==== Heally complex ====
The Prehistoric Heally complex is represented by two house structures and the grit-tempered Langford Series and shell-tempered Heally trailed pottery types. The economy of the Heally complex was agricultural based with hunting (especially for deer and elk) also of importance. Based on the pottery types, Heally is closely related to the Upper Mississippian Fisher culture as noted at the Fisher site (Periods B and C), along with other sites in the area such as Plum Island and Gentleman Farm.

The time range of Heally is thought to be about A.D. 1300 to just before European contact or about A.D. 1600. A radiocarbon date of A.D. 1490 was obtained off collagen from a burial associated with a Langford pot.

There is some stratification in the areas of the site with Heally remains, and the pottery has been observed to change through time. Shell-tempered pottery is most common at the beginning of the sequence, while at the end almost all pottery is grit-tempered.

==== Swanson complex ====
This complex is represented by the Swanson Series pottery, a Late Woodland ware similar to that found in other sites ranging from Moccasin Bluff in Michigan to Hotel Plaza in Illinois. The type Swanson Check Stamped is similar to Early Late Woodland pottery types and indicates this complex is very ancient. The probable timeframe of Swanson is approximately A.D. 800 to just before European contact or about A.D. 1600. The Swanson people cultivated maize but a large part of their diet was supplied by hunting a wide variety of game, and gathering nuts (particularly hazelnut) and berries.

==== Danner complex ====
This complex is the only one that has been securely associated with early European trade goods so is fully post-European contact in age. The economy of the Danner complex is characterized by a heavier dependence on maize/beans/squash agriculture and hunting focused on the bison. Danner is represented by shell-tempered Fort Ancient pottery closely related to the Madisonville focus in Ohio.

Based on 1. The Danner pottery is unlike other Late Prehistoric pottery in Illinois and looks like Madisonville focus pottery from Ohio; 2. The Fort Ancient Madisonville focus pottery has been attributed by some archaeologists to represent the pottery of the Shawnee tribe; and 3. The Shawnee are recorded as being one of the tribes present at the Grand Village of the Kaskaskia; therefore it's been proposed that the Danner Complex represents the Shawnee tribe. However, this is still a matter of sharp debate among archaeologists.

==== Huber component ====
Huber is an Upper Mississippian culture closely related to Fisher and often Fisher and Huber pottery occur on the same sites. The Huber people also cultivated maize/beans/squash and other crops. They have been noted to have cultivated the Eastern Agricultural Complex (EAC) of small seed plants such as knotweed, little barley and goosefoot, among others. Hunting of deer, elk and bison also contributed to their diet. Huber pottery is a distinctive shell-tempered ware that occurs on a series of sites centered in the Chicago area, but also ranging to northwestern Indiana and southwestern Michigan. The Anker site near Chicago has produced a number of artifacts that seem to come from outside the area, especially from the Middle Mississippian cultures of Arkansas; indicating a wide-ranging trade network.

Huber pottery has been found at sites with European trade goods, indicating this culture lasted until after European contact. However, the specific tribe that produced the Huber pottery is still a matter of debate among archaeologists. The Miami seem to be the most likely, since they occupied the area around the south shore of Lake Michigan during early Historic times. However, the Illiniwek, Potawatomi and Chiwere Sioux are also considered possibilities.

=== Seasonality, subsistence, and settlement patterns ===
Based on the plant and animal remains collected at the site, along with large numbers of bison scapula hoes, archaeologists believe the Zimmerman site was an agricultural village that was occupied for most if not all of the year. This is also supported by the presence of two houses in the Heally Complex (Grid C), which were fairly substantial and implied a more or less permanent occupation.

There is a contrast in subsistence strategies between the historic Danner Complex and the prehistoric occupations at the site. The earlier subsistence patterns were more geared on exploiting multiple resources. The Danner Complex aimed for a more focused adaptation by relying on a few high-yield resources such as agriculture and bison hunting. Archaeologists also believe that the bison did not range into Illinois until after A.D. 1600, just before European contact, which is when the Danner Complex developed.

With regards to settlement patterns, the permanent houses of the Heally Complex seem to have given way to less permanent wigwam-type structures in the early Historic period. This may be why no houses related to the Danner Complex have been found. With a greater reliance on bison hunting, it may have been advantageous to have a more mobile settlement pattern in order to move with the herds. They would still have their primary village where they planted their crops but it would not be occupied continually.

== See also ==
- List of archaeological sites on the National Register of Historic Places in Illinois
- Cahokia
- Kolmer Site, another Illiniwek village
