= Frank W. Gunsaulus =

American preacher, educator, and humanitarian

Frank Wakeley Gunsaulus
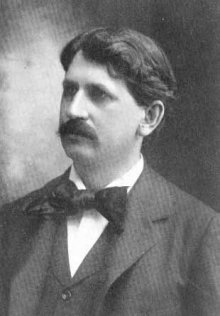
- Born: January 1, 1856; Chesterville, Ohio
- Died: March 17, 1921 (aged 65); Chicago, Illinois
- Burial place: Forest Home Cemetery
- Occupations: Minister, educator, orator
- Spouse: Georgeanna Long (m. 1875)
- Children: Joseph Long, Martha Weight, Beatrice Hawley, Mary Freeman, Helen Cowen
- Parent(s): Joseph Gunsaulus, Mary Hawley

Frank Wakeley Gunsaulus (January 1, 1856 – March 17, 1921) was a noted preacher, educator, pastor, author and humanitarian. Famous for his "Million Dollar Sermon" which led Philip Danforth Armour to donate money to found Armour Institute of Technology where Gunsaulus served as president for its first 27 years. Gunsaulus lived in Chicago for 34 years where he was pastor of Plymouth Church (1887–99) and Central Church from 1899 until two years before his death. He was a prominent figure in Chicago's social, educational, and civic improvements. In 1893, he was named first president of Armour Institute of Technology (now Illinois Institute of Technology). His extraordinary energy, masterful oratory skills, and intellectual talents influenced the city's spiritual, educational, cultural, and civic development for decades.

== Early life ==
Frank Wakely Gunsaulus was born in Chesterville, Morrow County, Ohio, on January 1, 1856, the son of Joseph and Mary (Hawley) Gunsaulus. He was a descendant of Manuel Gonsalus (Gonzales), a Spaniard and early settler in Sullivan County, New York who lived near Rochester and married into a Dutch family in Kingston, Ulster County. His father, Joseph, was an attorney and notary public in Chesterville who was born on a farm in Cayuga County, New York on April 29, 1825. Frank Gunsaulus' oratorical skills, extraordinary memory and mental agility, impassioned leadership, and his dedication to civic duty, patriotism and democratic ideals can be attributed to the influence of his father.

In 1861, Joseph was elected as the Republican representative from Morrow County to the state legislature. He represented the county for four years, served on the Military Committee where he advised Governors William Dennison and David Tod during the Civil War, and was chair of the Committee on Municipal Corporations. He was mayor of Chesterville for 20 years, was one of its incorporators, was a member of its council and was president of its school board. In 1854, Joseph married Mary Jane Hawley, who was born in Kentucky. Their two children were Frank Wakely and Lillian C., also born in Chesterville in 1862.

Frank W. Gunsaulus attended public schools in Chesterville and was admitted to Ohio Wesleyan University, Delaware, Ohio, at the age of 16. He was known by his classmates and professors to have a ravenous appetite for reading "the classics" coupled with a prodigious memory and a keen intellect. Always a popular student on campus, his classmates and professors were amazed by his public speaking skills and frequently made a point to attend his regular oratories at the school, where many claimed they were spellbound by his charm, wit, passion, and intelligence. He graduated from Wesleyan in 1875 at the age of 19 and was married that year to Georgeanna (Anna), daughter of George Long of Parsons, West Virginia and 1875 graduate of Ohio Wesleyan Female College.

== Early ministry ==
After completing college, Gunsaulus was ordained to the Methodist Ministry and was an itinerant minister (circuit rider) for several years. In 1879, he entered the Congregational ministry and became pastor of the Eastwood Congregational Church in Columbus, Ohio, where he served until 1881. During this period, he and Georgeanne had three children: Joseph Long (1877), Martha G. (1879) and Beatrice (1881). He then served as a very popular pastor in Newtonville, Massachusetts, between 1881 and 1885 and at the Brown Memorial church in Baltimore between 1885 and 1887. While in Baltimore, Gunsaulus spent considerable time at the Johns Hopkins University Library and made contact with faculty members and students. He guest-lectured there on "The Messages of the Great English Poets" and later referred to the programs at Johns Hopkins as an educational model. During this period, he and Georgeanne added Mary J. (1884) and Helen C. (1886) to their family.

== Plymouth Congregational Church ==
In 1887, Gunsaulus was called to the Plymouth Congregational Church in Chicago. At that time, the Plymouth Church had a mission Sunday school to which Joseph F. Armour, a noted and wealthy Chicago merchant, had contributed liberally. The mission, at 31st and State streets, had started in 1874, just three years after the Great Chicago Fire. When Joseph F. Armour died in 1881, he left $100,000 for his brother, Philip D. Armour, the wealthy meatpacker and grain merchant, to establish a Sunday school. Phillip D. Armour added another $100,000 of his own money and had the "Armour Mission" built.

The mission's members were to be non-sectarian without restrictions on race, creed or class. Just before Frank Gunsaulus arrived, about 700 new members joined the experiment in "practical Christian democracy" on its first Sunday in December 1886. Among the workers and teachers from Plymouth Church that assisted was Julia A. Beveridge, the mission librarian. Beveridge discovered that books were not enough to keep the members interested, so she started clay modeling classes. She soon added classes in wood carving, tile-making, freehand and mechanical drawing, and design.

== Armour Institute of Technology ==
Framed portrait painting of Frank W. Gunsaulus wearing academic robes, by Louis Betts – displayed on an easel in front of a wall with other paintings in Chicago, Illinois

After Gunsaulus arrived in Chicago, he noted the effectiveness of Beveridge at the mission. He went on to preach a number of brilliant sermons to his affluent and influential neighbors, such as George Pullman and Marshall Field, about their social responsibility to the poor, uneducated, and unfortunate. In 1890, he delivered a classic sermon when Philip D. Armour was in attendance. Gunsaulus declared that if he had a million dollars, he would start a school to help the young prepare for work in the new industrial age. After the sermon (called "The Million Dollar Sermon"), Armour approached Gunsaulus and offered to give him the money to establish a trade school for the practical arts and sciences if Gunsaulus would dedicate five years of his life to run it. Thus, in 1893, the Armour Institute of Technology (now the Illinois Institute of Technology) was established with Frank Wakely Gunsaulus as its first president. The school first offered courses in engineering, chemistry, architecture and library science. Gunsaulus continued to serve as president of the Institute until his death in 1921. In honor of its first president, Skidmore, Owings & Merrill designed Gunsaulus Hall near 31st and Michigan Avenue (completed in 1949), which provides housing for graduate students and their families. Scholarships and an alumni fundraising group are also named in his honor.

== Education philosophy ==
Gunsaulus was an educational reform leader who influenced schools, institutions, and associations with a message often expressed as "head, heart and hand." Gunsaulus made appearances throughout the country, at commencement ceremonies and as a lecturer at colleges and universities, to spread his ideas about education.

With a firm belief that a democratic educational meritocracy was the best way to develop individually and as a nation, Gunsaulus wanted practical education to be spread among the masses to everyone who wished to learn. He believed in an orderly and disciplined universe; therefore, science and math appealed to him. He also recognized the importance of character in self-development. Ideally, he said, education should prepare one to perform in the service of fellow men, which requires instruction and discipline. During the process, students should also develop an appreciation for spiritual power, which inculcates values that are used to make sound judgments and restrain impulses.

An example of his philosophy put into action was the establishment of a four-year course in Fire Protection Engineering at the Armour Institute of Technology. Gunsaulus was convinced that the Great Fire of Chicago in 1871 could have caused less damage if fire prevention and protection were taken seriously. In cooperation with Underwriters Laboratories and the Western Actuarial Bureau, a scholarship fund was established and a curriculum developed for a new branch of engineering that incorporated noble goals in the service of mankind.

To honor his contributions to Chicago education, the Frank W. Gunsaulus Scholastic Academy was named for him. A back-to-basics magnet school that accepts students from throughout Chicago, the academy received the School of Excellence Award in 2002.

== Lectures ==
Gunsaulus was a tireless lecturer who not only delivered stirring sermons from his pulpit, but also traveled extensively throughout the country and England to speak by invitation at schools, churches, and many other public venues. In 1893, he was named divinity lecturer at Yale theological seminary and was professorial lecturer at the University of Chicago. He also lectured for many years at the Chicago Theological Seminary and McCormick Theological Seminary.

In the late 19th and early 20th centuries, a form of circuit lectures, called Chautauqua, was formed initially to train Sunday school teachers. It later expanded into a series of lectures for rural Americans to provide stimulating thought and discussion about important issues. This forum was perfect for Gunsaulus who, along with other great orators of the day such as William Jennings Bryan, Maud Ballington Booth, Robert La Follette, Joseph Folk, and Hiram Johnson, provided culture and entertainment to small towns. Although few were transcribed, Frank Gunsaulus lecture titles included "A Chapter in the History of Liberty," "Savonarola," "The Later Eloquence of Puritanism," "The War Against the War," "Oliver Cromwell and His Times," 'The Higher Ministry of Poetry," "Rembrandt as an Interpreter of the Gospel," "Robert Browning," "The Next Step in Education," and "Gladstone." His favorite lectures were about William Ewart Gladstone, considered one of the greatest British prime ministers, and Girolamo Savonarola, the 15th century Dominican priest in Florence, Italy. According to Gunsaulus' friends, the Chautauqua chairman once said that he had "the distinguished honor of introducing Mr. Savonarola, who would deliver his lecture on Gunsaulus." Whether an innocent mistake or a friendly barb, the remark was deemed accurate by those who knew Gunsaulus well.

== Publications ==
Gunsaulus is the author of fifteen books dealing with a variety of topics including poetry, music, history and Christianity as well as numerous contributions to periodicals. He was also editor-in-chief for technical books published for the American School of Correspondence at Armour Institute of Technology.

== Civic leadership ==
Dr. Gunsaulus came to Chicago when the city was swept up with a sense of urban revival after the Great Fire of 1871 and civic pride sparked by the prospect of hosting an exposition to celebrate the 400th anniversary of Columbus' epic journey to the New World. Competing against other major U.S. cities, Chicago business leaders committed $5 million to the fair and promised another $5 million if the city were selected. Noting the success of the 1876 Centennial in Philadelphia, Gunsaulus was at the core of a small group of civic-minded leaders who promoted the fair as a means to push Chicago into the international spotlight as a center for commerce, education, architecture and the arts. The civic pride, unity, energy, and vision generated by the project is fondly remembered by Chicagoans who refer to this part of the city's history as "the World's Fair period."

Often called Chicago's "First Citizen," Gunsaulus was involved in dozens of civic, educational, humanitarian and social enterprises throughout his residence in Chicago. In addition to guiding the early development of the Armour Mission, his ideas are credited with inspiring the founding of the Chicago Sunday Evening Club in 1907, a spiritual forum that eventually incorporated radio and television broadcasts that are still aired today by WTTW-TV, the Public Broadcasting Station in Chicago. He was also notably involved with the Illinois Industrial Training School for Boys, now called the Glenwood School for Boys and Girls. Gunsaulus lent his enthusiasm, leadership and advice in the school's early years. He also was involved in the YMCA, the Union League Club, the Brown University Club, the Church Federation of Chicago, the Chicago Congregational Ministerial Union, and parent-teachers organizations throughout the city.

== Collections and donations ==
Gunsaulus was a very active collector of books and artwork. An avid reader, he collected many books, letters and autographs written by those who appealed to him. The Butler-Gunsaulus Collection at the University of Chicago contains 340 American and European manuscripts and letters by authors such as John Adams, William Cullen Bryant, Ralph Waldo Emerson, Horace Greeley, Washington Irving, Andrew Jackson, Thomas Jefferson, James Madison, William Henry Seward, Frederick Douglass, and George Washington. Gunsaulus also donated valuable 13th-, 14th-, and 15th-century manuscripts to the Ohio Weslayan Library including works by Robert Browning, William Shakespeare, and Galileo; Roman papyri; illuminated hymnals, and an original King James Bible.

Gunsaulus also understood that art, especially art shared with the masses, was a practical means to give pleasure and inspiration, thus enriching the lives of many with whom it was shared. Gunsaulus actively promoted the advancement of fine art programs within an educational context and preached that art museums, libraries and laboratories should work with colleges and universities to share enlightenment and appreciation of art. To that end, Gunsaulus not only collected art, which he donated to various institutions, but he also worked with these institutions to ensure that it was shared with as many people as possible. He was a trustee of the Art Institute of Chicago for 13 years when the Institute built a new structure in time for the Columbian Exposition of 1893. In addition to donating his collections of Wedgwood and pottery of the Near East to the institute, he also encouraged other Chicago citizens to donate their money and art collections to the Museum, notably Emma Hodge, Jane Bell, and Frank Logan. One donor, William H. Miner, was convinced to donate the money to The Art Institute and Gunsaulus wished to name the hall after Mr. Miner, but Will Miner countered that his donation of $50,000 for new galleries would be on condition that they be named in Gunsaulus' honor. From The Saturday Morning Herald, November 6, 1915 "...It was Dr. Gunsaulus who pointed out to Mr. Miner the great need for a place for the objects of Industrial Art worth $225,000 which are now inadequately displayed. Mr. Miner refused to permit the gallery to be named after himself, asserting that the honor should go to one who has taken the greatest interest in building up the exhibit, and named the pastor of Central Church." Gunsaulus Hall stands today as a two-story building that spans the Illinois Central railway tracks. The lower floor houses the Harding Collection of European arms and armor. The upper level contains galleries that contain modern and contemporary collections considered to be one of the finest and most comprehensive in the world.

== Public leadership and honors ==
As a progressive social Chicago leader, Gunsaulus sought to influence public access to social institutions. He served as a board member of the Art Institute of Chicago (Gunsaulus Hall is named after him) and was founding board member of the Field Museum of Natural History where there is another Gunsaulus Hall. Gunsaulus held "chair" positions as a lecturer at Yale theological seminary in 1893 and professorial lecturer at the University of Chicago. He was named Merrick lecturer at Ohio Weslayan in 1921, but died before going to his former school. Honorary degrees bestowed on Gunsaulus include a Master of Arts by Ohio Wesleyan University in 1887 and a Doctor of Laws in 1905; a Doctor of Divinity degree by Beloit College (Wisconsin) in 1889; Doctor of Laws by Miami University, Oxford, Ohio, in 1908; and a Doctor of Laws by Marietta University in 1909.

== Political activities ==
As a Christian crusader, civic promoter and educational reformer, Gunsaulus generally did not participate in political matters. However, he was called upon many times to express his opinions on important matters of the day, particularly those that involved moral issues. His key guiding principles were "honor, tolerance, equality, and humanity." Many times he brought guest lecturers to his pulpit at Plymouth Congregational Church or to the Armour Institute. Notables included Booker T. Washington, who implored students and church-goers to help solve "the Negro problem." Among other political friends he invited was President Howard Taft, who spoke at the 20th anniversary celebration at the Armour Institute.

Gunsaulus also spoke out for the freedom of Cuba in 1895 and for fair treatment of both Puerto Rico and the Philippines after the Spanish–American War. In 1908, he rebuked a religious issue in the 1908 Taft-Bryan presidential campaign (Taft's Unitarianism was harshly criticized) and used European history to point out the risks of religious bigotry. During World War I, Gunsaulus did not agree with critics who argued that the war proved that Christianity was impotent in providing moral guidance to national leaders. He believed that Christianity's gentle form of persuasion for liberty, brotherhood, goodwill and democracy, versus the rampant militarism that was killing millions, would ultimately triumph. Gunsaulus devoted much time to mobilize and shore up spiritual and moral forces behind the U.S. war effort, including speaking to soldiers before they shipped out to the European theater. He spoke out against pacifists and overly generous peace terms contemplated by President Wilson by replying rhetorically to Germany, "Master of wanton states with madness bold, I cannot trust your word. Give me your sword!"

== Death ==
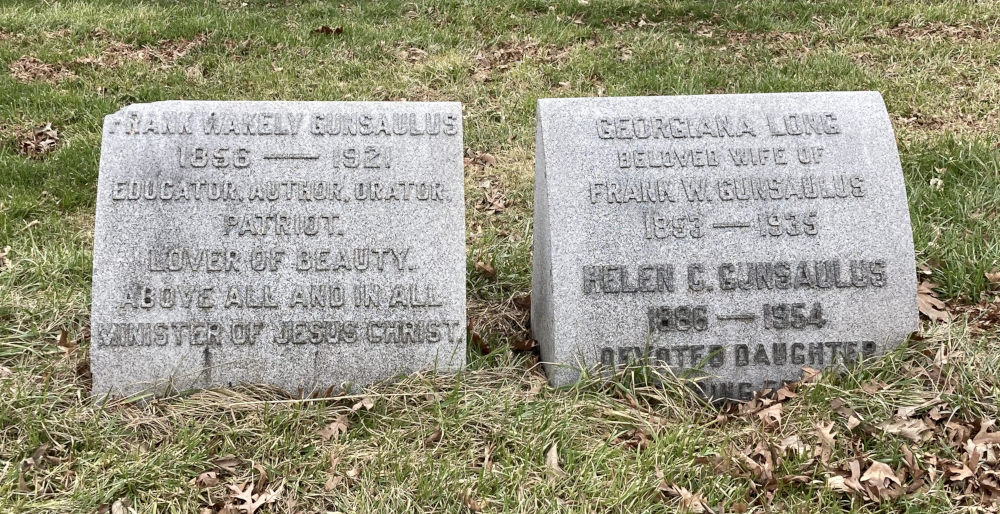
Gunsaulus' grave at Forest Home Cemetery

Dr. Gunsaulus died on March 17, 1921, at the age of 65 of heart failure. He suffered from several debilitating illnesses in his final years, but kept working at the Armour Institute while maintaining a demanding lecture schedule. His funeral was held at New England Congregational Church in Chicago on March 19. Officiating was Dr. Frederick F. Shannon, rector of Central Church. Dr. Shannon was assisted by Gunsaulus' brother-in-law, Dr. Clarence T. Brown of the Austin Congregational Church, and Reverend Charles W. Gilkey of the Hyde Park Baptist Church. He was buried at Forest Home Cemetery.

Gunsaulus' death was noted in newspapers throughout the United States and England. The New York Evening Post compared his oratory powers to Phillips Brooks and Henry Ward Beecher and his social Christian leadership to Jenkin Lloyd Jones and Dr. Washington Galdden. His pallbearers were Philip Armour (III), Eugene Thomas, Charles Stridiron, Alfred Hodge, George Allison, and Raymond Thornberg. The list of honorary pallbearers included J. Ogden Armour, Bernard E. Sunny, Frank C. Logan, Stanley Field, Martin A. Ryerson, Harry Pratt Judson, Charles L. Hutchinson, Julius Rosenwald, John Miller, Edward B. Butler, W. H. Miner, A. C. Bartlet, John S. Field, William C. Smith, R. H. Parkinson, Berthold Laufer, George M. Reynolds, Lester Armour, Dr. H. B. Thomas, David R. Forgan, Bishop Samuel Fallows, Dean H. M. Raymond, Dean Louis C. Monin, Dr. Graham Taylor, Dr. J. C. K. McClure, Dr. Frank Billings, Ex-Gov. Frank O. Lowden, Cyrus H. McCormick, Judge Kenesaw Mountain Landis, Victor F. Lawson, O. B. Taft, O. W. Wright, Bion J. Arnold, Rensselaer W. Cox, Dr. O. S. Davis, E. A. Bancroft, Frederick U. Smith, and E. D. Hulbert.

In a 1921 memoriam publication edited by Gunsaulus' wife, Georgeanna, Edgar A. Bancroft of the Illinois Bar Association remarked, "No citizen has ever had a broader or clearer vision of the higher possibilities of Chicago in human development, or has done more to shape the forces to realize this vision. Truly it has been said: 'He was the first citizen of his city─the incarnation of its genius and the prophecy of its future.'"

== Books authored ==
- Monk and Knight: An Historical Study in Fiction. 1891. LCCN 07-2850
- Phidias, and Other Poems. 1891. LCCN 26-5679
- Songs of Night and Day. 1896. LCCN 26-5680
- Young Men in History. 1898. LCCN 98-1966
- William Ewart Gladstone: A Biographical Study. 1898. LCCN 03-28324
- The Man of Galilee: A Biographical Study of the Life of Jesus Christ. 1899. LCCN 99-5074
- Paths to Power: Central Church Sermons. 1905 LCCN 05-33035
- Paths to the City of God. 1906 LCCN 06-41778
- The Transfiguration of Christ. c1907. LCCN 07-12672
- The Higher Ministries of Recent English Poetry. 1907. LCCN 07-23730
- The Minister and the Spiritual Life. c1911. LCCN 12-850
- Martin Luther and the Morning Hour in Europe; Two Lectures Delivered at the University of Chicago, October 16 and 17. c1917. LCCN 18-411
