= Charles L. Hutchinson =

American businessperson

Charles Lawrence Hutchinson
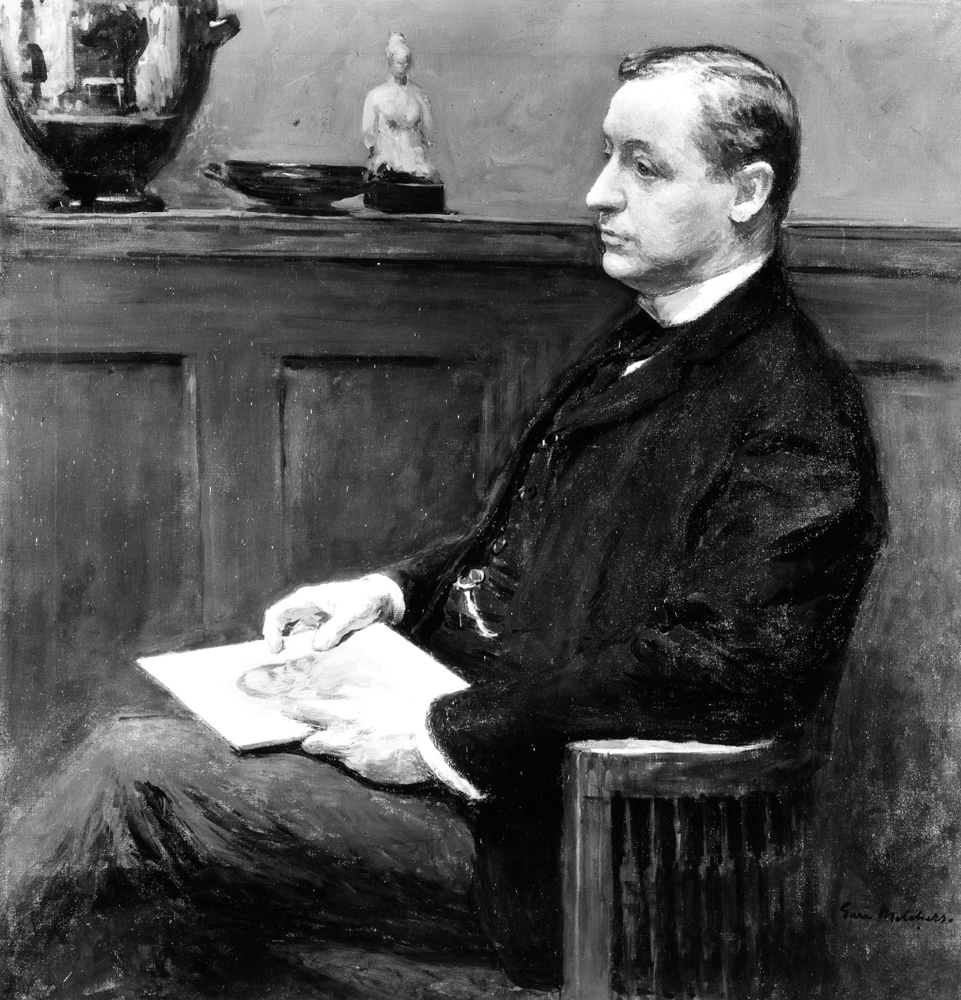
- Photographic image of a painting of Hutchinson by the artist Gari Melchers
- Born: March 7, 1854; Lynn, Massachusetts
- Died: October 7, 1924 (aged 70); Chicago, Illinois
- Burial place: Graceland Cemetery
- Occupations: Banker; President of the Chicago Board of Trade; Philanthropist
- Spouse: Frances (née Kinsley) Hutchinson (m. 1857)
- Parent(s): Sarah (née Ingalls) and Benjamin P. Hutchinson

Charles Lawrence Hutchinson (March 7, 1854 – October 7, 1924) was a Chicago business leader and philanthropist who is best remembered today as the founding and long-time president of the Art Institute of Chicago.

== Background ==
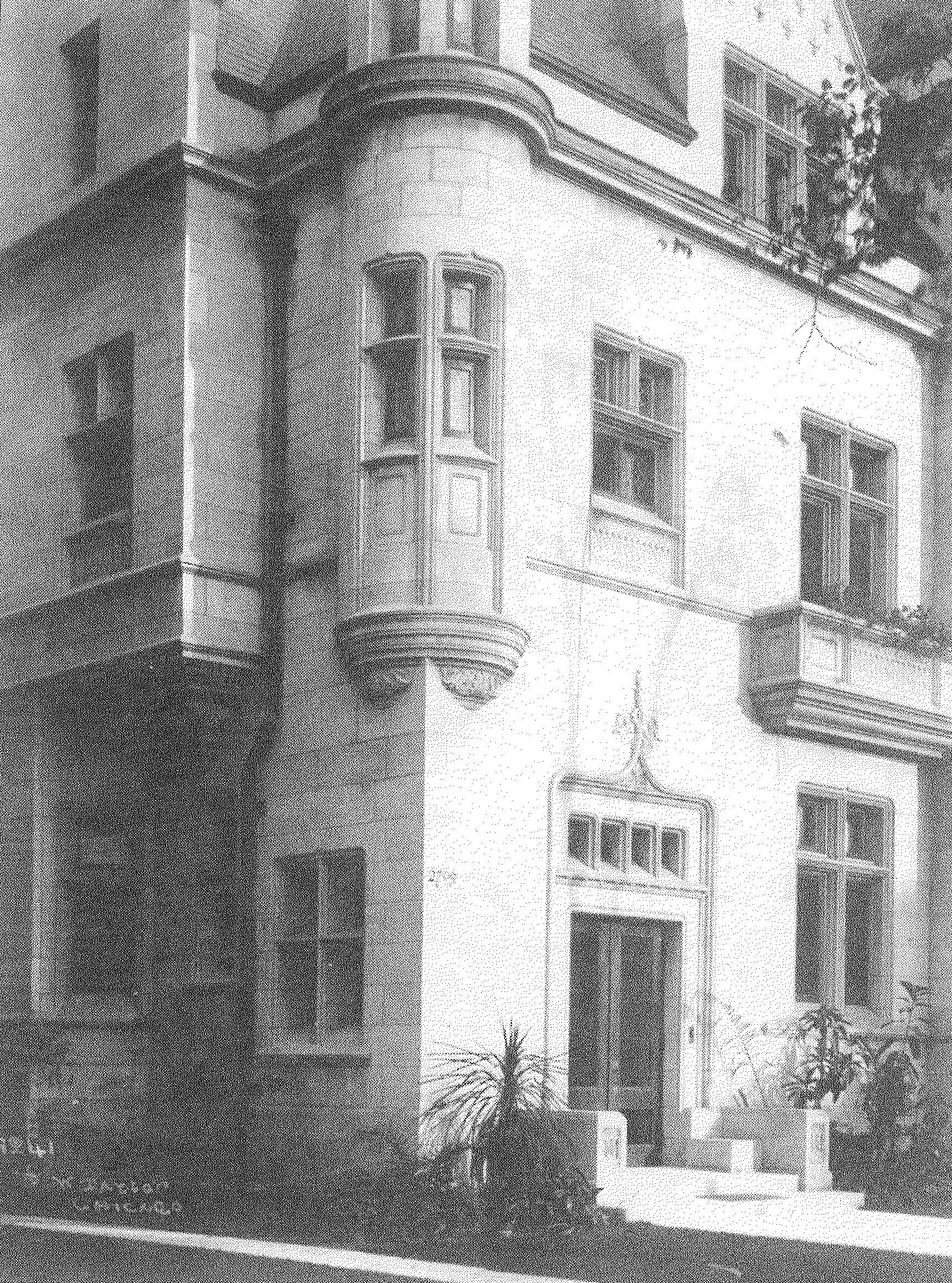
Charles and Frances Hutchinson were residents of Chicago's elite Prairie Avenue, living for over three decades in this house at 2709. The original house was designed in 1881 by George O. Garnsey and built in the Queen Anne style, and remodeled as shown here in 1888 to French Gothic tastes by Francis M. Whitehouse. After the neighborhood became less fashionable in the early years of the 20th century, the Hutchinsons moved to a cooperative apartment on E. Walton Place and their former home became a boarding house. It has since been demolished.

Hutchinson was born in Lynn, Massachusetts in 1854 to Benjamin P. Hutchinson (1828-1899) and Sarah (née Ingalls) Hutchinson (1833-1909), and relocated with his family to Chicago in 1856 after a brief stay in Milwaukee. In Chicago Benjamin Hutchinson founded Chicago Packing & Provision Co., which for many years was the leading meat processor in the United States. In 1863 he became one of the first directors of the First National Bank of Chicago and in 1881 founded the Corn Exchange Bank (with subsequent mergers and acquisitions now Bank of America) and as a member of the Chicago Board of Trade was known as one of the city's wealthiest and most colorful speculators. Charles graduated from the Chicago public schools in 1872 and entered the business world as a clerk in his father's office, becoming a junior partner with his father in 1875 in the firm B.P. Hutchinson and Son., commission merchants. Although he never attended college, he was a founding trustee and the first treasurer of the University of Chicago, positions he held until his death. He married Frances Angeline Kinsley, daughter of Herbert Milton Kinsley, on May 26, 1881. Herbert Kinsley had, in the last decades of the 19th Century, become one of Chicago's premier caterers and restaurateurs after having made his reputation during his peripatetic career in part by hosting a ball for the Prince of Wales at the Anglo-American Hotel in Hamilton, Ontario Canada.

Because of his contributions to the world of philanthropy, art and education Hutchinson was twice awarded honorary degrees by Tufts University, the first one a being a Master of Arts in 1901, and the second one an LL.D in 1920. Hutchinson was also the recipient of an honorary Master of Arts degree by Harvard University in 1915. For his service as consul general for Greece in Chicago during the World's Columbian Exposition, Hutchinson was awarded the Badge of the Order of the Redeemer by King George I of Greece in 1908. He was granted a knighthood by King Albert I of Belgium in 1919 for his work with the Belgian Relief Committee during World War I, and was a supporter of the founding of the League of Nations at the war's end.

Hutchinson served as Chairman, Committee of Fine Arts for the World's Columbian Exposition of 1893.

== The Art Institute of Chicago ==
"Established in 1879 from the remnants of a foundering art academy, the Art Institute of Chicago grew into a sturdy organization largely through the efforts of ... Hutchinson, who served as its president from 1882 to 1924." Although Hutchinson's personal wealth was generated thru banking, grain speculation and meatpacking enterprises that his father had established after coming to Chicago in 1856, Charles L. Hutchinson's "greatest enthusiasm was for art and the establishment and growth of the Art Institute". Founded on May 24, 1879 as The Chicago Academy of Fine Arts; The Art Institute assumed its present name in 1882. Hutchinson was a founding trustee of the Chicago Academy of Fine Arts, and recognizing his energy and vision, was named by the board of trustees as its first president three years later when it was renamed the Art Institute of Chicago. As one of many accolades conferred on Hutchinson by the Art Institute, the trustees passed a resolution On October 22, 1907, dedicating Gallery 32 as the Charles Lawrence Hutchinson Gallery of Old Masters to commemorate Hutchinson's twenty-fifth anniversary as president of the institution. After he died in 1924, his obituary notice in The Bulletin of the Art Institute noted that "His entire life was devoted to public service, but his service to the Art Institute was so intimate, his devotion so complete that it is not possible to measure it. He was The Art Institute, and it will stand as his most permanent monument".

=== The Art Institute on the move ===
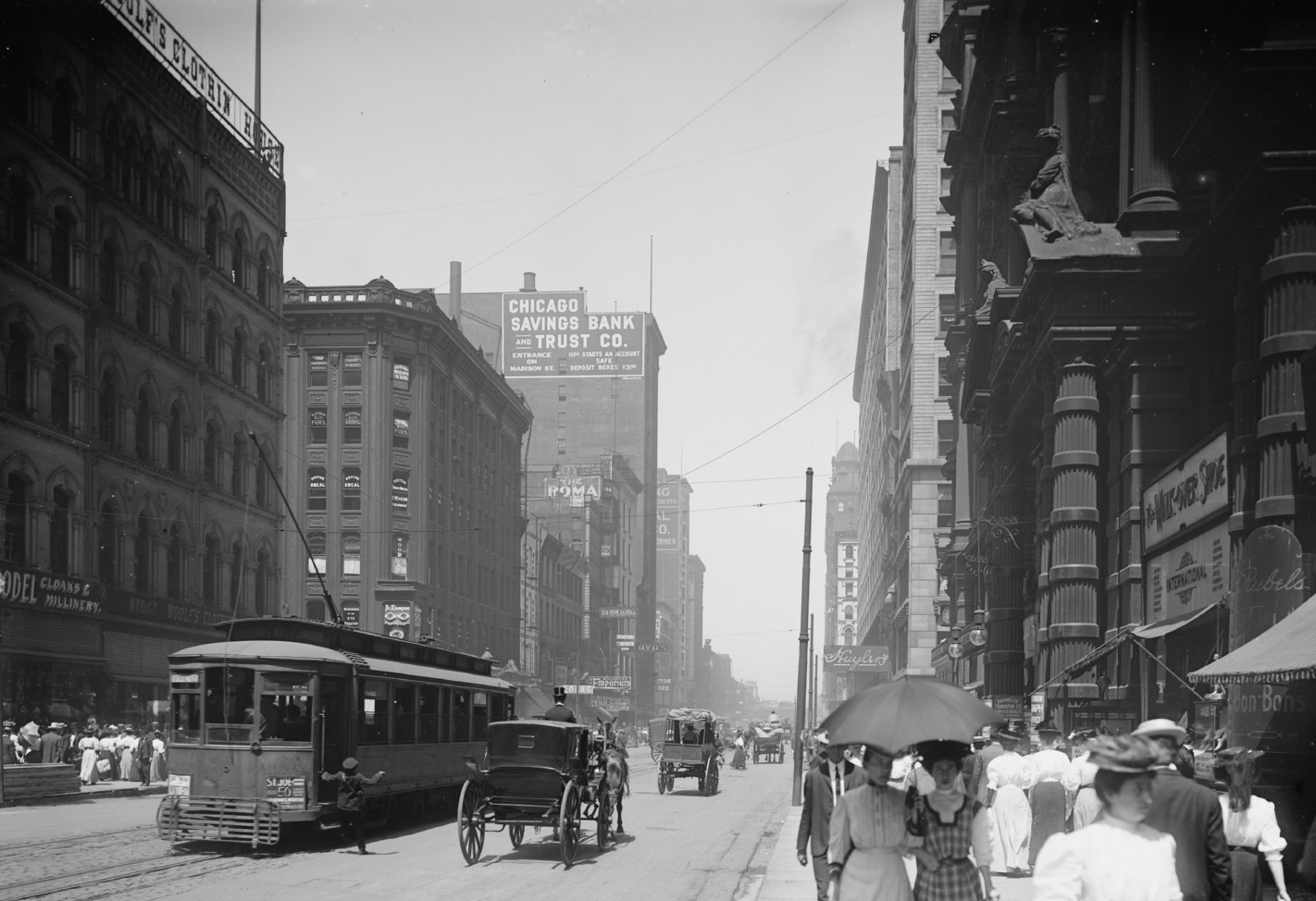
State Street looking north at Monroe c. 1900. Pike's Building at 170 (now 106 S.) State Street, where the Art Institute first opened its doors as The Academy of Fine Arts, is shown to the far left, with the second Palmer House (1873) directly across the street on the far right.

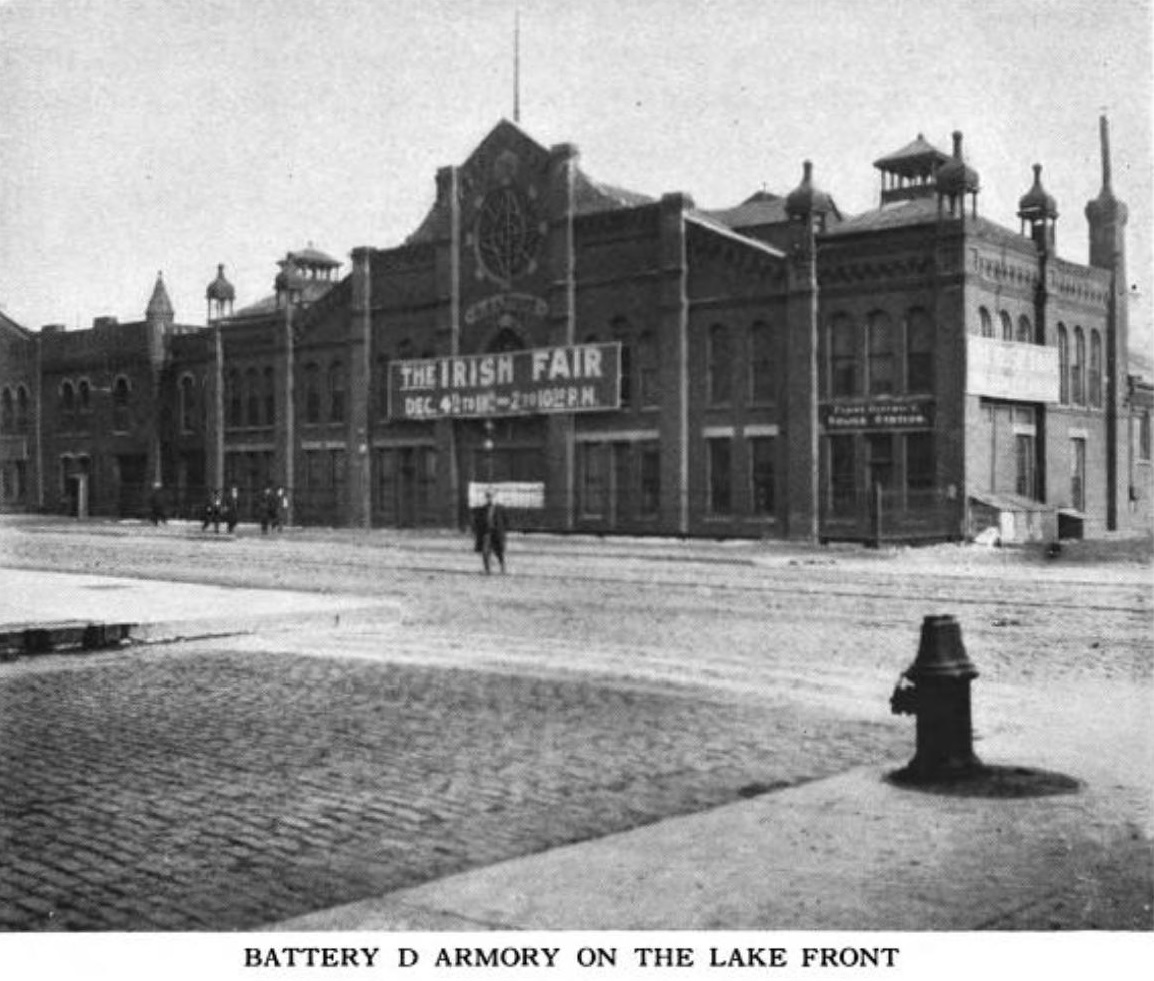
Battery D Armory stood on the east side of Michigan Avenue at Monroe Street. The building was used for various purposes, and "It appears that it occasionally required some pretty quick work to put the building into suitable condition for the morning art classes, after [the building] had been used the night before for a boxing match or a ball." It was demolished in 1896.

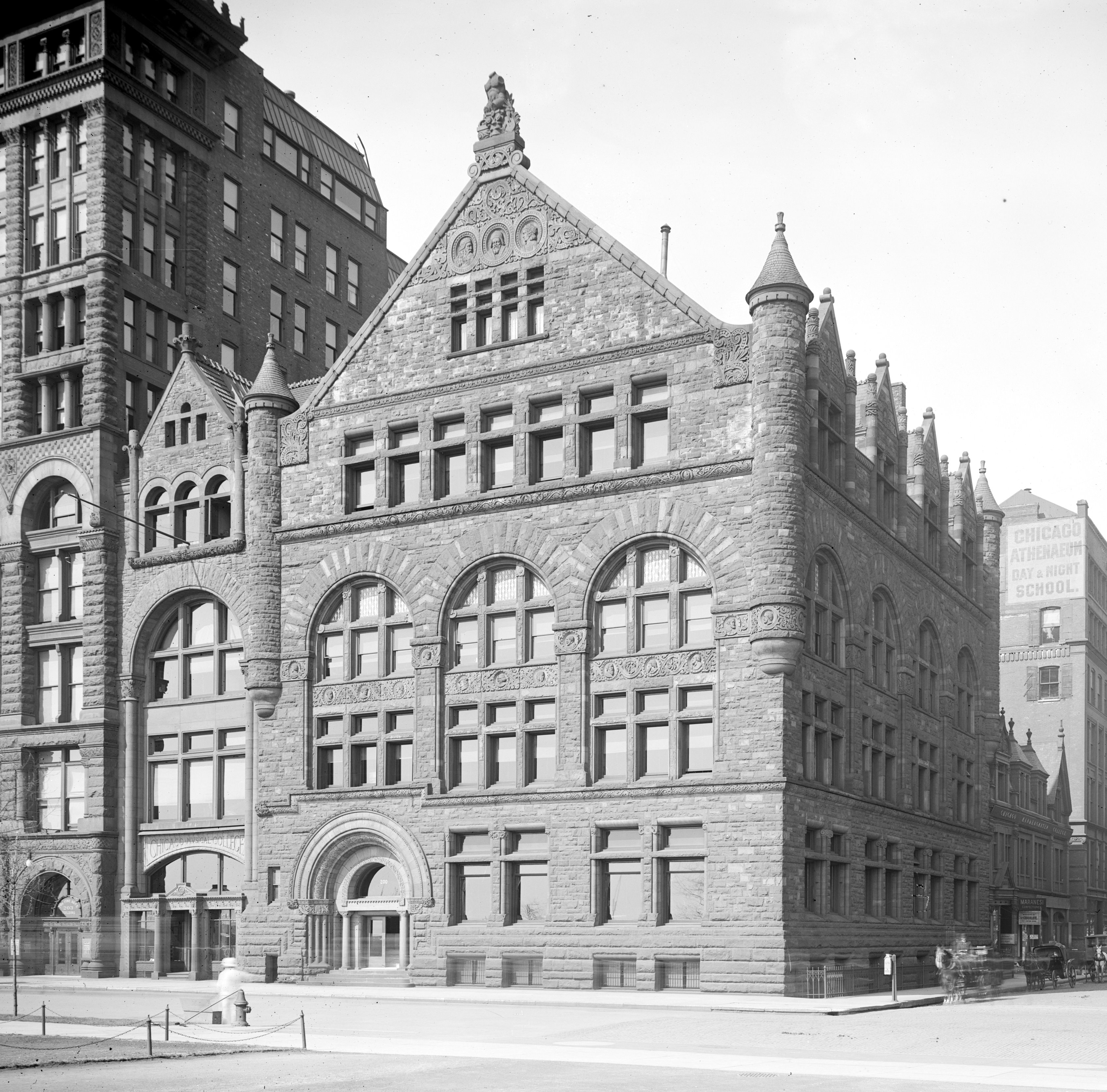
The John Wellborn Root-designed building at the southwest corner of Michigan and Van Buren, which opened in 1887. The building was sold to the Chicago Club in 1891 for $425,000, and collapsed during an extensive renovation of the property by the club in 1929.

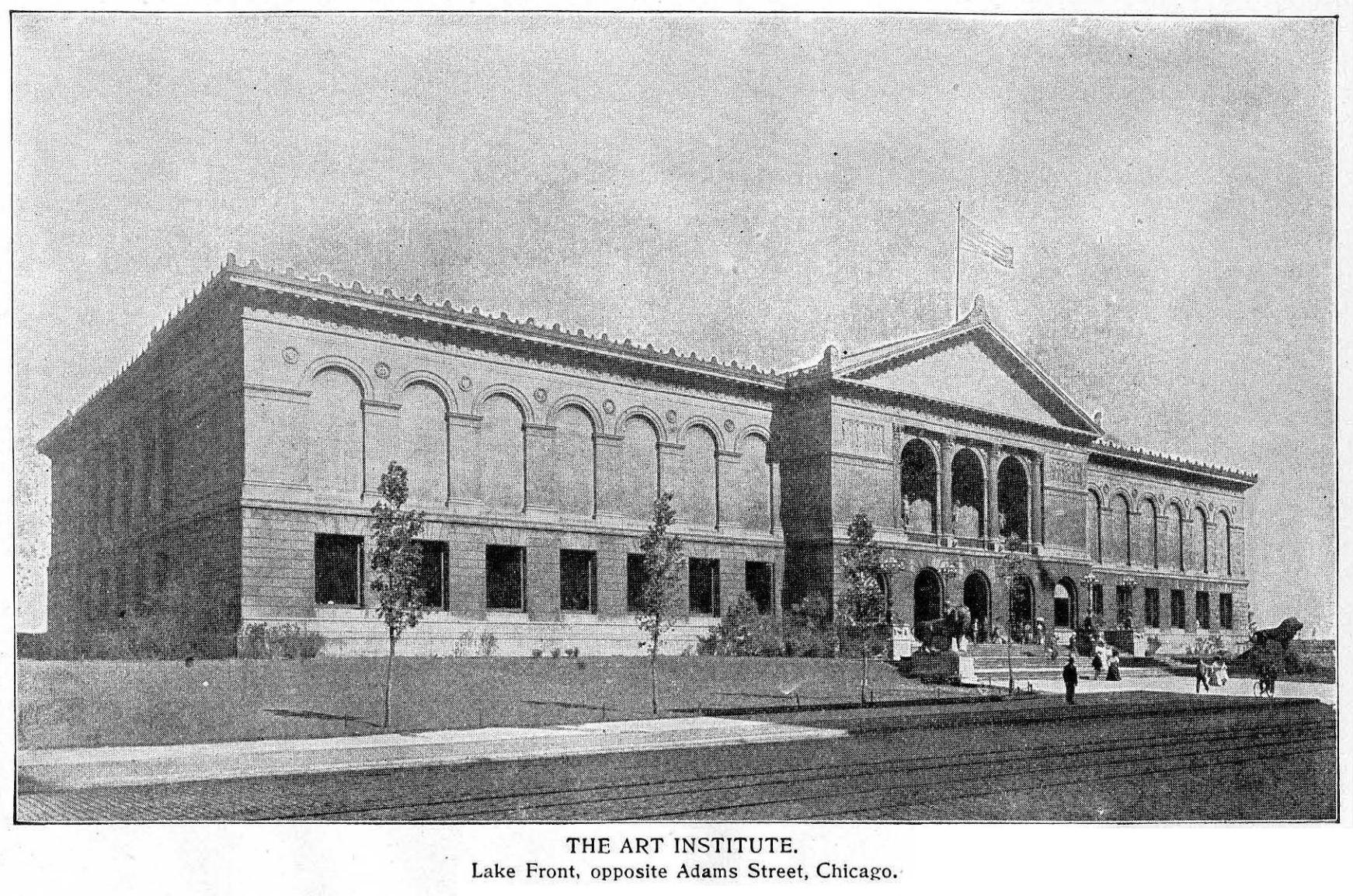
1902 exterior view of what is now the Allerton Building of the Art Institute of Chicago. Although the building was originally designed as a closed rectangle, it was initially constructed with a U-shaped footprint for lack of funds, with the area between the wings of the U in the back filled in 1895 with a temporary structure designed to house the classrooms of the School of the Art Institute. Alexander N. Fullerton Memorial Hall, with its Tiffany stained glass dome, was completed in 1898, and in 1901 the Ryerson Library was finished, funded with a $50,000 donation ($1.8 million in 2024) provided by Hutchinson's friend Martin Ryerson.

Charles L. Hutchinson saw the Art Institute thru every move and building program from the time of its founding until the time of his death in 1924. The institution's first headquarters were located in Pike's Building at 170 State St. in the rooms of the recently defunct Chicago Academy of Design. They remained there until May 1 of 1882, when Hutchinson recognized that the growth of the organization required a larger facility that featured more artist-friendly accommodation. At that time the group relocated to rooms on the second floor of the D Battery Armory on Michigan Avenue (located just north of where today the Allerton Building of the Art Institute is located). The drive for what was intended to be a permanent facility also began that year when Hutchinson acquired a lot at the southwest corner of Michigan Avenue and VanBuren Street that had built on it a two-story commercial building that was leased in part to a medical college, for which he advanced the Art Institute the purchase price of $45,000. The Art Institute moved its offices into the vacant part of the building, and subsequent to the purchase a three-story addition of pressed brick was built on the back portion of the lot. Classes moved from the armory into this new space on January 8, 1883 and these accommodations remained the extent of the Art Institute's real estate holdings until 1885, when the lot to the immediate south was acquired for expansion. Because of the organization's continued rapid growth the medical college building was demolished in 1885 and a new building by John Wellborn Root was built around the 1882 structure to provide more classrooms, galleries and museum space, with a portion of the building set aside for artistically-oriented tenants and organizations whose rent was intended to help pay for the new building and its operations. Contemporary news reports credited the efforts of Hutchinson as being the drive behind the construction of the new building and "the one man to whom the Art Institute owes its splendid status".

Under Hutchinson's watch, plans for expansion of the museum's collection and the building program continued unabated. He used his influence as an organizer of the World's Columbian Exposition to acquire property for a new building for the Art Institute on the east side of Michigan Avenue in Lake Park (today Grant Park) on landfill that had been created with debris from the Great Chicago Fire. On this property was then located a structure that was initially designed and built as a conference center for the fair, but that afterwards became the new home of the Art Institute. It was intended that proceeds from the sale of the VanBuren Street building and $200,000 from the directors of the fair would provide the Art Institute with "a permanent home for art works which will eclipse everything in the nature of fine structures Chicago has known hitherto". This new structure (now the Allerton Building) replaced the Exposition Building (built in 1873) that was standing on the site, and was designed by Shepley, Rutan and Coolidge, the later of whom was a friend of Hutchinson's having been the architect of Hutchinson Hall at the University of Chicago (1890). The Art Institute moved into the new structure in November 1893 after the fair closed, and Hutchinson spent the next several years leading the effort to reconfigure the interior of the new building. The work entailed the building of the Grand Staircase and the creation of space for the school, libraries, galleries, and the filling of that space with world-class art acquired locally or (more frequently) thru buying expeditions to Europe and Asia.

As the Art Institute was not able to provide Hutchinson with the generous purse that would be required for that purpose in those early days, this feat was effected thru Hutchinson's personal connections to Chicago's wealthiest families. An early coup in this regard for Hutchinson and Martin A. Ryerson, a fellow trustee and his frequent companion in these forays, was the 1889 purchase, "at great sacrifice" to the seller, of thirteen seventeenth century Dutch paintings that were purchased for $200,000, the money for which was advanced by Marshall Field, Philip Armour and others. The New York Press sniffed at this effort in what was perceived as an example of Chicago's cultural barbarism, considering the city's position as hog butcher to the world and its philistine reputation as a resolute accumulator of wealth for its own sake by whatever means: "He (Hutchinson) probably paid $1,000 a front foot for them, and we assume the citizens of Chicago will give him a triumphal procession when they arrive, carrying them and him in huge floats, drawn by teams of milk-white Berkshire hogs that have been newly washed with a ten inch hose jet of water until their pink flesh shows under the clean bristles." Hutchinson's connections would serve the Art Institute well over the next few decades. Among the notable additions to the museum's collection acquired through them included bequests by Bertha Palmer, Martin L. Ryerson and Clarence Buckingham, whose gifts would add resources which respectively formed the basis of the museum's notable Impressionist collection and augmented other collections with more than two hundred additional Old Master, Impressionist, and Post-Impressionist paintings and 1,400 Japanese woodblock prints.

In 1912 a bridge was built to span the by-then suppressed tracks of the Illinois Central Railroad that ran immediately behind the 1893 building, and in 1916 a two-story structure was built on top of it, funded with a $50,000 donation made by railroad inventor William H. Miner. This structure was named Gunsaulus Hall to honor Frank W. Gunsaulus, museum trustee and the first president of the Armour Institute, and housed the museum's industrial arts and related media collection (the Alsdorf Galleries today occupy the first floor of that space). By 1920 there were talks in earnest regarding the addition of McKlintock Court and the Hutchinson Wing which surrounds it and the Goodman Theater/Goodman School of Drama, which was a gift of the family of the playwright Kenneth S. Goodman, who died in 1918. Ground for the building of the latter pair (by Howard Van Doren Shaw) was broken in 1923 and the theater opened to the public in 1925.

== Affiliations ==
Hutchinson believed that a man's secret of success lie not only in "intense industry", but also in "his recreations [that] make or break him as surely as do his business habits". Over the course of his lifetime, Hutchinson was president, board member, trustee and/or supporter of perhaps as many as seventy commercial, civic and philanthropic institutions. Among those were included:

=== Business/commercial ===
- Chicago Board of Trade, president
- Chicago City Railway Co., director
- Commercial Club of Chicago, President, Vice-President, Treasurer
- Corn Exchange Bank, president
- Northern Trust Bank, director
- State Bank of Chicago (after mergers Chase Bank), founding director,
- Western Stone Company, director

=== Civic ===
- Chicago Auditorium Association, director, secretary
- Chicago Opera Association, treasurer
- Chicago Sanitary District, treasurer.
- Chicago Symphony Orchestra, trustee
- Citizen's Association of Chicago, treasurer
- Civic Music Association of Chicago, treasurer
- Fine Arts Committee, The World's Columbian Exposition, chairman and director
- Horticultural Society of Chicago (now the Chicago Horticultural Society), director
- Illinois Committee on Social Legislation, treasurer
- Republican Sanitary District Convention, delegate
- South Parks Commission, commissioner
- World's Columbian Exposition, committee of 100

=== Educational ===
- American Federation of Arts, founding president
- Art Institute of Chicago, trustee, president
- Carnegie Institute of Washington, trustee
- Chicago Manual Training School (University High School), treasurer
- Chicago Public Library, director
- Egypt Exploration Fund, vice-president
- Municipal Art League, treasurer
- National Art Association - Smithsonian Institution, vice-president
- National University, trustee
- University of Chicago, trustee, treasurer

=== Religious ===
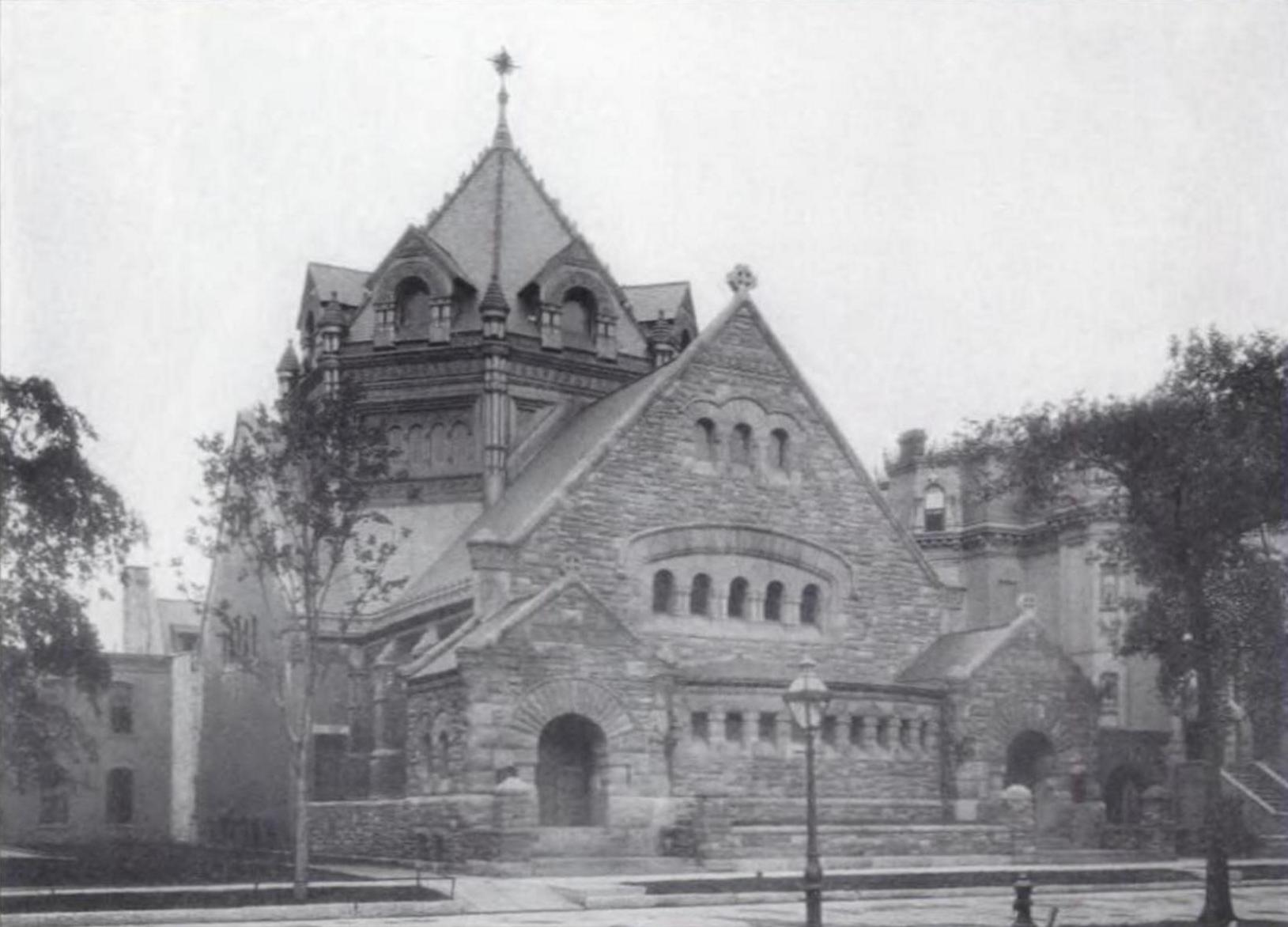
St. Paul Universalist Church, 3005 S. Prairie Avenue, 1887, Burling and Whitehouse, architects (demolished). The chapel was donated by Hutchinson and Harlow Higinbotham, who was a partner of Marshall Field and Company and would become the president of the World's Columbian Exposition and a founder of the Field Museum.

- St. Paul's Universalist Church, Sunday school superintendent, president

=== Philanthropic/reform ===
- American Vigilance Association, executive secretary and general counsel
- Chicago Nursery and Half-Orphan Society, president
- Chicago Orphan Asylum, president
- Chicago Peace Society, treasurer
- Hull House, director, treasurer
- Illinois Society for Mental Hygiene, treasurer
- Illinois Society for the Prevention of Blindness, president
- Immanuel Woman's Home Association, treasurer
- Immigrant's Protective League, treasurer
- Oakhaven Old People's Home (now Smith Senior Living), Committee of 100
- Old People's Home of the City of Chicago, trustee
- Presbyterian Hospital, trustee
- Rush Medical College, treasurer

=== Miscellaneous ===
- Cliff Dwellers Club, founder, treasurer

== Death ==
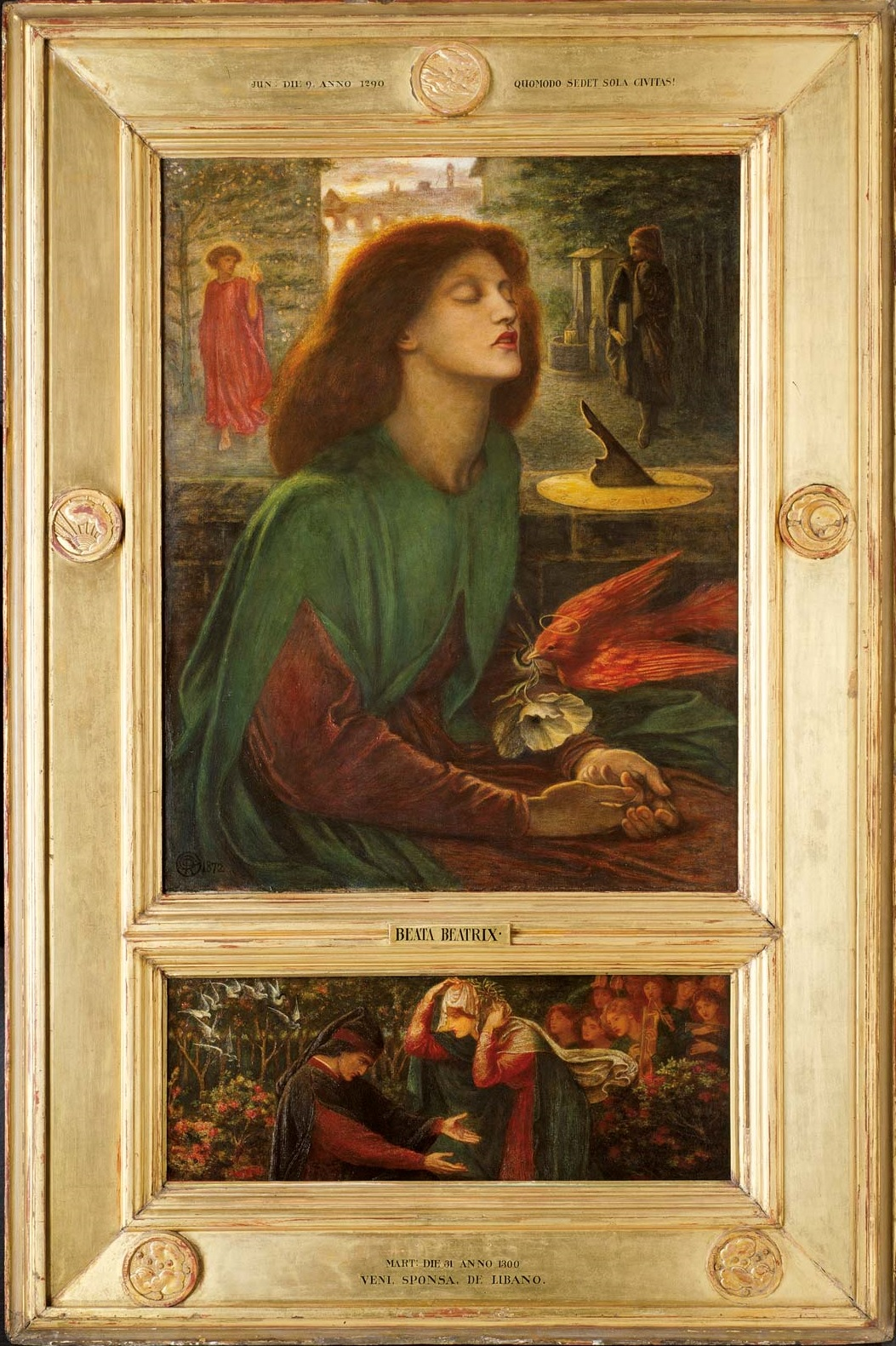
Beata Beatrix - Dante Gabriel Rossetti - Artist's rendition of his original painting but adding a predella depicting the artist and his wife (the model of the painting in the upper panel) meeting in paradise, with a frame designed by Rossetti. Hutchinson had acquired the painting in London for his private collection in 1883 and paid £ 1,200 for it (about $97,000 in 2015).

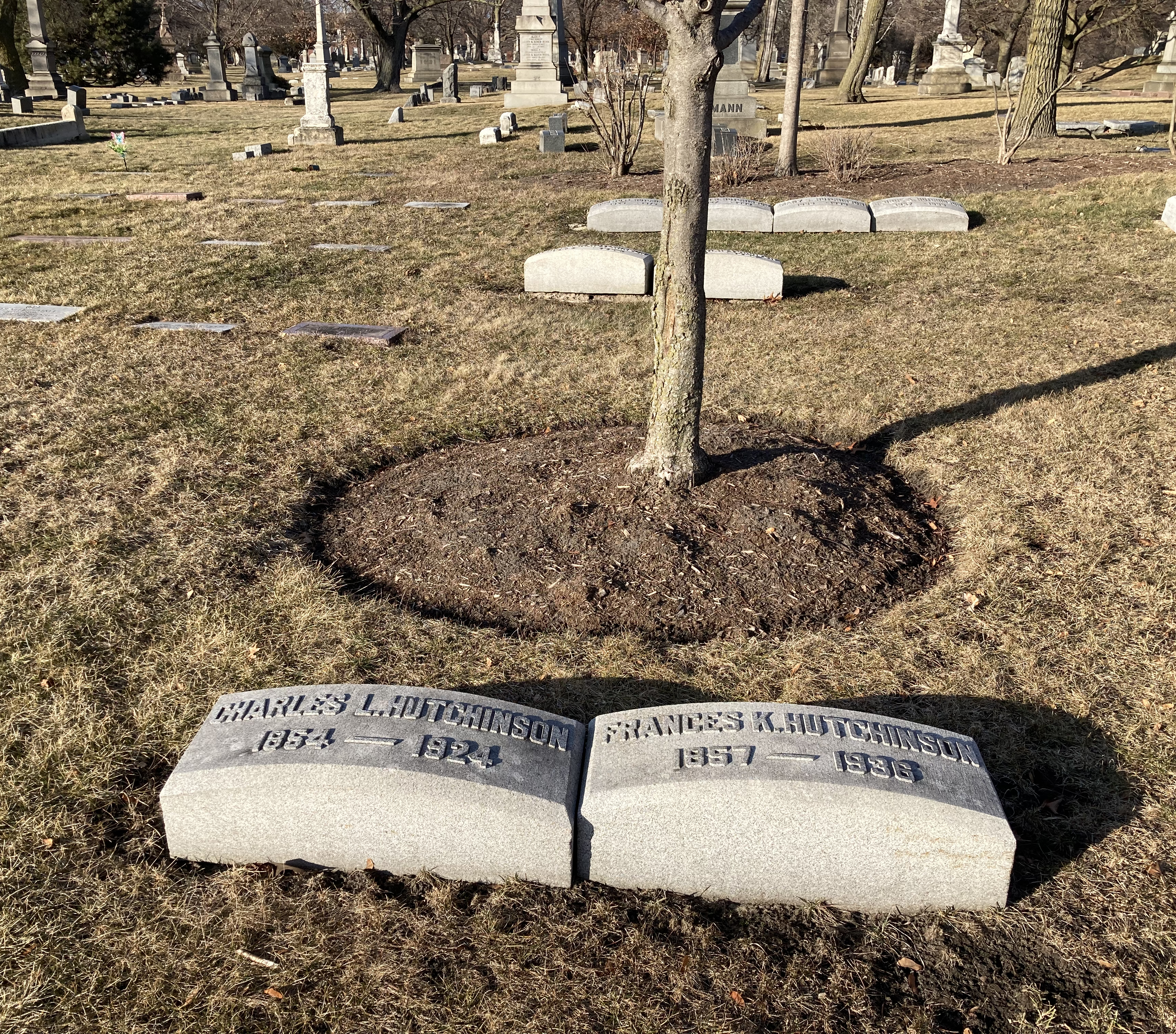
Hutchinson's grave at Graceland Cemetery

The Art Institute was never far from Hutchinson's mind, and on his deathbed he was heard remarking to a friend "I love to lie here and think of it -- of all it will do for the people in the years to come!" He died at Presbyterian Hospital in Chicago on October 7, 1924, after a brief attack of bronchial pneumonia, at which time he was remembered for the "many official positions [he held] in charitable, philanthropic and educational bodies." His will provided for generous donations to be made to the Art Institute, including twenty paintings from his private collection including those by:

- Rossetti (Beata Beatrix, 1871/72)
- Maes (Portrait of a Woman and Portrait of Pierre Corneille)
- Jacob Gerritsz. Cuyp (Self-Portrait)
- Corot (Farm at Seine-et-Oise)
- Daubigny (Bords de l'Oise à Anvers)
- Palamedesz. (Portrait of Jan Miclasz Gael)
- Watts (Time, Death and Judgement and Portrait of Joachim)
- Leys (Rembrandt's Studio)
- Ranger (Noank Shipyard and Brooklyn Bridge)
- Dupré (Cows in Stream)
- Fromentin (Arab Boys at Play)
- Teniers (Man Lighting a Pipe)
- Dias (Wood Interior and Forest Pool)
- Caspar Netscher (Lady at the Mirror)
- Aert van der Neer (Winter Sports on the Schie River)
- Hals (Portrait of Willem Van Heytheysen),

as well as a cash bequest in the amount of $95,000 (c. $1,685,000 in 2024). Hutchinson is buried at Chicago's Graceland Cemetery.
