= Utica Bridge =

- Coordinates: 41°19′39″N 89°00′39″W
- Crosses: Illinois River
- Locale: Utica, Illinois
- Official name: Utica Bridge
- Maintained by: Illinois Department of Transportation
- ID number: 000050008811417

Characteristics
- Design: Cantilever through truss
- Total length: 1,158 Feet, 378 Foot Longest Span
- Width: 30 Feet, 2 Lanes
- Height: 63 feet above water, 503 feet above sea level

History
- Opened: 1962
- Closed: Mar 18, 2021

Location
- Interactive map of Utica Bridge

The Utica Bridge was a cantilever through truss bridge in Utica, Illinois. Built in 1962, it was one of the few structures that survived the 2004 tornado. The bridge was demolished by implosion on March 18, 2021.
