= Helen C. Gunsaulus =

American curator

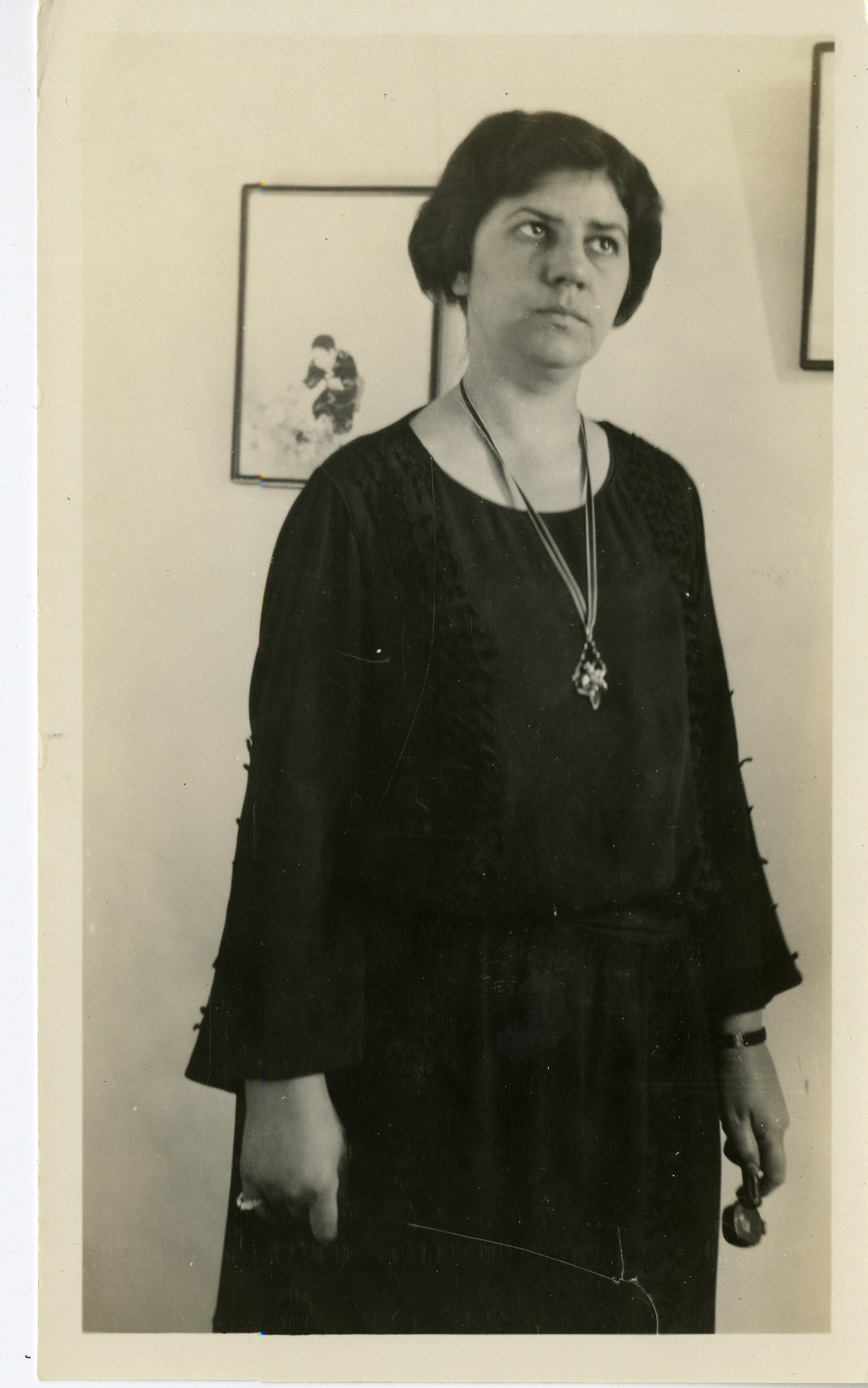
- Helen Cowen Gunsaulus, from the Smithsonian Institution Archives
- Born: April 6, 1886; Baltimore, Maryland, U.S.
- Died: August 1, 1954 (age 68); South Yarmouth, Massachusetts, U.S.
- Occupations: Curator, art historian
- Employer(s): Field Museum of Natural History (1919 to 1925); Art Institute of Chicago (1926 to 1943)
- Father: Frank W. Gunsaulus

Helen Cowen Gunsaulus (April 6, 1886 – August 1, 1954) was an American art historian based in Chicago. She was assistant curator of Japanese ethnology at the Field Museum of Natural History from 1919 to 1925, and Keeper of Japanese Prints at the Art Institute of Chicago from 1926 to 1943.

== Early life and education ==
Gunsaulus was born in Baltimore, Maryland, the youngest daughter of Frank W. Gunsaulus and Georgiana Long Gunsaulus. Her father was a well-known minister, philanthropist, and art collector. She graduated from the University of Chicago in 1908.

== Career ==
In 1919, Gunsaulus was appointed assistant curator of Japanese ethnology at the Field Museum of Natural History in Chicago. In 1926, she became Keeper of Japanese Prints at the Art Institute of Chicago. She retired from the Art Institute in 1943, and was succeeded as the Keeper of Japanese Prints by Margaret O. Gentles. She spoke to community organizations in the greater Chicago area and on Cape Cod about East Asian art.

== Publications ==
Most of Gunsaulus's published works were short essays for the Bulletin of the Art Institute of Chicago. She also published several pamphlets during her tenure at the Field Museum, and several books. Her final book was completed by Margaret O. Gentles and published posthumously. "[H]er heart was in her work and the drive to complete the tasks she had set for herself carried over the sufferings of the later months of her life and gave her the satisfaction of having much of it accomplished before death came", noted a 1955 report.

- The Japanese New Year's Festival, Games and Pastimes (1923, pamphlet)
- Japanese Sword-mounts in the Collections of Field Museum (1923)
- "Japanese Costume" (1923)
- Japanese Temples and Houses (1924, pamphlet)
- "Gods and Heroes of Japan" (1924)
- "The Japanese Sword and its Decoration" (1924)
- "A Painted Scroll of the Early Ukiyo-É School" (1930)
- "A Loan Collection of Japanese Netsuke" (1930)
- "Catalog of Japanese and Chinese Illustrated Books" (1931)
- "Turkish Embroideries" (1934)
- "Chinese Color Prints" (1936)
- "Frederick W. Gookin (1853-1936)" (1936, with Charles Fabens Kelly)
- "Pottery from Persia" (1936)
- "Nō Costume and Masks" (1936)
- "Early Hand-colored Prints of Japan" (1937)
- "Costumes Worn in the Nō Drama" (1937)
- "Japanese Fan Prints" (1938)
- "New Accessions in Japanese Prints" (1939)
- "The Frederick W. Gookin Memorial Collection" (1940)
- "An Exhibition of Japanese Priest Robes" (1940)
- "The Surviving Works of Sharaku" (1940)
- "Exhibition of Prints by Ichiryūsai Hiroshige" (1941)
- Japanese Textiles (1941)
- The Clarence Buckingham Collection of Japanese Prints Volume 1: The Primitives (1955, published posthumously)

== Personal life and legacy ==
Gunsaulus died in 1954, at the age of 68, in South Yarmouth, Massachusetts, where she lived with Helen F. MacKenzie, a fellow Chicagoan and art historian. She donated art and artifacts to the Art Institute of Chicago and to the Field Museum of Natural History.
