= George M. Reynolds =

American politician

George M. Reynolds (June 11, 1862 – December 19, 1935) was an American politician and businessman.

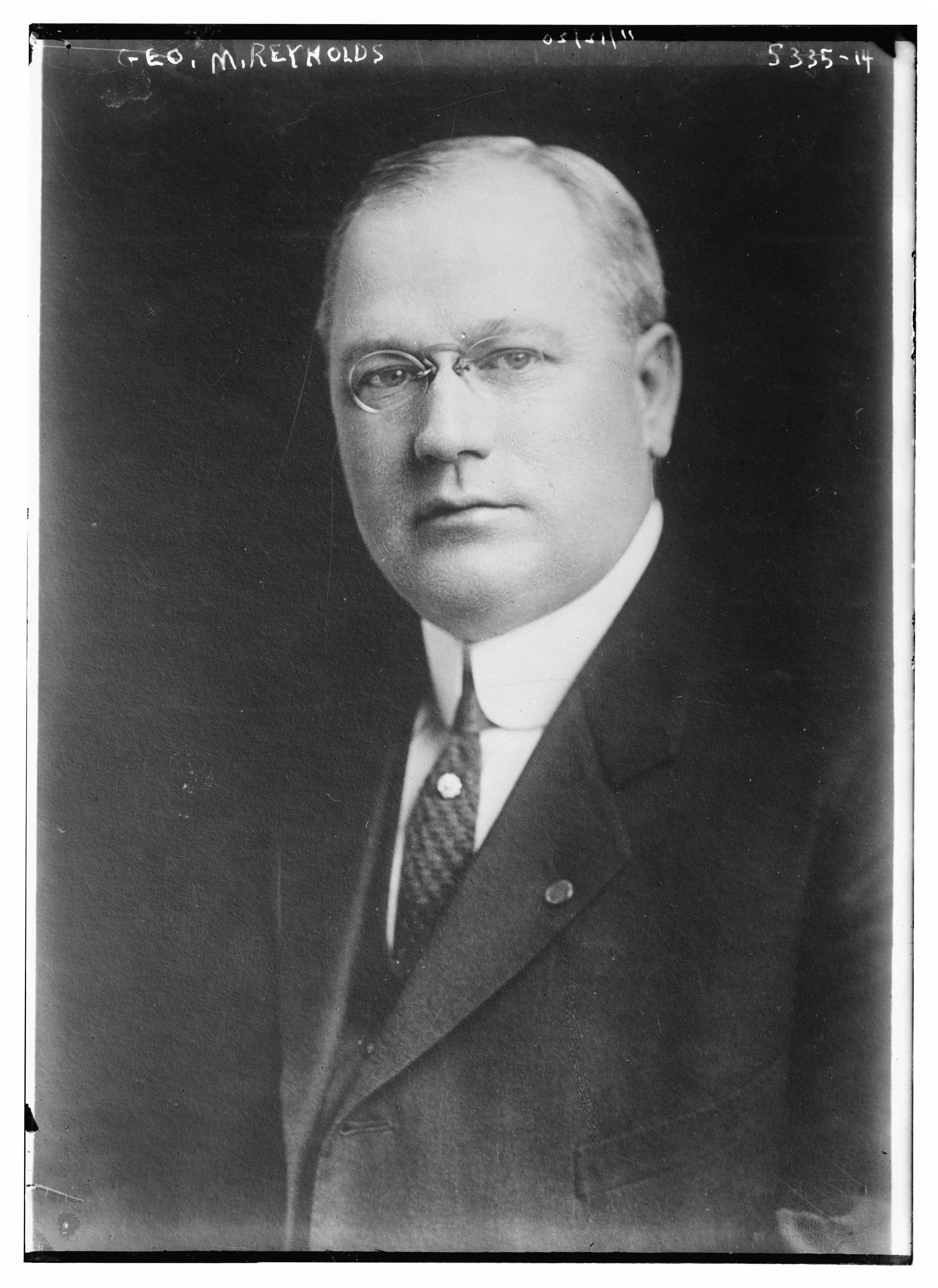
George M. Reynolds

Reynolds was born in LaSalle County, Illinois. He graduated from Illinois Wesleyan University and was a school teacher. Reynolds lived in Utica, Illinois. He was involved with the banking business and helped organized the Utica State Bank. Reynolds served as president of the Utica State Bank. Reynolds served on the La Salle County Board and served as the La Salle County Treasurer. Reynolds was a Republican. He served in the Illinois Senate from 1927 to 1930. He died at his home in Utica, Illinois from a short illness.
