= Utica Avenue (disambiguation) =

Utica Avenue may refer to:

- Utica Avenue, a major avenue in Brooklyn, New York City

== New York City Subway stations ==
- Crown Heights – Utica Avenue (IRT Eastern Parkway Line) at Eastern Parkway; serving the 2, 3, 4, and 5 trains
- Utica Avenue (IND Fulton Street Line) at Fulton Street; serving the A and C trains
- Reid Avenue (BMT Fulton Street Line), a demolished station on the BMT Fulton Street Line, at the intersection of Fulton Street, Utica Avenue, and the street formerly known as Reid Avenue (now Malcolm X Boulevard)

In addition, a Utica Avenue Line was proposed, but never built; see Proposed New York City Subway expansion (1929–1940)
