= Fox River Valley Ethanol =

Coordinates: 43°58′52″N 88°39′13″W

Fox River Valley Ethanol is a privately owned ethanol fuel plant located in Oshkosh, Wisconsin. Opened in the spring of 2003 by Utica Energy, the plant produces 52 million gallons of corn based fuel-grade ethanol yearly. Aside from ethanol, Fox River Valley Ethanol produces a number of high quality by-products such as CO_{2}, corn oil, and wet and dried distillers grains. Corn is provided to the plant by GB Elevator, and is sourced from local and regional corn producers. The plant was designed by Delta-T Corp.

Ace Ethanol acquired the facilities of Utica Energy LLC in 2013. The plant was renamed ″Fox River Valley Ethanol” at that time.
