= Utica Township, Chickasaw County, Iowa =

Utica Township
- Township
- Location in Chickasaw County
- Coordinates: 43°08′54″N 092°08′24″W
- Country: United States
- State: Iowa
- County: Chickasaw

Area
  - Total: 53.66 sq mi (138.97 km^{2})
  - Land: 53.66 sq mi (138.97 km^{2})
  - Water: 0 sq mi (0 km^{2}) 0%
- Elevation: 1,106 ft (337 m)

Population (2000)
  - Total: 525
  - Density: 9.8/sq mi (3.8/km^{2})
- GNIS feature ID: 0468851

Utica Township is one of twelve townships in Chickasaw County, Iowa, USA. As of the 2000 census, its population was 525.

== History ==
Utica Township was organized in 1858.

== Geography ==
Utica Township covers an area of 53.66 square miles (139.0 km^{2}) and contains no incorporated settlements. According to the USGS, it contains six cemeteries: Little Turkey, North, Sacred Heart, Saint Marys Catholic of Little Turkey, Saint Marys and Saude Lutheran.
