= North Utica, Illinois =

- Village
- North Utica
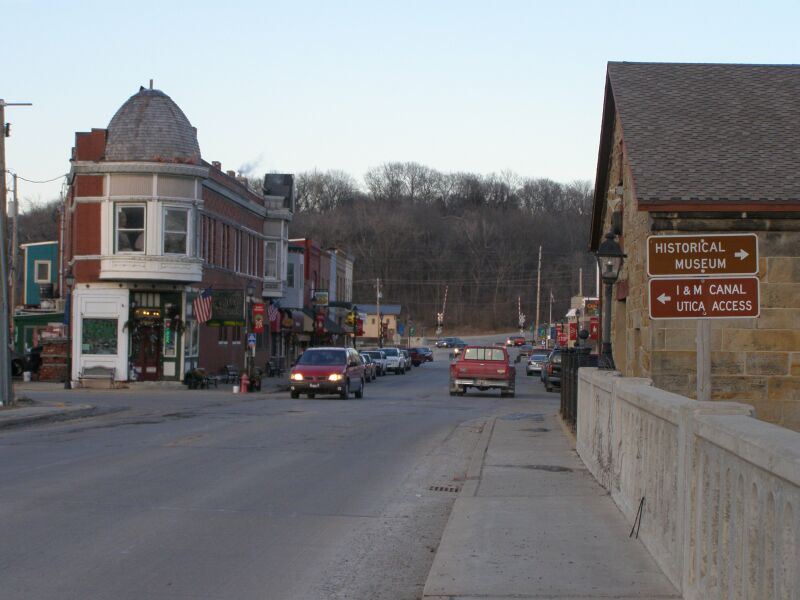
- Looking north through Utica
- Motto: "Historical Past Promising Future"
- Location of North Utica in LaSalle County, Illinois.
- Coordinates: 41°22′15″N 89°00′12″W
- Country: United States
- State: Illinois
- County: LaSalle
- Township: Utica

Area
  - Total: 3.47 sq mi (8.98 km^{2})
  - Land: 3.46 sq mi (8.95 km^{2})
  - Water: 0.012 sq mi (0.03 km^{2})
- Elevation: 617 ft (188 m)

Population (2020)
  - Total: 1,323
  - Density: 382.9/sq mi (147.84/km^{2})
- Time zone: UTC-6 (CST)
  - Summer (DST): UTC-5 (CDT)
- ZIP Code: 61373
- Area codes: 815 and 779
- FIPS code: 17-54222
- GNIS feature ID: 2399524
- Website: www.utica-il.gov

North Utica, often known as Utica, is a village in Utica Township, LaSalle County, Illinois. The population was 1,323 at the 2020 census. It is part of the Ottawa Micropolitan Statistical Area.

While North Utica is the proper name for the city, advertising on nearby Interstates 80 and 39 refers to the village by its original name, Utica. In addition, people who live in the area, official Interstate signage, and signs indicating the city limits all refer to the town as Utica.

== History ==
The town of Utica had previously been established on the banks of the Illinois River near the Indian village Kaskaskia during the 1830s, but flooding and the construction of the Illinois and Michigan Canal a few miles north encouraged redevelopment of the village there as North Utica.

=== 2004 tornado ===
An F3 tornado struck Utica on April 20, 2004, heavily damaging the downtown business district, causing $8 million in damage and killing 8, with another indirect fatality officially recognized by the village.

=== Fire at Grand Bear Resort ===
A 2022 Memorial Day fire damaged twenty eight privately owned cabins near the entrance to Starved Rock State Park likely because of a grill fire. The Grand Bear lodge, waterpark and a majority of the cabins and villas on site were not affected.

== Geography ==
According to the 2021 census gazetteer files, North Utica has a total area of 3.47 square miles (8.99 km^{2}), of which 3.46 square miles (8.96 km^{2}) (or 99.68%) is land and 0.01 square miles (0.03 km^{2}) (or 0.32%) is water.

== Demographics ==
Historical population
Census	Pop.	Note	%±
1880	767		—
1890	1,094		42.6%
1900	1,150		5.1%
1910	976		−15.1%
1920	1,037		6.3%
1930	1,120		8.0%
1940	1,019		−9.0%
1950	985		−3.3%
1960	1,014		2.9%
1970	974		−3.9%
1980	1,067		9.5%
1990	848		−20.5%
2000	977		15.2%
2010	1,352		38.4%
2020	1,323		−2.1%
U.S. Decennial Census

=== 2020 census ===
As of the 2020 census, North Utica had a population of 1,323. The median age was 43.9 years. 23.5% of residents were under the age of 18 and 18.1% of residents were 65 years of age or older. For every 100 females there were 99.5 males, and for every 100 females age 18 and over there were 94.2 males age 18 and over.

0.0% of residents lived in urban areas, while 100.0% lived in rural areas.

There were 523 households in North Utica, of which 31.0% had children under the age of 18 living in them. Of all households, 56.8% were married-couple households, 15.9% were households with a male householder and no spouse or partner present, and 21.0% were households with a female householder and no spouse or partner present. About 25.0% of all households were made up of individuals and 10.5% had someone living alone who was 65 years of age or older.

There were 570 housing units, of which 8.2% were vacant. The homeowner vacancy rate was 0.5% and the rental vacancy rate was 14.9%.

As of the 2020 census, there were 330 families residing in the village. The population density was 381.71 inhabitants per square mile (147.38/km^{2}), and the average housing-unit density was 164.45 per square mile (63.49/km^{2}).

Racial composition as of the 2020 census
Race	Number	Percent
White	1,208	91.3%
Black or African American	4	0.3%
American Indian and Alaska Native	3	0.2%
Asian	4	0.3%
Native Hawaiian and Other Pacific Islander	0	0.0%
Some other race	9	0.7%
Two or more races	95	7.2%
Hispanic or Latino (of any race)	73	5.5%

=== Income and poverty ===
The median income for a household in the village was $87,946, and the median income for a family was $98,750. Males had a median income of $86,667 versus $38,929 for females. The per capita income for the village was $40,113. About 1.2% of families and 2.7% of the population were below the poverty line, including none of those under age 18 and 6.0% of those age 65 or over.

== Attractions ==
Local attractions include Grizzly Jack's Grand Bear Resort, Starved Rock Entertainment Indoor Playland and Escape Rooms and Starved Rock State Park.

Utica is the location of the annual Burgoo Festival on Columbus Day weekend in October. The Burgoo Festival is a fundraising event hosted by the LaSalle County Historical Society.

== Transportation ==
While there is no fixed-route transit service in North Utica, intercity bus service is provided by Burlington Trailways in nearby Peru.

== Notable people ==
- Leo Cahill, pro football coach and executive
- George M. Reynolds, Illinois state senator and businessman
