= Utica Township, LaSalle County, Illinois =

Coordinates: 41°20′43″N 88°59′03″W

Utica Township
- Township
- Location in LaSalle County

- LaSalle County's location in Illinois
- Country: United States
- State: Illinois
- County: LaSalle
- Established: November 6, 1849

Area
  - Total: 18.74 sq mi (48.5 km^{2})
  - Land: 18.01 sq mi (46.6 km^{2})
  - Water: 0.73 sq mi (1.9 km^{2}) 3.92%

Population (2020)
  - Total: 1,915
  - Density: 106.3/sq mi (41.05/km^{2})
- Time zone: UTC-6 (CST)
  - Summer (DST): UTC-5 (CDT)
- FIPS code: 17-099-77096

Utica Township is located in LaSalle County, Illinois. As of the 2020 census, its population was 1,915 and it contained 836 housing units.

== Geography ==
According to the 2021 census gazetteer files, Utica Township has a total area of 18.74 square miles (48.54 km^{2}), of which 18.01 square miles (46.65 km^{2}) (or 96.08%) is land and 0.73 square miles (1.89 km^{2}) (or 3.92%) is water.

== Demographics ==
As of the 2020 census there were 1,915 people, 730 households, and 572 families residing in the township. The population density was 102.18 inhabitants per square mile (39.45/km^{2}). There were 836 housing units at an average density of 44.61 per square mile (17.22/km^{2}). The racial makeup of the township was 90.39% White, 0.42% African American, 0.21% Native American, 0.73% Asian, 0.00% Pacific Islander, 0.94% from other races, and 7.31% from two or more races. Hispanic or Latino of any race were 6.06% of the population.

There were 730 households, out of which 33.80% had children under the age of 18 living with them, 69.18% were married couples living together, 6.71% had a female householder with no spouse present, and 21.64% were non-families. 16.20% of all households were made up of individuals, and 8.20% had someone living alone who was 65 years of age or older. The average household size was 2.57 and the average family size was 2.90.

The township's age distribution consisted of 25.0% under the age of 18, 3.4% from 18 to 24, 21.9% from 25 to 44, 33.6% from 45 to 64, and 16.3% who were 65 years of age or older. The median age was 44.9 years. For every 100 females, there were 93.6 males. For every 100 females age 18 and over, there were 95.4 males.

The median income for a household in the township was $97,614, and the median income for a family was $111,190. Males had a median income of $71,538 versus $41,779 for females. The per capita income for the township was $42,429. About 0.7% of families and 1.6% of the population were below the poverty line, including 0.0% of those under age 18 and 3.9% of those age 65 or over.

Historical population
Census	Pop.	Note	%±
2010	2,052		—
2020	1,915		−6.7%
U.S. Decennial Census
