= Southern New England Algonquian cuisine =

Southern New England Algonquian cuisine comprises the shared foods and preparation methods of the indigenous Algonquian peoples of the southern half of New England, which consists of Massachusetts, Connecticut, Rhode Island, but also included portions of coastal New Hampshire and Long Island, now part of New York, as a cultural and culinary region. The peoples of the region historically shared related languages in the Southern New England Algonquian (SNEA) division of the Eastern branch of Algonquian languages as well as related cultures and spiritual practices.

Regional variations were slight, mostly based on small differences in times of abundance or availability of certain ingredients due to location and the variations in microclimate. The New England climate, with its marked seasons and long winters meant that seasonality of ingredients and preservation of foods to survive the coldest times of year when little food was available were important aspects of the cuisine. The diet mainly consisted of agricultural staples such as the 'Three Sisters' of maize, beans and squash, augmented with the additions of meat, shellfish, game and various plants that were foraged from the surrounding area.

The adoption of many of the foods and dishes by the English settlers had a pronounced effect on New England cuisine, and many dishes and foods enjoyed in the region today were the result of Native influences from SNEA cuisine. The Native peoples of the region in turn adopted and adapted many of the foods of the Pilgrim and Puritan settlers, and the cuisines of the Indians and the settlers merged. Foods such as clam chowder, baked beans, succotash and corn on the cob are part of the traditional repertoires of contemporary Native and non-Native households in the region.

== History ==
=== Hunting and gathering ===
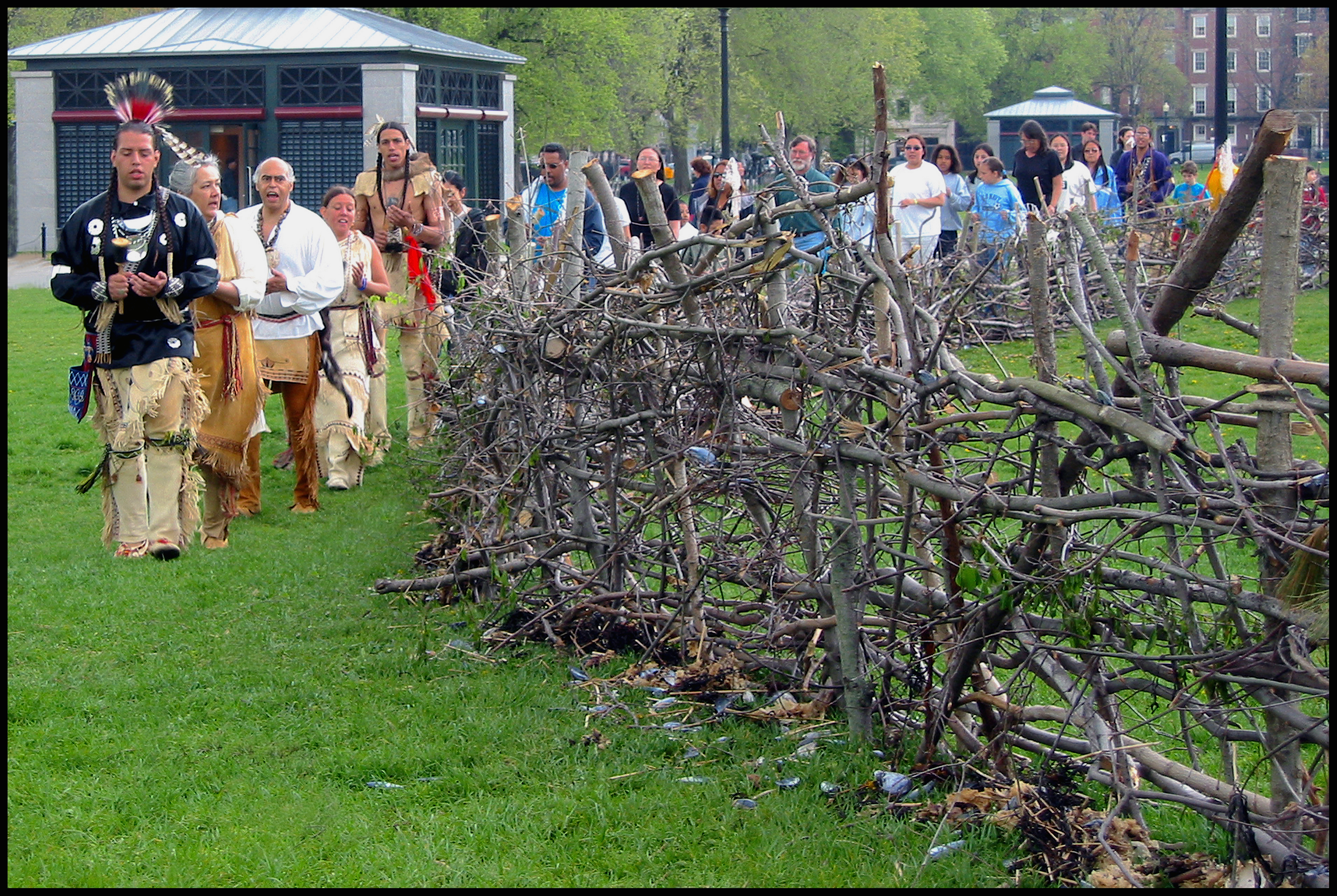
Massachusett and Wampanoag peoples gather with Boston students around a recreation of a fish-weir. Built over rivers or inlets, weirs channeled the fish so they could be more easily caught.

Before agriculture, hunting, fishing, and foraging were the only methods of sustenance. The earliest evidence of these activities in New England begin after 13000 BC when the Paleo-Indians followed the Pleistocene megafauna, such as the mastodon onto the newly exposed tundra in the wake of the receding Wisconsin Glacier. Over-hunting and warming climate led to the extinction of the megafauna, and sites throughout New England show heavy reliance on following herds of caribou, although smaller numbers of moose, deer, hare, fox and marine mammals along the coast were also taken. Foraged foods likely included tubers of marsh plants and the leaves and seeds of chenopods.

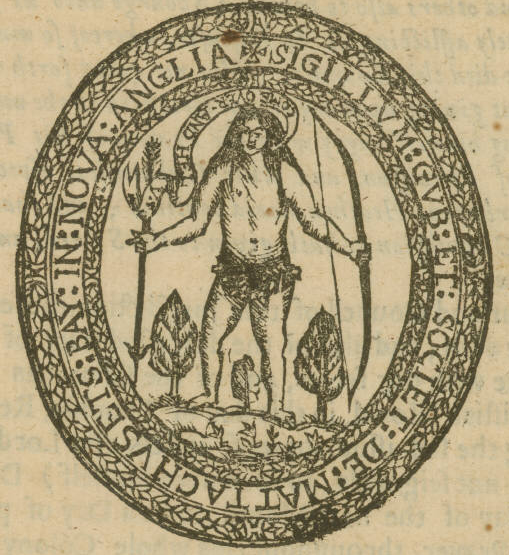
The colonial seal of Massachusetts Bay from 1676, depicts a Massachusett man with a bow and arrow. The bow and arrow first appeared in New England around 700 AD.

The start of the Archaic Period ushered in a very volatile time as the climate rapidly warmed. The tundra had transitioned into a shrubby, cold savannah, then an open forest and finally the mosaic of mixed deciduous and coniferous trees today. Sea levels rapidly rose due to the melting glaciers inundating some areas whereas isostatic rebound exposed new lands and raised the elevations of other areas. By 7000 BC, the migratory patterns of fish and birds and most of the species of flora and fauna associated with New England today had established in the region.

The population increased in the Archaic Period, due to migrations of people from the southwest and because of the greater carrying capacity of the land due to numerous trees producing oily nuts, which were a major food source, and improved hunting technology. The Archaic Period peoples adopted the atlatl, which allowed hunters to throw spears from a greater distance and with greater force, and had developed a more diverse set of stone points and carved hooks tailored to the species that were targeted. By the late part of the Archaic Period, most of the foods known to be gathered up until the arrival of the first settlers were utilized at this time, particularly shellfish as evidenced from the large shell middens that occupy numerous coastal sites in Rhode Island and southeastern Massachusetts.

Even with the development of agriculture, which ushered in the Woodland Period around 1000 BC, the Southern New England Algonquian peoples continued to rely on long-held hunting, fishing, collecting and foraging activities to supplement their diets. Food preparation was facilitated with the adoption of ceramic pottery around 500 AD. The new pots were lighter in weight, easier to produce and heated faster than stone vessels. The adoption of the bow and arrow around 700 AD greatly improved hunting prowess, as bow-and-arrow hunting was more stealthy than traditional spear and spear-throwing methods. In areas such as the colder, rocky uplands and sandy shoals, where agriculture was greatly hampered, reliance on hunting and foraging assumed greater importance but even in the most fertile areas, these activities were elemental to survival when food stores were thin at the end of winter or when crops failed due to drought, pest or early frost.

=== Adoption of agriculture ===
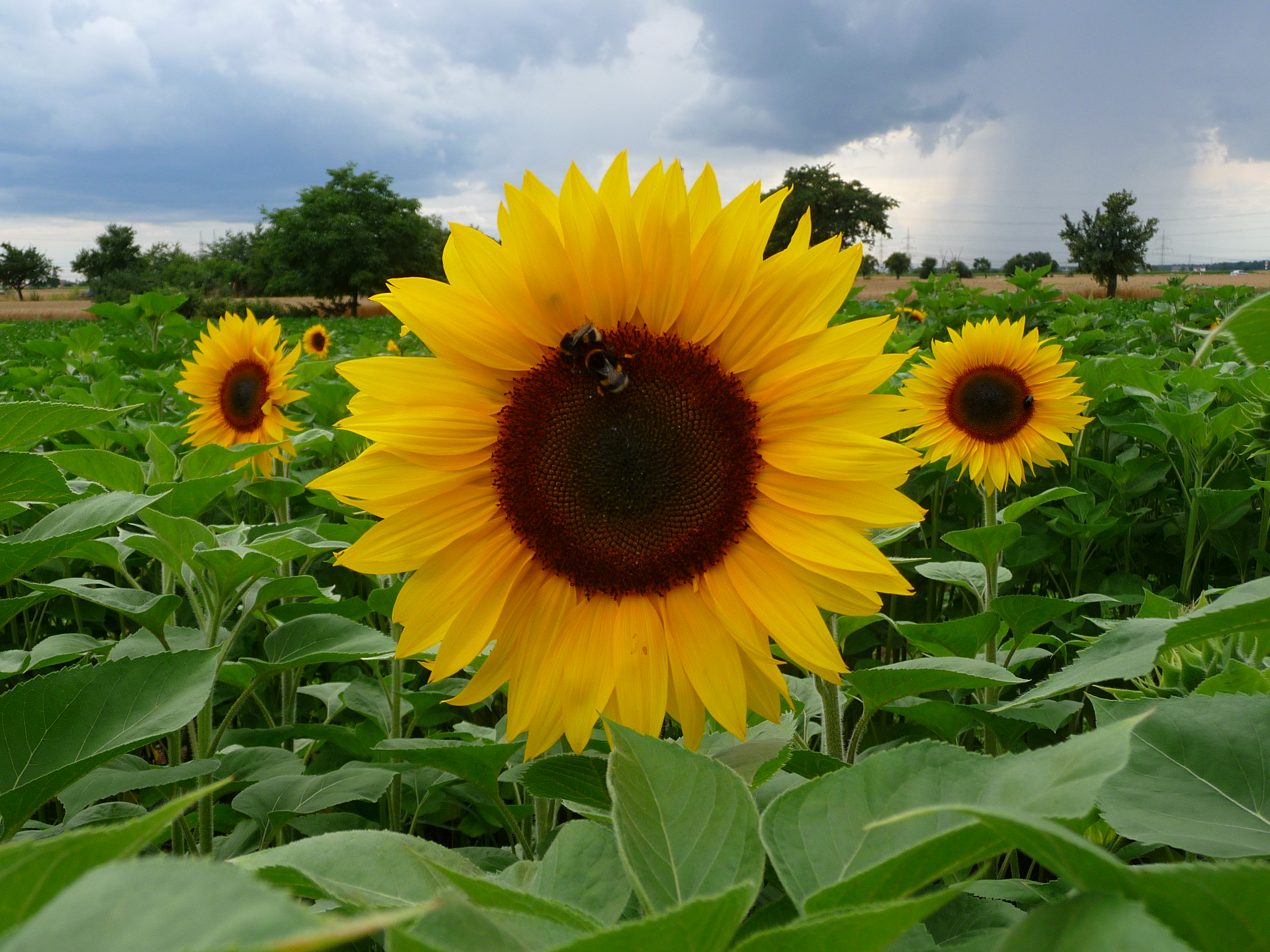
Introduced around the globe, the sunflower was one of the few crops of the Eastern Agricultural Complex not replaced by the Three Sisters.

Agriculture developed in eastern North America independently with a series of domestication events, with the crops and methods of growing them spread by trade routes. Crops included starchy, grain-like seeds of little barley, maygrass, goosefoot (similar to quinoa) and erect knotweed, although the latter two crops were also eaten as leafy vegetables. Oils were extracted from marsh elder and sunflower seeds and the meal was added to bread. Other crops include the tubers of the Jerusalem artichoke and Cucurbita pepo, ancestor of various pumpkins, melons and squashes, but the first domesticated varieties were used mainly for gourds and edible seeds.

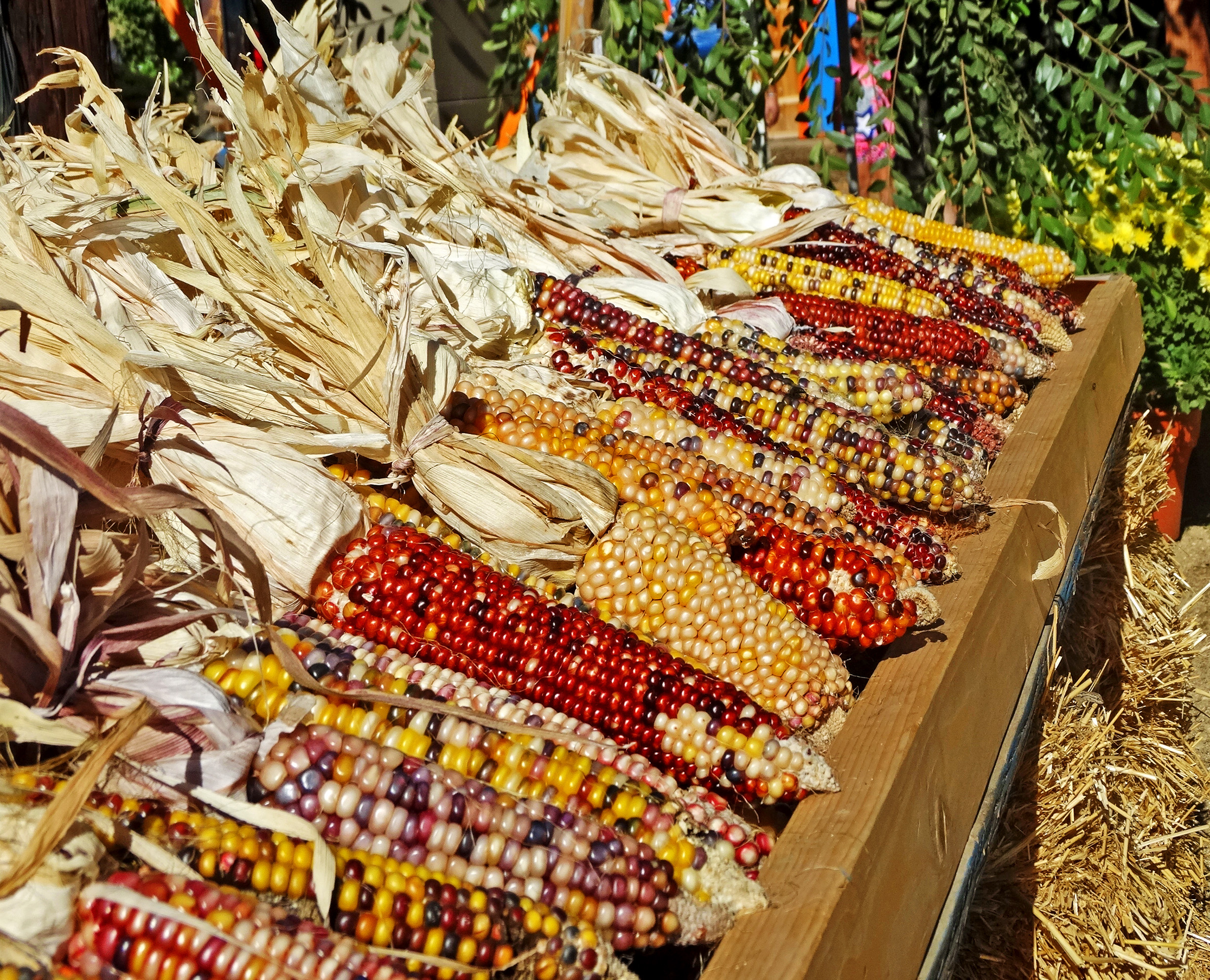
The multi-colored 'Indian corn' once common in New England for food. Originally from Central America, took several centuries to develop varieties of corn that thrived in the local climate.

Around 500 AD, the tropical Three Sisters of maize, beans and squash originally domesticated in Mesoamerica had reached New England. By 1100 AD, these crops had replaced the earlier crops of the Eastern Agricultural Complex, although they continued to be gathered in the wild. The yields of the Three Sisters per acreage was significantly higher, but only after varieties adapted to the colder climate and shorter growing season. New varieties of C. pepo were introduced with edible flesh, now the familiar pumpkins, squashes and melons still grown in New England today. Although foods hunted and gathered from the wild, fish and shellfish supplemented the diet, for coastal peoples, it represented a bulk of the caloric intake.

The adoption of the Three Sisters was spread by migrations of people originally from southern Ontario and western New York, corroborated by the spread of the Point Peninsula complex of pottery into New England from the west as well as the intrusion of Algonquian genetic profiles into the population during the middle Woodland Period around 200 BC. The inhabitants of New England during the Archaic Period shared genetic profiles more closely associated with Catawba and Waccamaw people, but had absorbed the Algonquian migrants adopting their culture. Later, migrations of Iroquoian peoples into what is now New York and the Great Lakes isolated the Algonquian peoples of New England from elsewhere, leading to the development of the Eastern Algonquian languages. By the Woodland Period, the culture and the ethnic divisions at the time were more or less still in place by the time of European contact.

== Regional variation ==
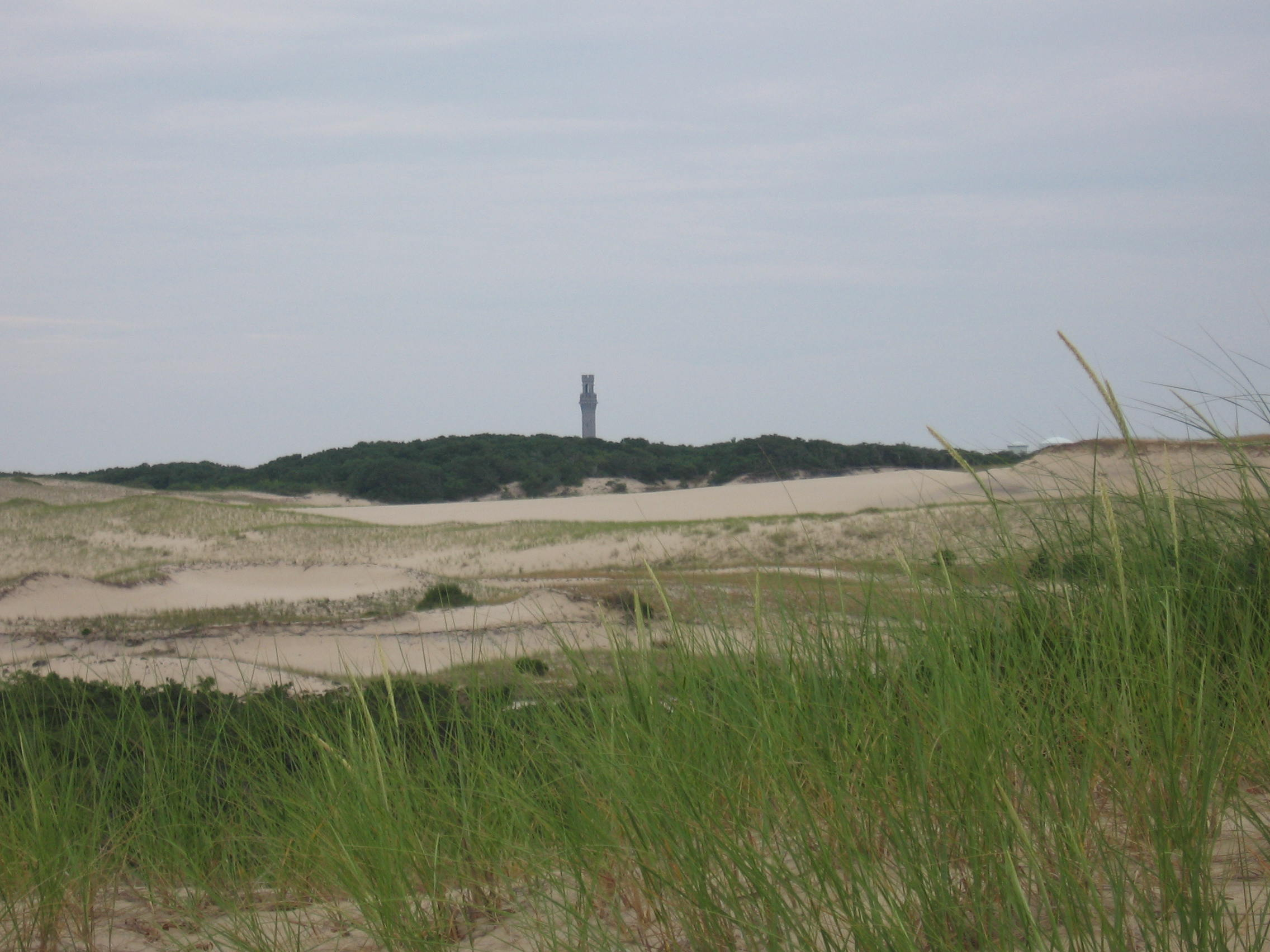
The sand dunes of Provincetown, Massachusetts. The sandy soils did not support agriculture, forcing the former Nauset and people living on offshore islands into greater reliance on sea resources.

The SNEA peoples shared most aspects of culture and related languages, and most distances between peoples were based on local effects of micro-climate, limiting the availability and abundance of certain foods. What differences did exist are only known anecdotally from colonial sources, for example, the Pawtucket of what is now northeastern Massachusetts and coastal New Hampshire, despite speaking a dialect of the Massachusett language, eschewed the eating of bread and preferred eating stewed corn kernels as a side dish, scooping up bits between bites of other food. The Pawtucket also did not thicken their stews with additions of grain and often served various meats slow-cooked and mashed together. The Massachusett, and the Nipmuc that lived just to the west of them, were said to make bread, but unique to these regions, the bread was often enriched with mashed beans or boiled beans in larger proportions or fashioned solely from beans. Although the addition of chestnut meal and fruits to oiled cornbread was common, the Narragansett were said to be in particular very fond of these dishes. As a general rule, the region can be divided into four regions, mainly coastal, inland, upland and insular.

The uplands, particularly the region of rocky hills common in the Nipmuc areas were lightly settled, having the shortest growing seasons in the cultural area and rocky, acidic soils of little fertility. Hunting, fishing and gathering of foods were more important for sources of calories. What this area lacked it made up for in plentiful maple syrup production—since maples did not grow as well along the warmer coastal areas, access to furs and greater abundance of large mammals such as deer, moose—which were uncommon in most other areas of southern New England and bears, highly prized for their fat stores.

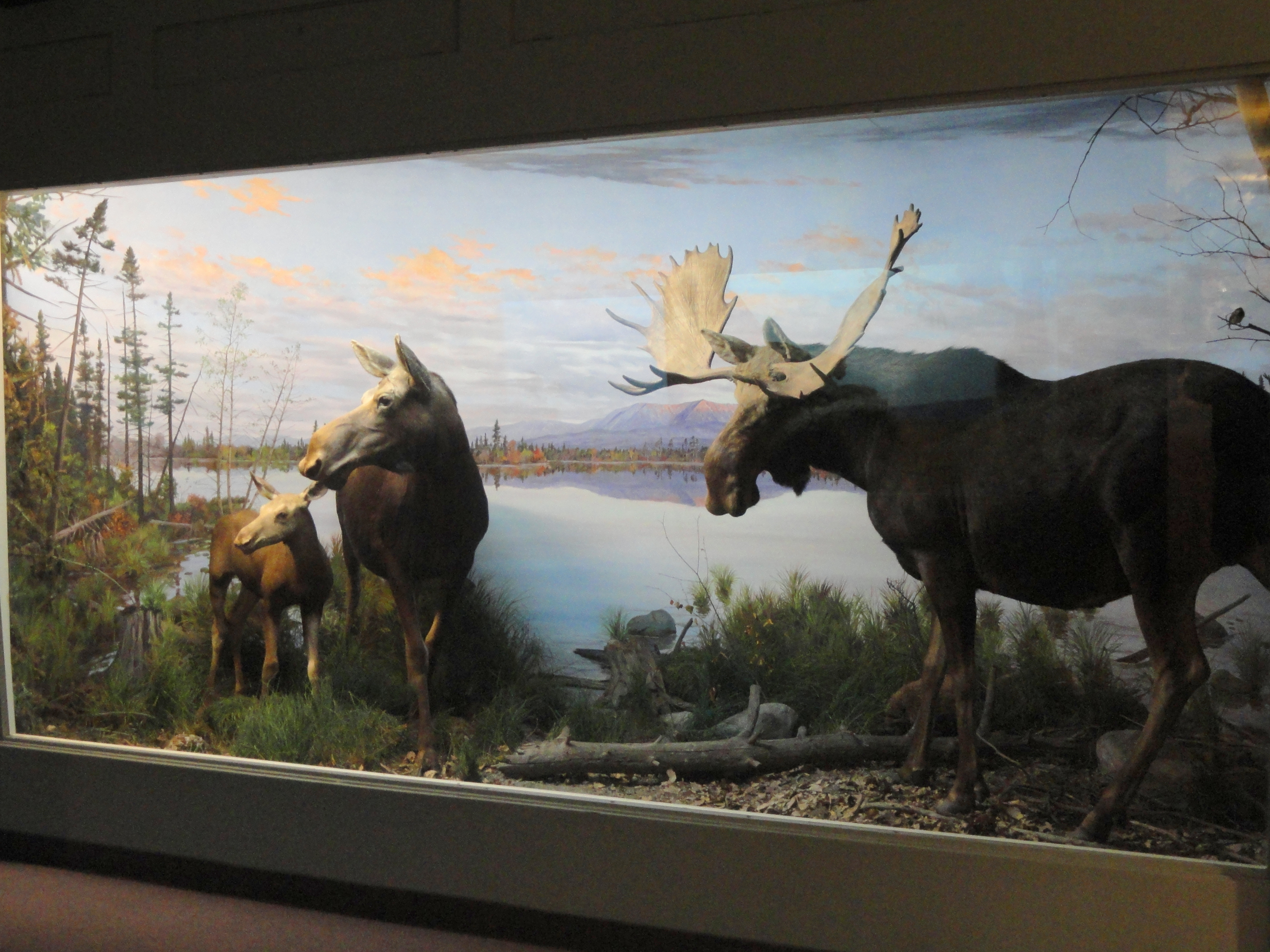
Moose diorama at the Springfield Science Museum. Moose preferred the less disturbed upland swamps, where they were hunted for their large meat stores and pelts, but were rare along the densely populated coastal areas.

The people of the interior generally clustered around large lakes and rivers, which provided access to water, more fertile lands for farming and fish. Rapids and river junctions were important meeting grounds during the spawning runs, and places such as Pawtucket Falls on the Merrimack River and many others featured many tribes gathering to partake of the plentiful food resource. Like the uplands, the interior regions were still less populated than the coastal areas, allowing for easier access to hunting and plentiful lakes, rivers and ponds for fishing or foraging freshwater shellfish.

Coastal areas, due to the larger population density, could not rely on hunting and foraging. The warmer climate did allow for a longer growing season, and the flatter, less rocky and more fertile soils supported more extensive agriculture. The most important resource were the shellfish beds, which were safer and more plentiful than freshwater shellfish, followed by the spawning runs of herring, salmon and other fish, which coastal peoples generally had first pick before the fish reached upstream areas. Deep-sea fishing and taking or large marine mammals was done with large dugout canoes. The warmer climate did mean that the coastal peoples did not produce a lot of maple syrup as the oceanic effects limited their growth and sap production. Although foods were not traditionally enjoyed to the same level of sweetness as the English settlers, coastal peoples made 'Indian jams' and other preparations were often used to flavor foods in lieu of maple syrup. People of insular areas could not rely on hunting or farming, but were marked with a greater use of marine resources.

== Ingredients ==
=== Agriculture ===
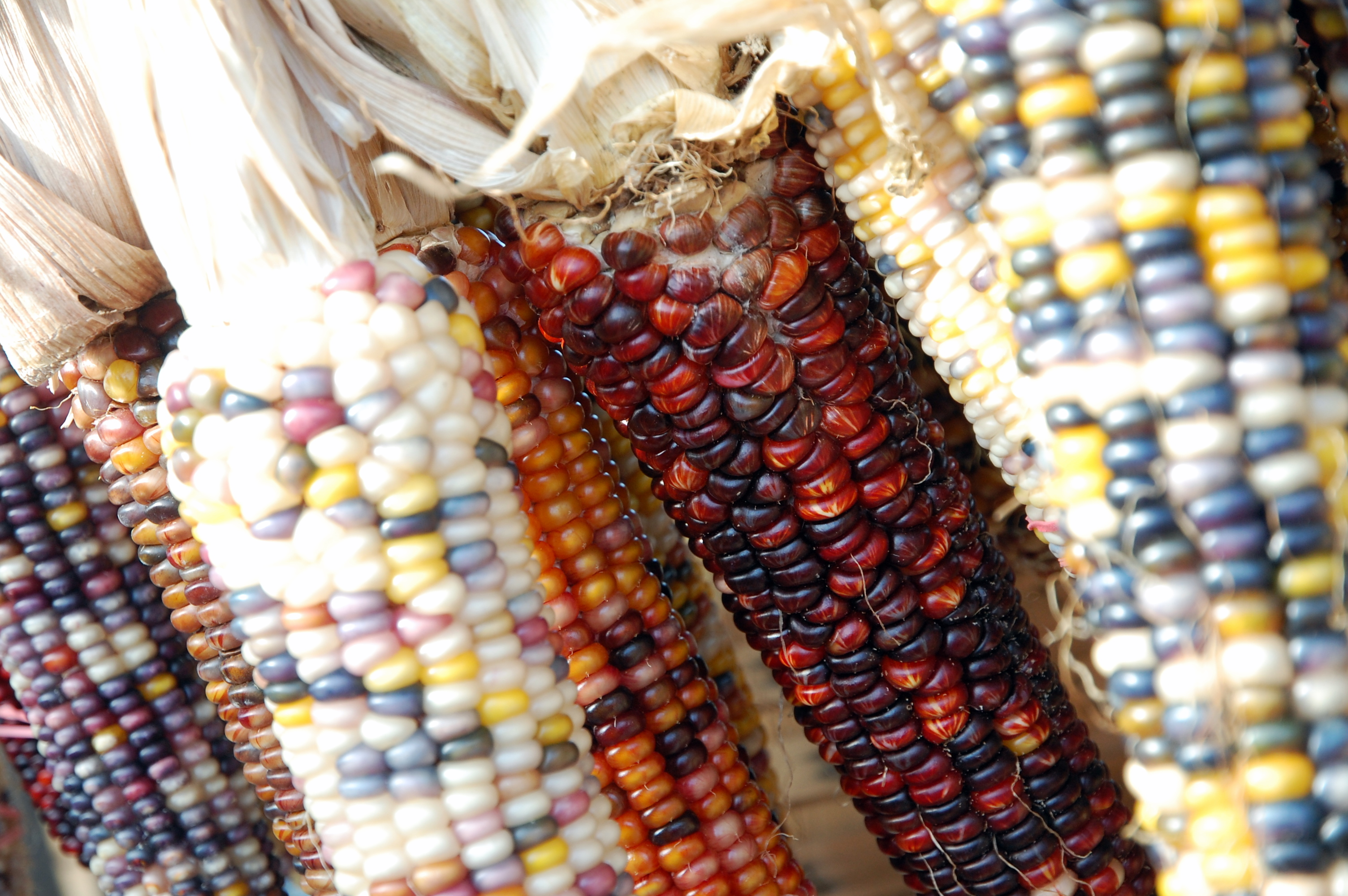
Zea mays, maize or 'corn.' Traditionally variety grown by the Natives shown here.

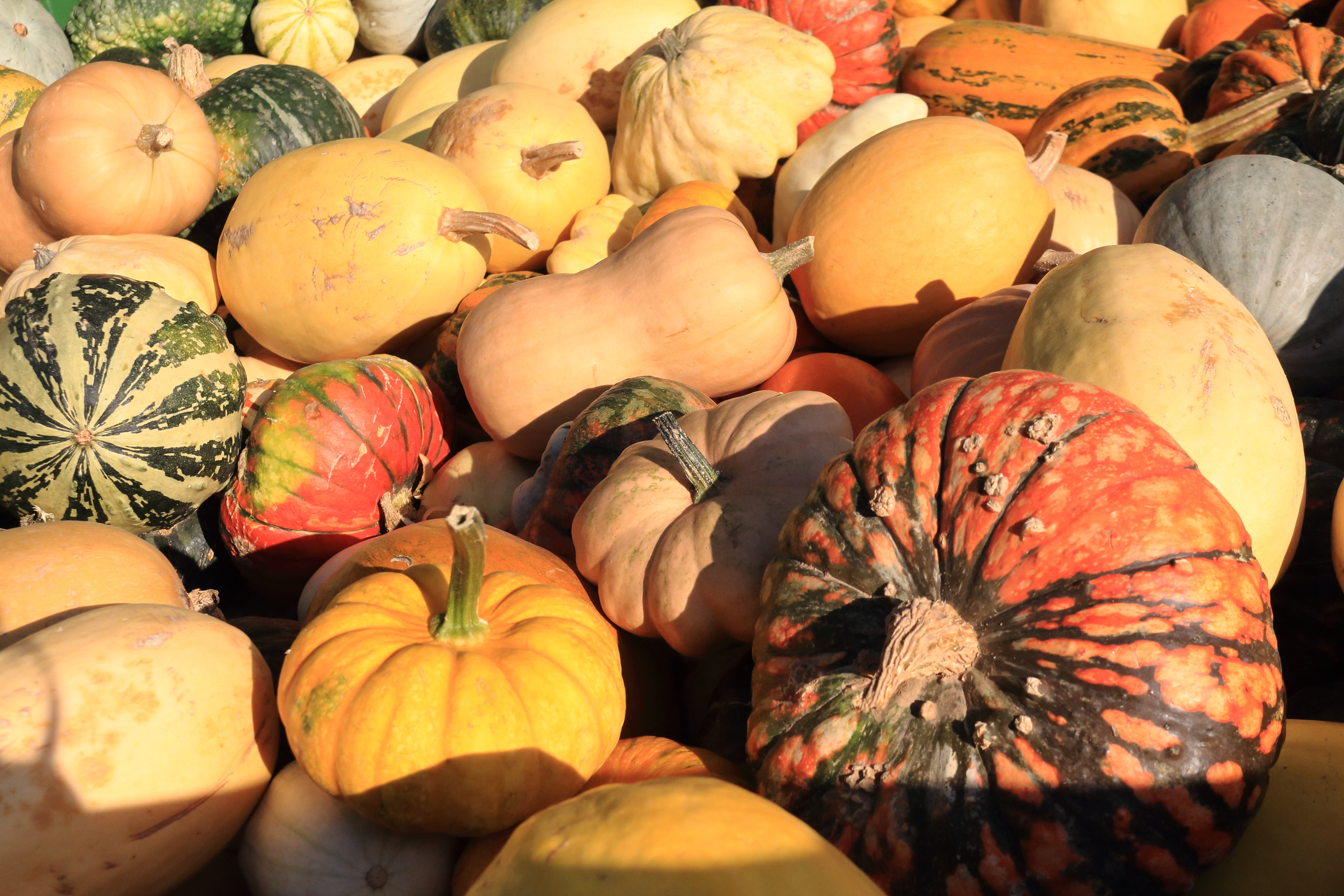
Cucurbita pepo was domesticated into several varieties of squash, pumpkin and melon.

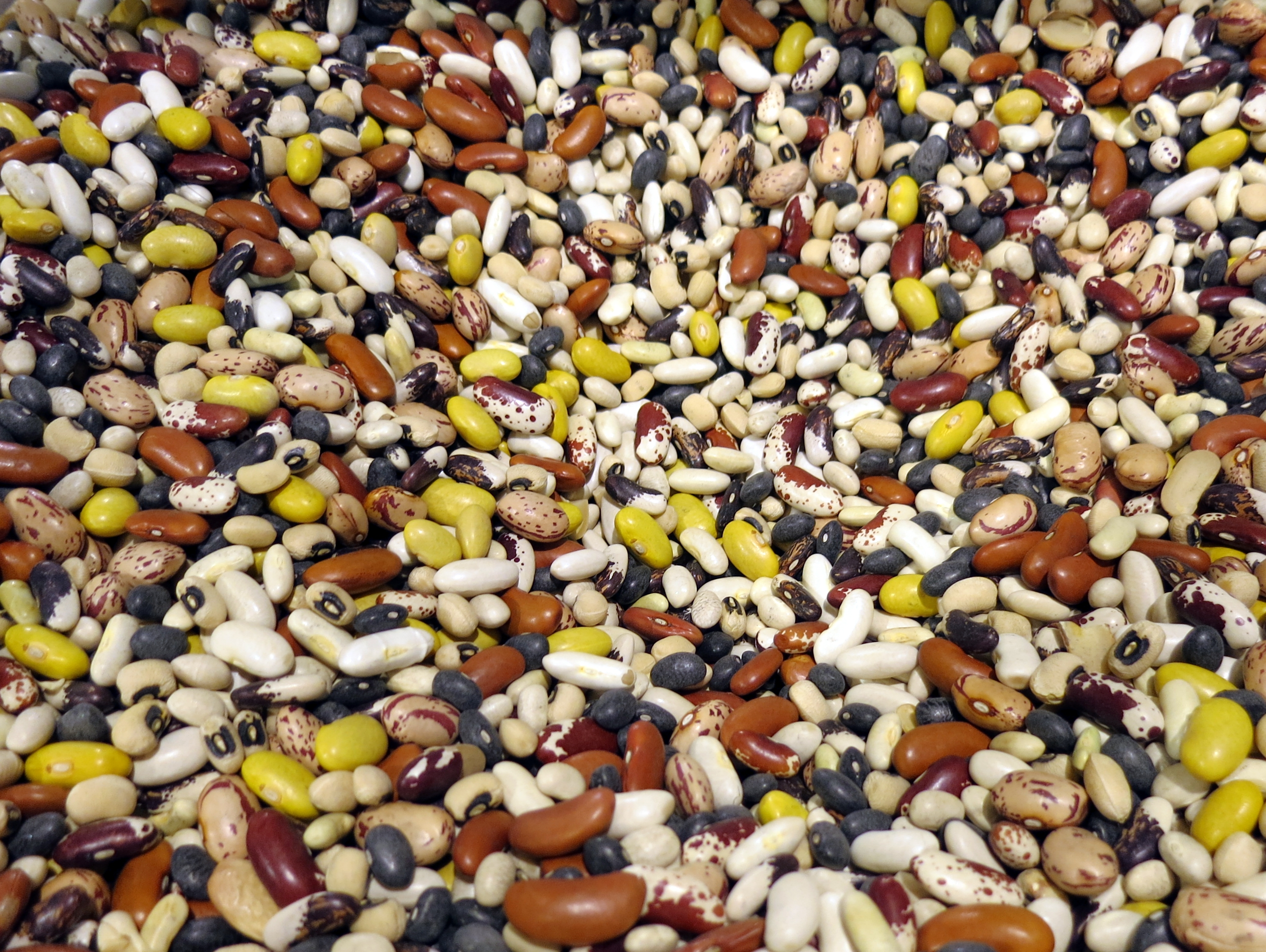
Phaseolus vulgaris and other Phaseolus species were cultivated.

The Three Sisters of maize, beans and various squashes were the cornerstone of a typical meal, and frequently consumed together in dishes. To a lesser extent, Indian women also cultivated sunflowers for their oily seeds and Jerusalem artichokes for their fleshy, starchy tubers. Although evidence is scant, due to accounts of Indian orchards of cherries and walnut trees, it is believed that lands cleared by fire were deliberately planted with various nut and fruit trees to provide food sources for future generations.

=== Gathered plants ===
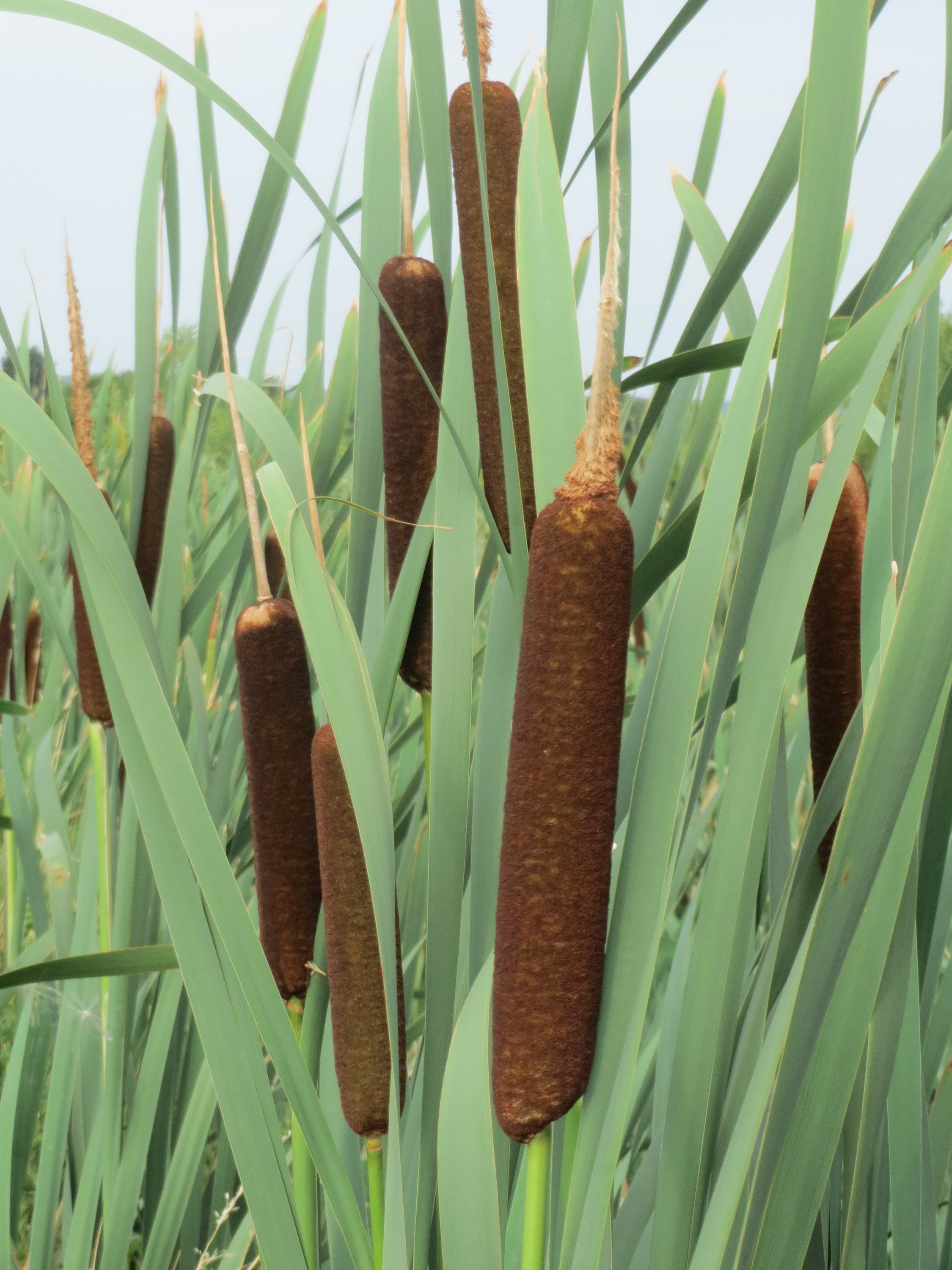
Typha latifolia had a variety of uses.

In traditional Algonquian culture, women were tasked with collecting foods from the wild in addition to their duties in the farmed fields of corn, beans and squash. Several times a year, Native women would venture to collect various plants. Seasonality was a key factor in the availability of foraged foodstuffs. Certain plants were only edible in the early spring, when toxicity was low, or summer, when the berries ripened or fall, when tubers were large and fruit ripened. Foods, divided by how they were used, can be categorized into grain-like seeds, oily nuts and seeds, root vegetables, leafy greens and sweet saps, although several plants could fall in more than one category.

==== Seeds ====
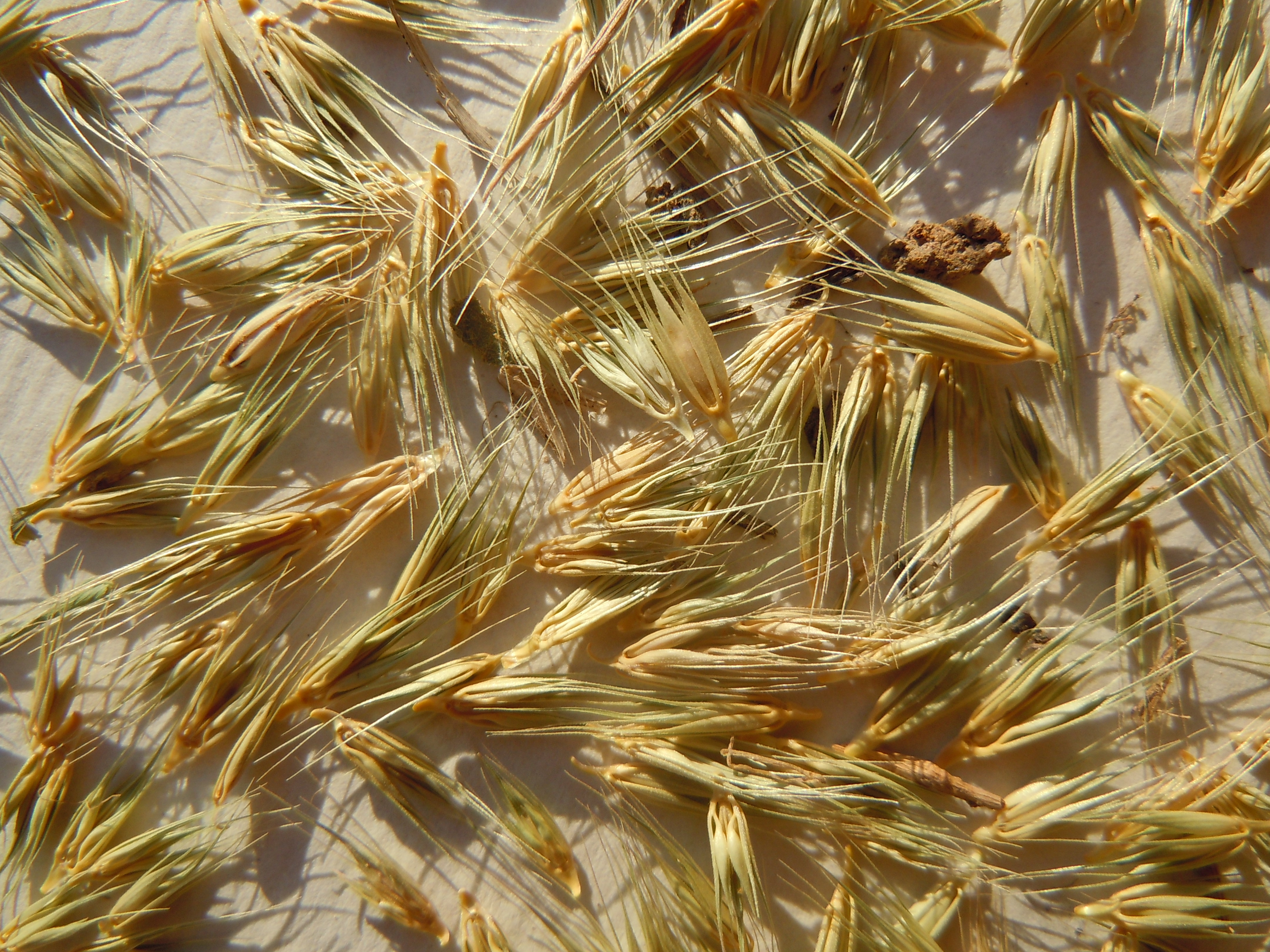
Hordeum pusillum, 'little barley'

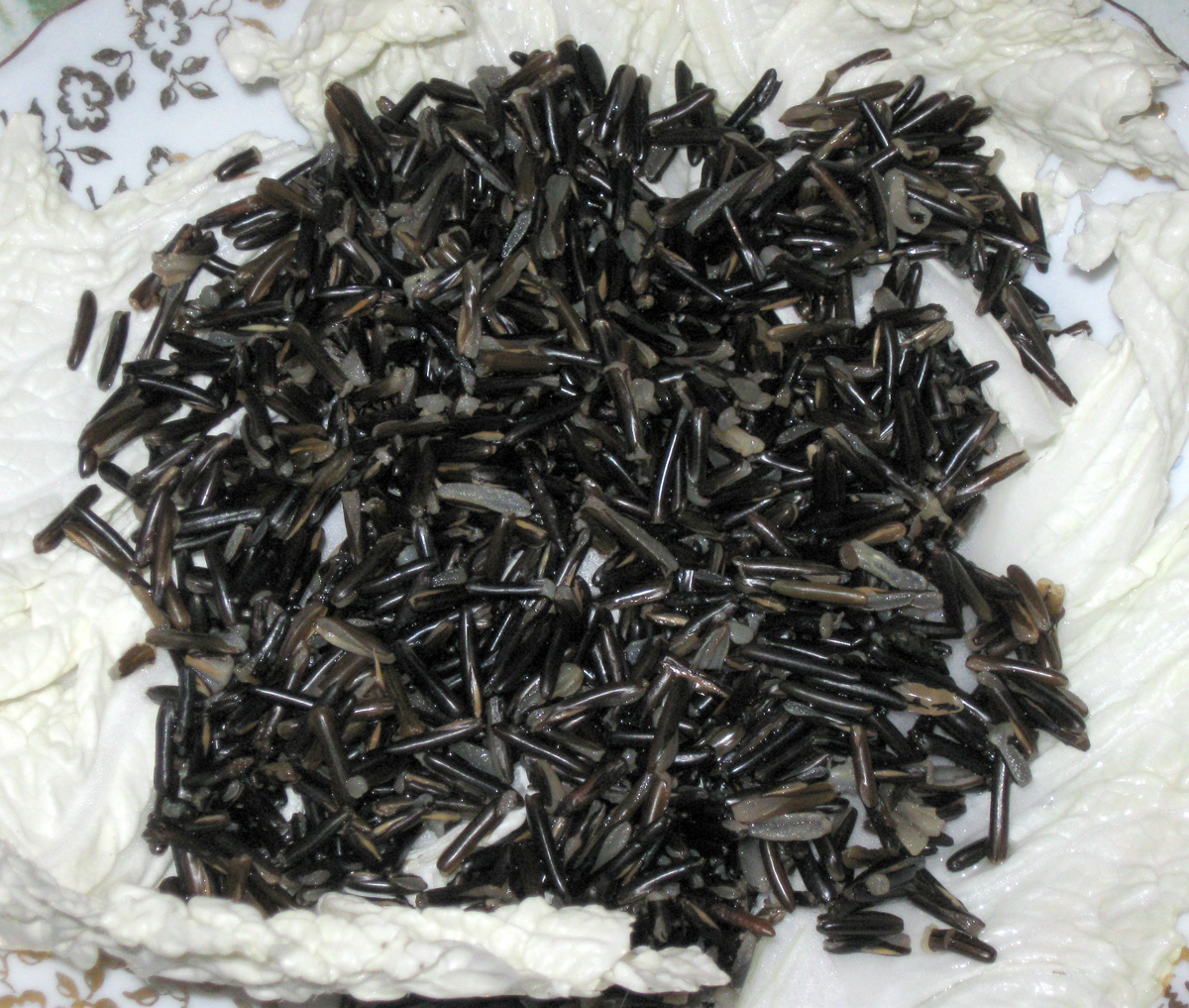
Zizania aquatica, 'wild rice'

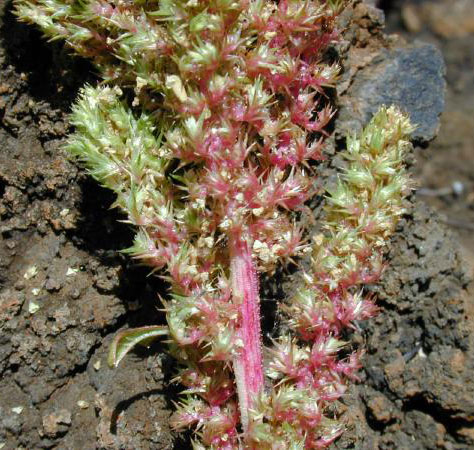
Amaranthus hybridus, 'smooth pigweed'

Several plants were highly valued for their plentiful, grain-like seeds. The seeds were husked and boiled directly in stews when fresh, but often dried to be used to make various types of porridges or ground into flour. The flour was often used as an additive or alone for the purposes of making bread or to thicken soups and stews. Some grains, such as goosefoot and little barley, were once cultivated prior to the introduction of the Three Sisters, but remained important food sources that were still collected from the wild. Beechnuts, although technically the nut produced from beech trees, was so small and produced little oil was generally used the same way as grain seeds. The seeds of the amaranth and chenopod plants were similar to the modern use of quinoa, to which they are closely related.

- Amaranthus blitoides, 'prostrate pigweed,' leaves also edible as a vegetable.
- Amaranthus hybridus, 'smooth pigweed,' leaves also edible as a vegetable.
- Celtis occidentalis, 'hackberry'
- Chenopodium berlandieri, 'goosefoot' (formerly cultivated)
- Comptonia peregrina, 'sweetfern'
- Fagus grandifolia, 'beechnut' or schauwemin (shôweemun) /ʃãwiːmən/.
- Hordeum jubatum, 'foxtail barley'
- Hordeum pusillum, 'little barley' (formerly cultivated)
- Nuphar variegata, 'yellow pond-lily'
- Phalaris caroliniana, 'maygrass' (formerly cultivated)
- Zizania aquatica, 'wild rice' or manꝏmin (man8mun) /manuːmən/

==== Oily nuts and seeds ====
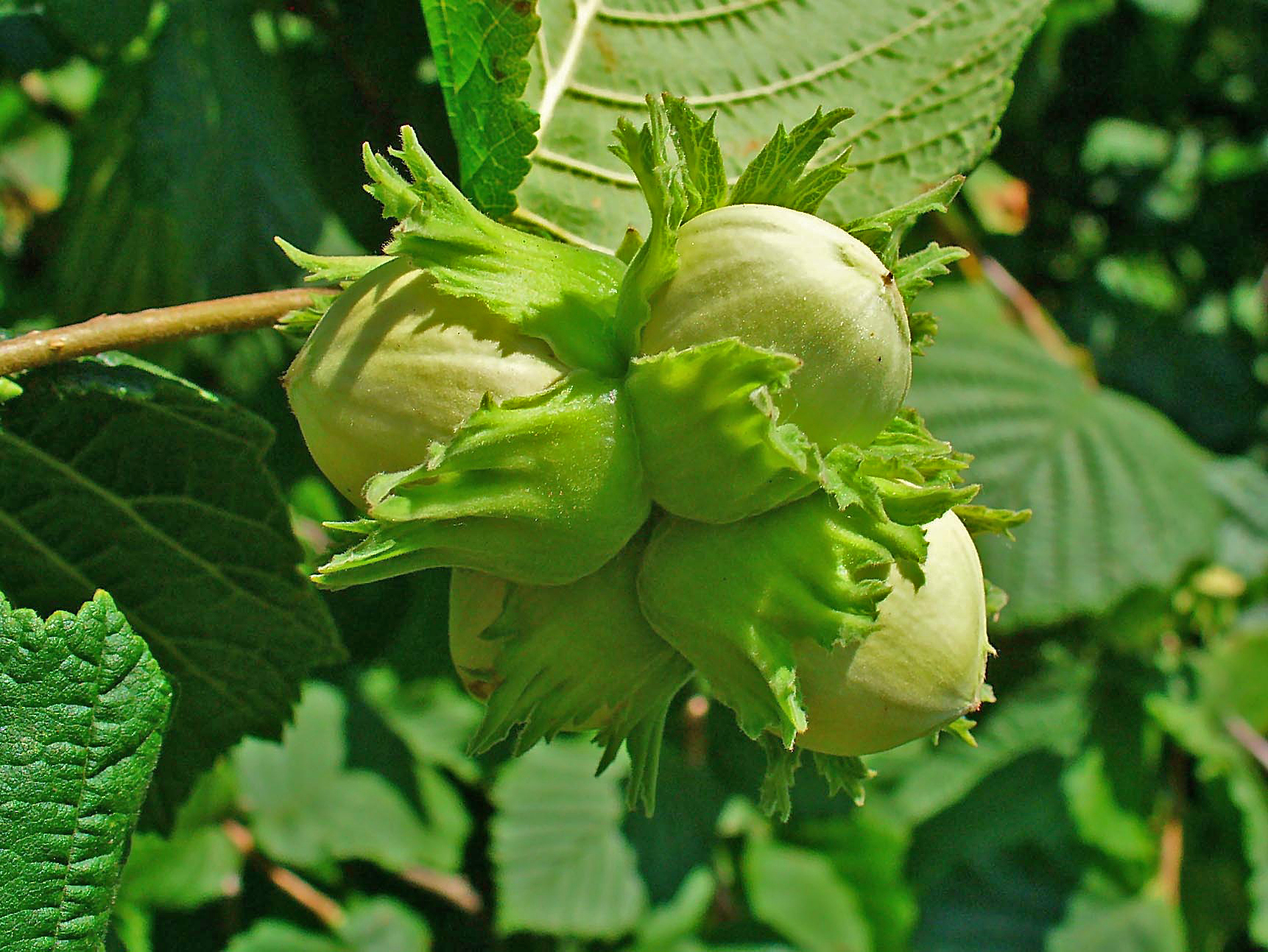
Hazelnut

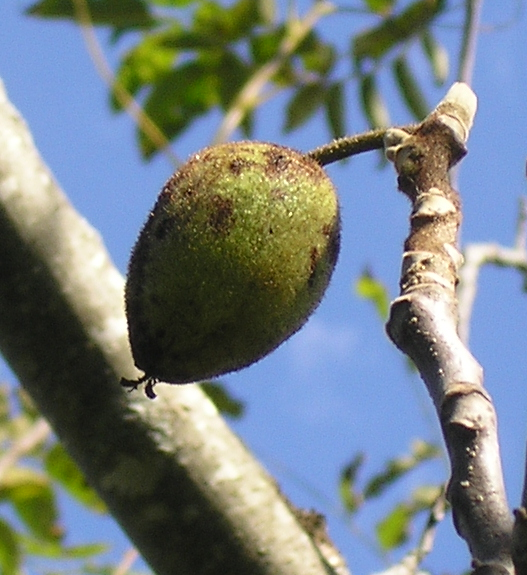
Butternut

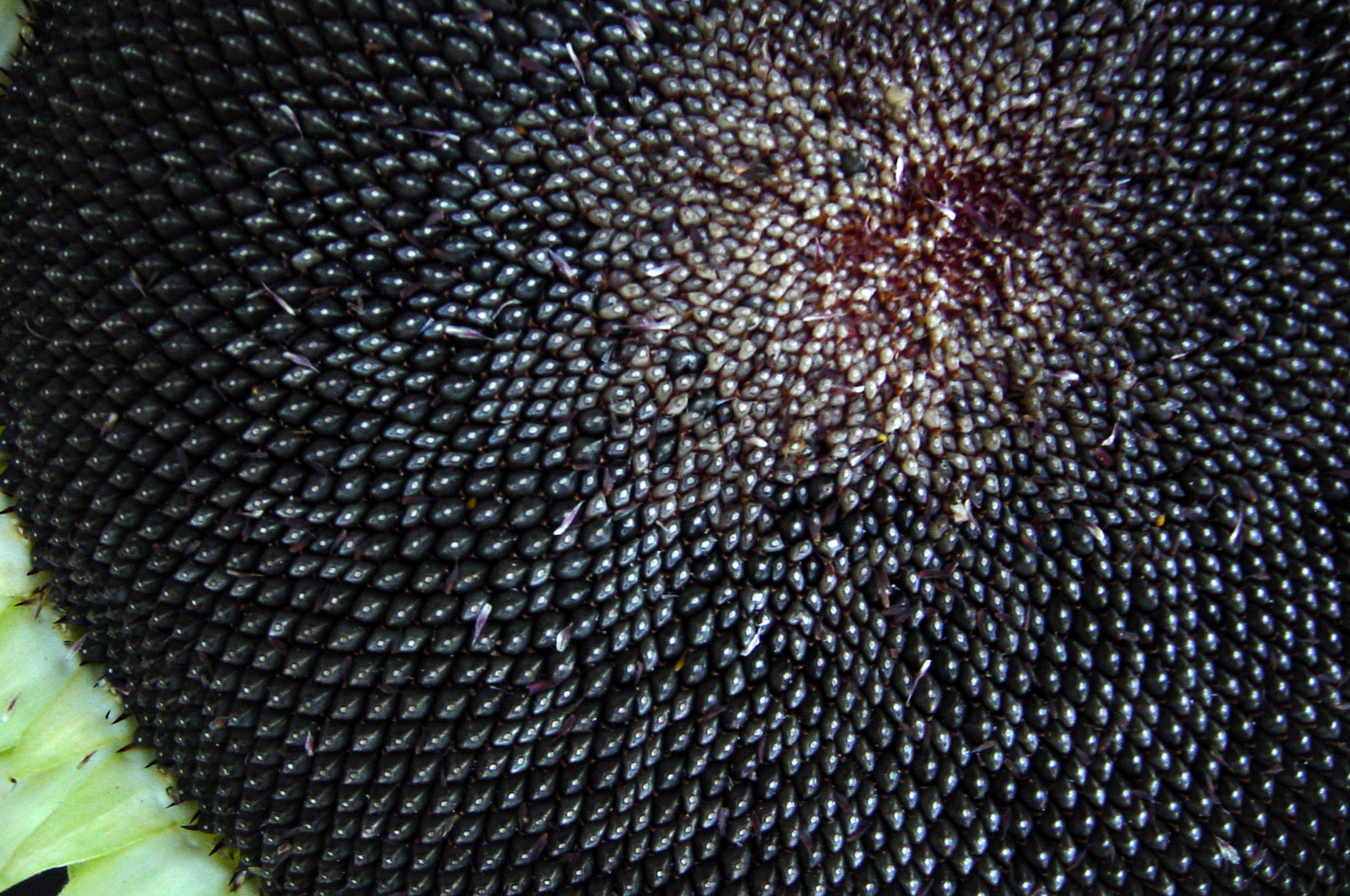
Sunflower seed

Nuts and oily seeds were shelled, ground and boiled to separate the oils which was stored to make soups and stews heartier in the winter, to baste roasting meats, as a preservative or to make lotions and salves for various medicinal and cosmetic uses. The protein-rich leftover meal was added to breads or thickened soups.

- Carya glabra, 'pignut' (hickorynut)
- Carya laciniosa, 'kingnut' (hickorynut) or mꝏsimin (m8sumun) /muːsəmən/
- Castanea dentata, 'chestnut' or wapim[in] (wôpumun) /wãpəmən/
- Corylus americana, 'common hazelnut'
- Helianthus annuus, 'sunflower' (generally cultivated)
- Juglans cinerea, 'butternut'
- Juglans nigra, 'black walnut' or ptuckquem[in] (putuqumun) /pətəkʷəmən/
- Quercus sp., 'oaknut'/'acorn' or anáuchemin (anôhcheemun)

==== Root vegetables ====
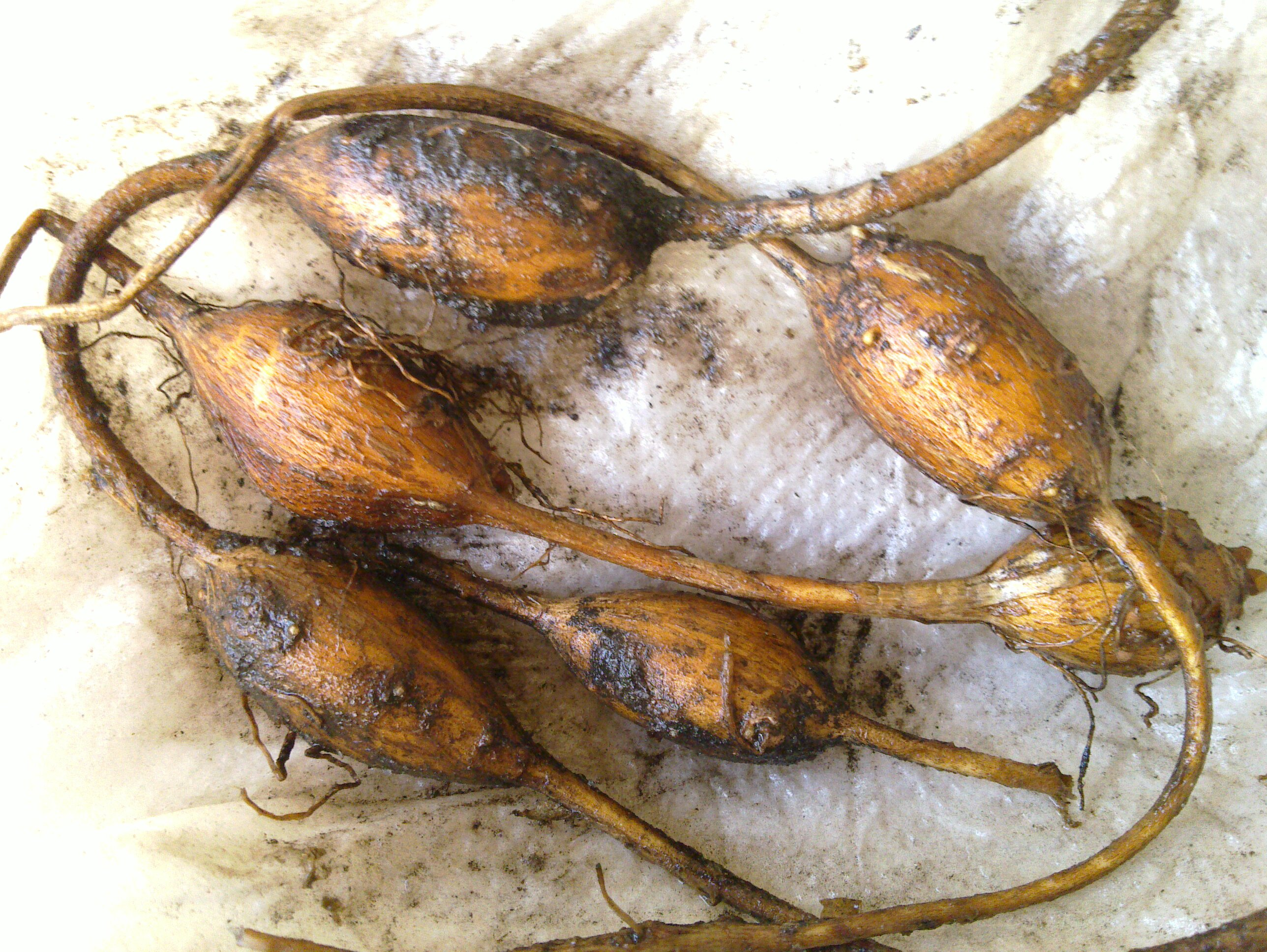
Apios americana or 'groundnut' tubers.

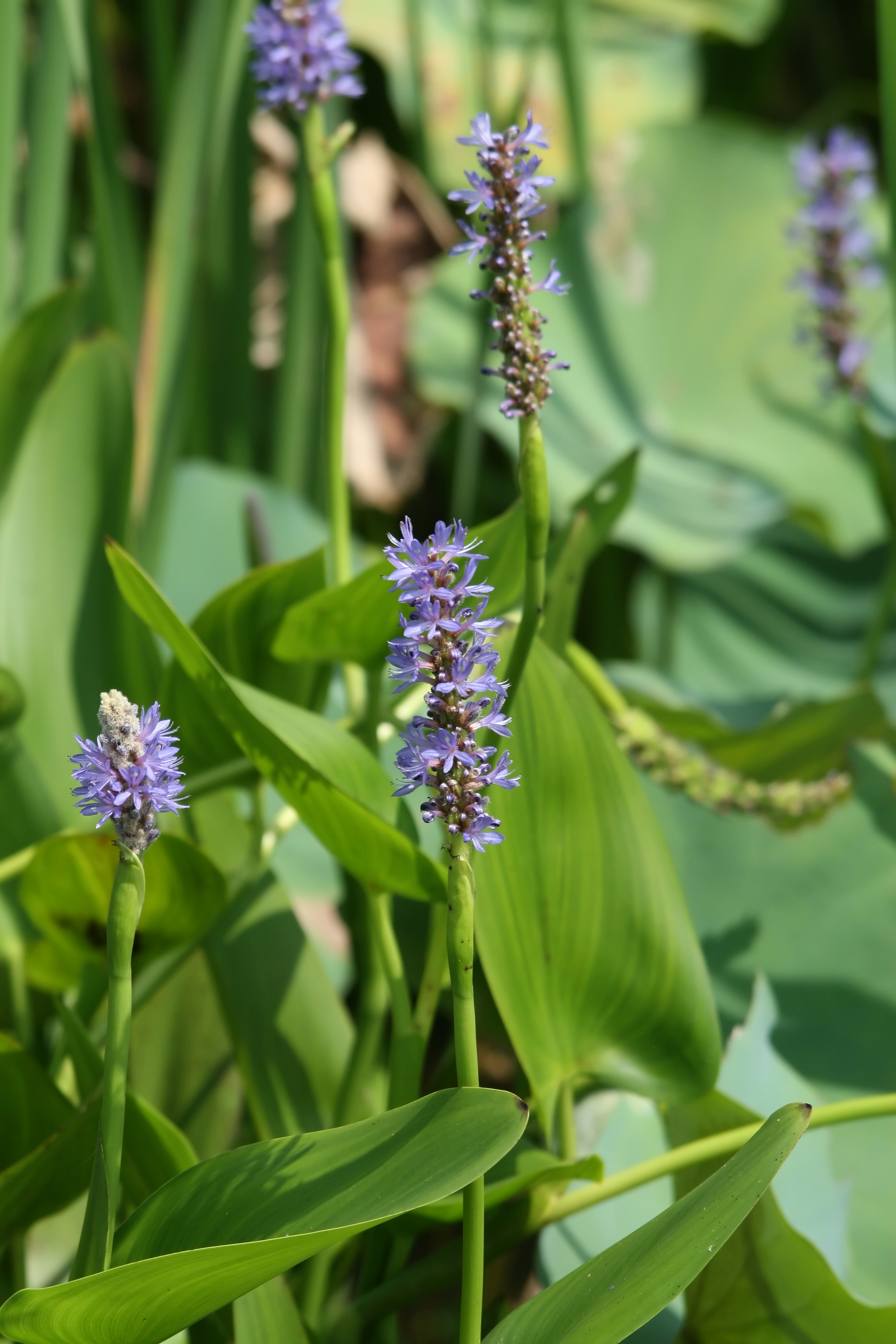
Sagittaria latifolia or 'duck potato.'

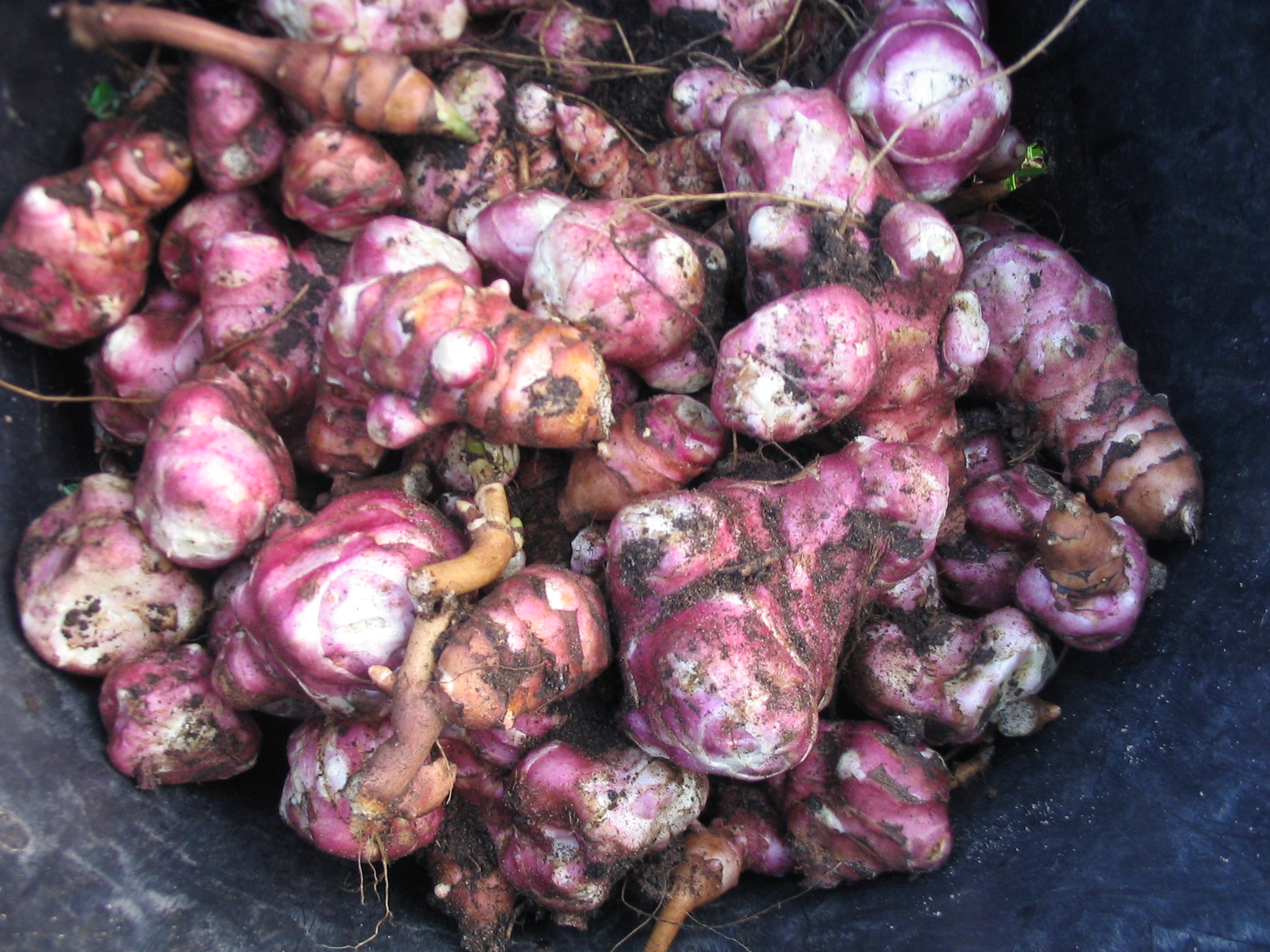
Helianthus tuberosus or 'Jerusalem artichoke'

Starchy tubers, rhizomes, bulbs, and underground stems were prized foods for the energy they provided, and if they were starchy enough, could be ground into a flour to make breads, but were best enjoyed boiled in stews or roasted in the ashes. In many ways, root vegetables were eaten and enjoyed much as potatoes are in New England cuisine.

- Allium canadense, 'Canada onion,' eaten for its tubers but also used as a flavoring agent.
- Amphicarpaea bracteata, 'ground bean'
- Apios americana, 'groundnut'
- Argentina egedei, 'silverweed'
- Lilium canadense, 'Canada lily'
- Lilium superbum, 'Turk's cap lily'
- Medeola virginiana, 'Indian cucumber'
- Oenothera biennis, 'evening primrose'
- Nymphaea odorata, 'white water-lily'
- Sagittaria latifolia, 'duck potato'
- Typha latifolia, 'cattail' or wekunasq (weekunashq) /wiːkunaʃk/

==== Greens ====
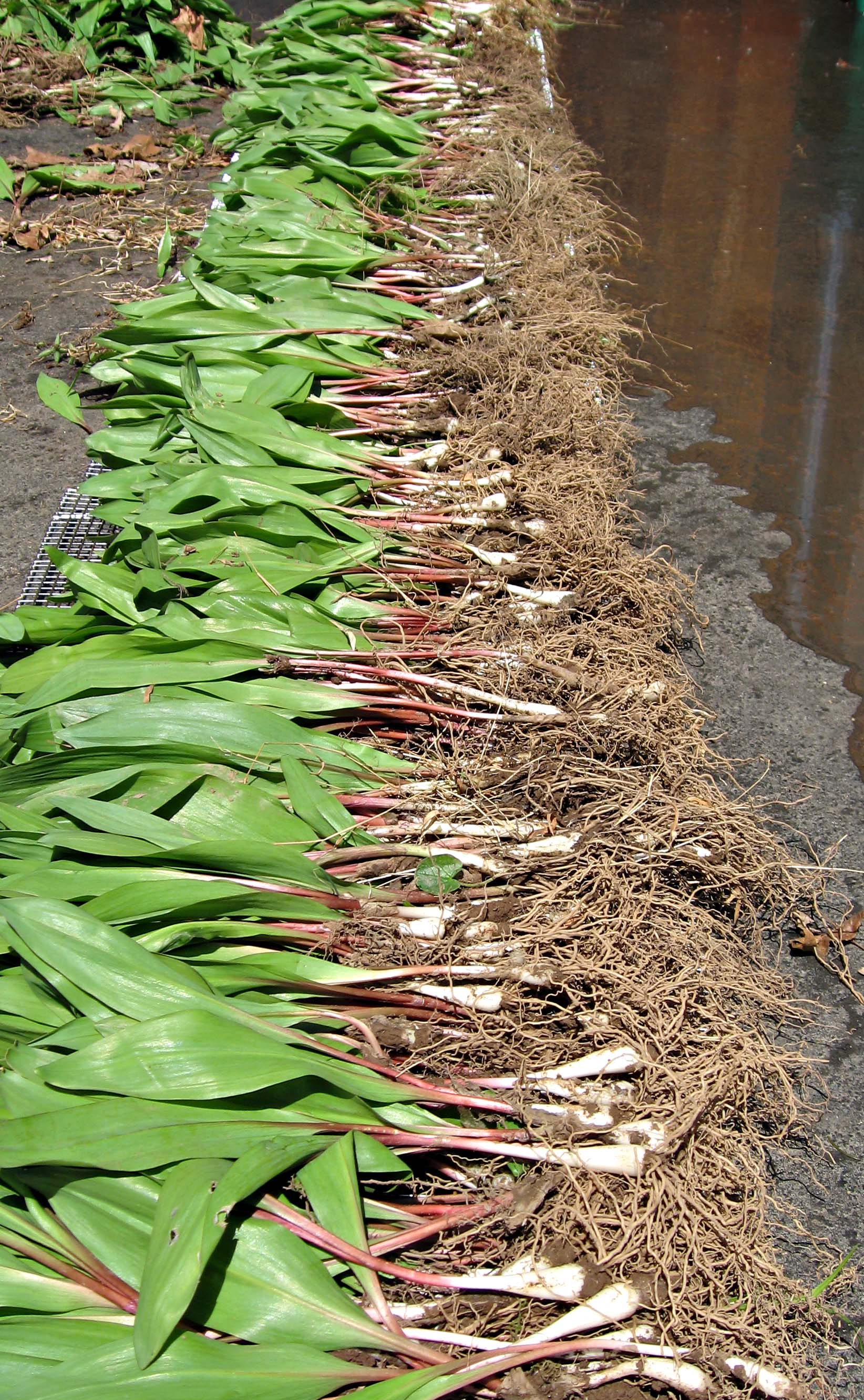
Allium tricoccum or 'ramp' or 'wood leek.'

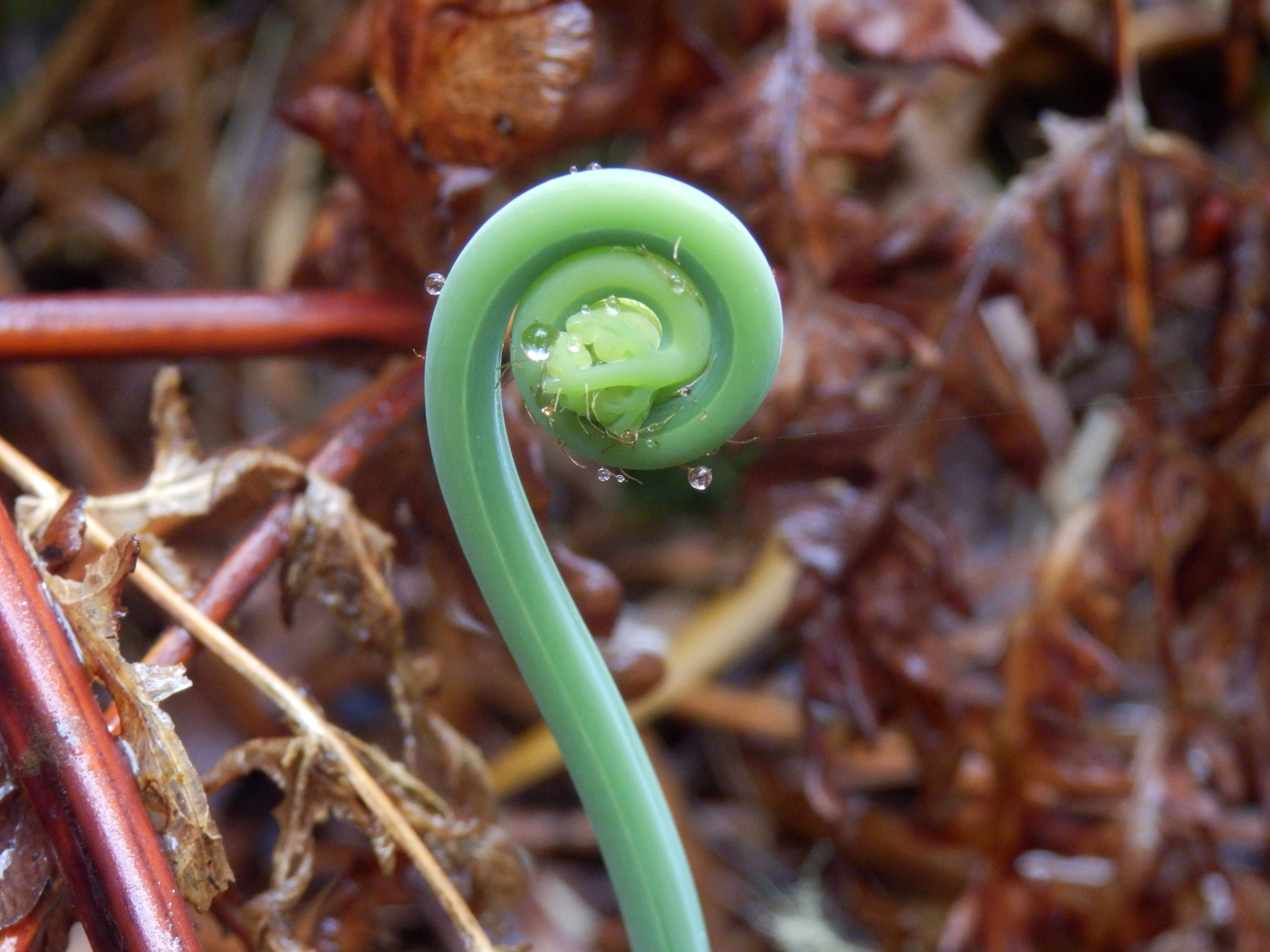
'Fiddlehead' stage of fern

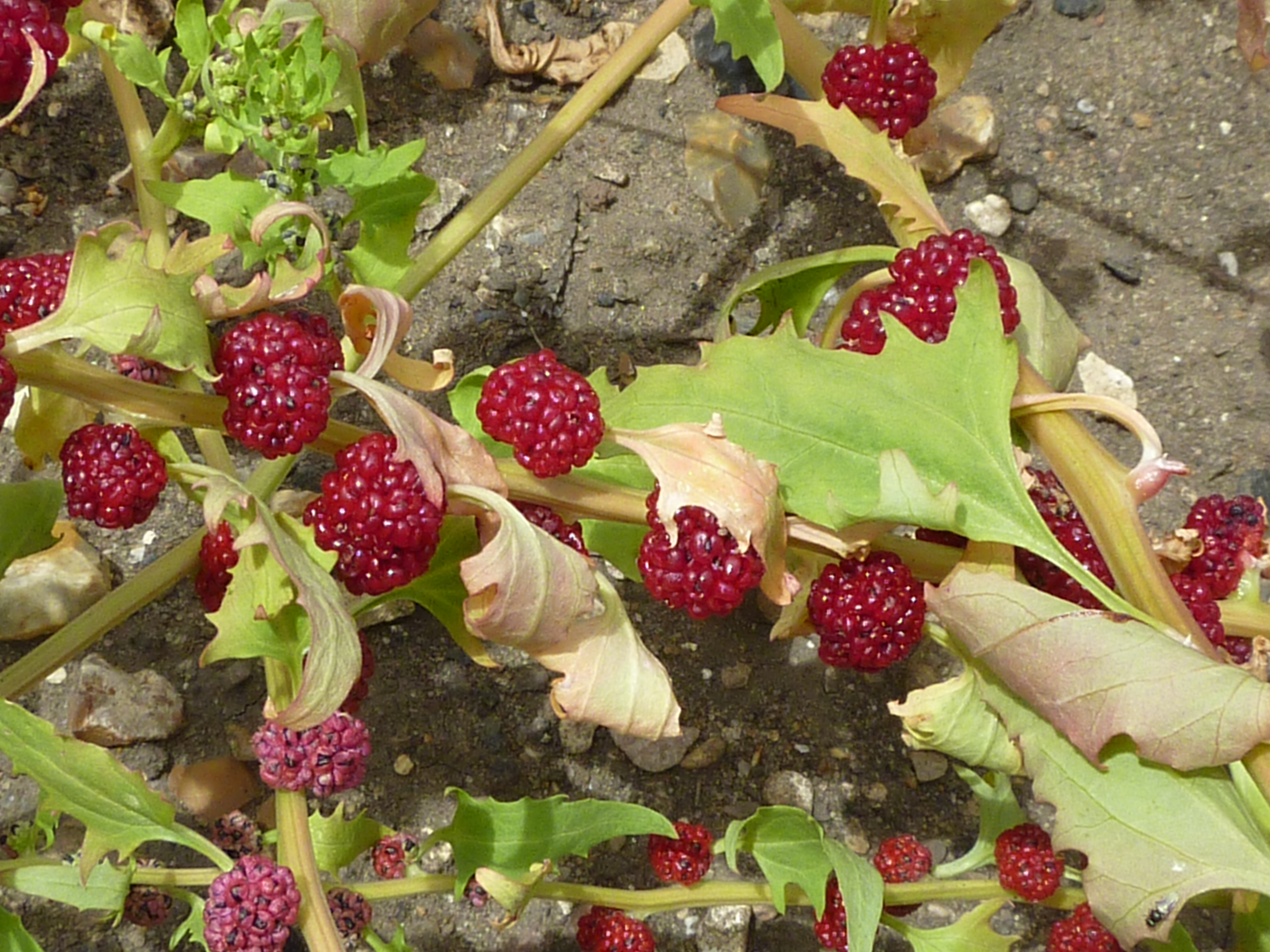
Chenopodium capitatum or 'strawberry goosefoot'

Leaves, shoots, tendrils and buds were generally gathered in spring, when the first growth was not fibrous or at stages when the plant was least toxic and could be made edible with preparation. Although not a plant, as a coastal people, seaweed could be dried or boiled in soups for flavoring.

- Allium tricoccum, 'ramp,' valued as a vegetable but also for the garlic-like flavor it imparted in foods.
- Amaranthus sp., generally used for seeds, but leaves are edible at all stages.
- Atriplex cristata, 'orache'
- Asclepias sp., toxic, but first growth is edible if cooked thoroughly and before sap runs.
- Caltha palustris, 'marsh marigold,' leaves edible before flowering but only after extensive boiling.
- Chenopodium sp., chenopods, used for seeds but leaves are edible at all stages.
- Clintonia borealis, 'yellow bead-lily', young leaves are edible.
- Fiddlehead-stage of various ferns, edible after boiling and changes of water.
- Ligusticum scothicum, 'Scots lovage,' young leaves and stems are edible.
- Nyphaea odorata, 'water-lily,' young stems and leaves, otherwise too fibrous.
- Palmaria palmata, 'red dulce,' edible type of red algae.
- Phytolacca americana, 'pokeweed' or 'skokeweed,' very poisonous. Only very young leaves are edible after boiling and extensive changes of water.
- Rubus idaeus, 'red raspberry,' leaves edible after drying.
- Symplocarpus foetidus, 'skunk cabbage,' young, unfurled leaves edible after drying and boiling.
- Tilia americana, basswood, first spring leaves and flowers are edible.
- Typha latifolia, 'cattail,' young shoots and inner pith of stems, otherwise too fibrous.
- Ulva compressa, 'sea lettuce,' edible type of green algae.

==== Fruits and berries ====
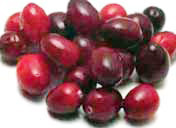
Vaccinium macrocarpon or 'cranberry'

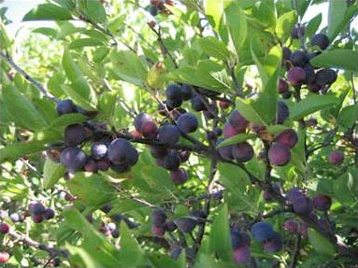
Prunus maritima or 'sea plum'

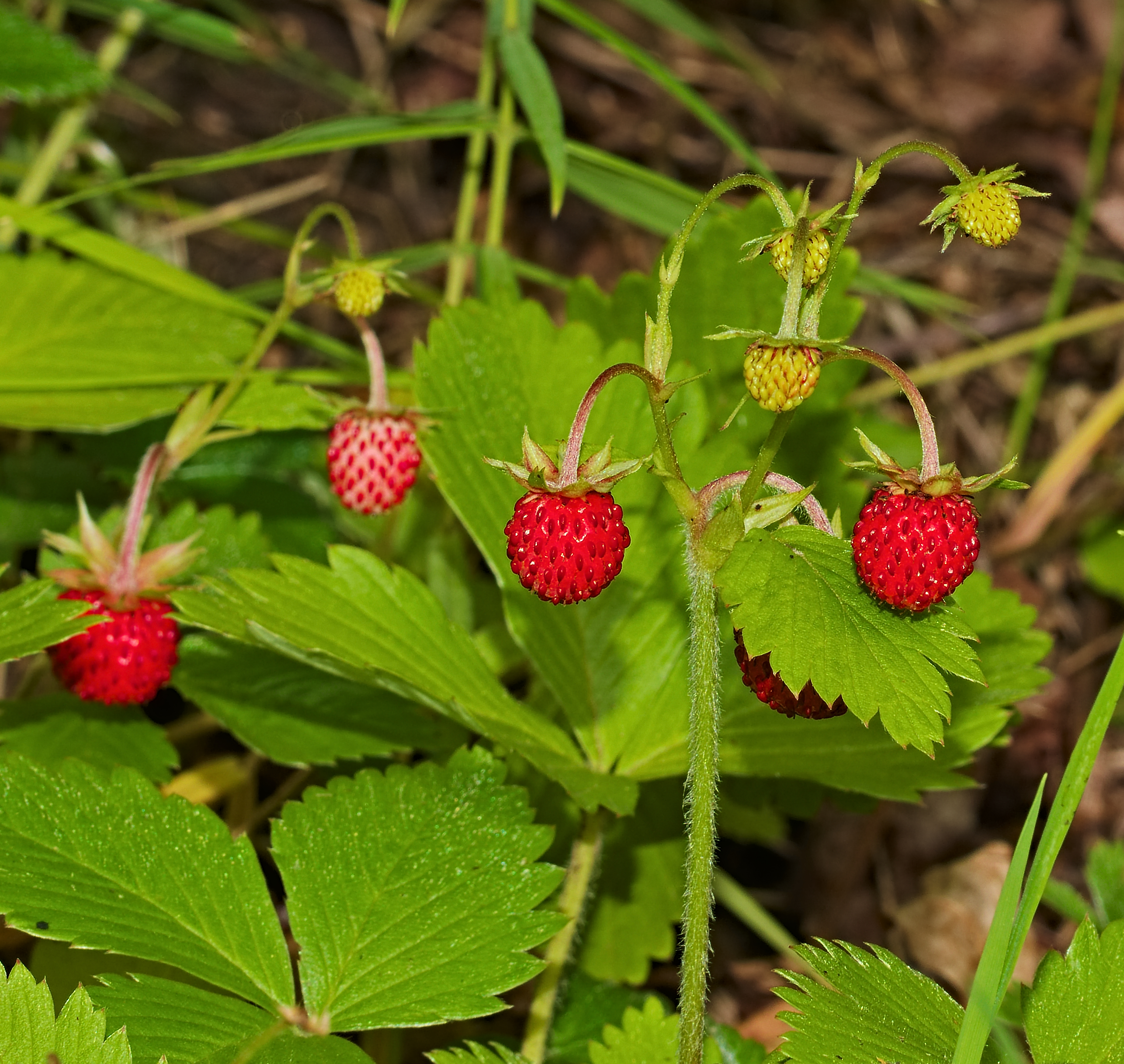
Fragraria vesca or 'woodland strawberry'

Sweet fruits of all kind ripened in the summer and fall. They were eaten fresh, baked into breads to sweeten them for special occasions or were dried and used to flavor water for drinking. The seeds and pits of many fruit are also edible and were ground into flour.

- Amelanchier sp., 'serviceberry'
- Fragaria sp., 'strawberry' or wutáhimun (wutâheemun) /wətaːhiːmən/
- Gaylussacia baccata, 'black huckleberry'
- Morus rubra, 'red mulberry'
- Prunus americana, 'wild plum'
- Prunus maritima, 'sea plum'
- Prunus serotina, 'wild cherry' or qussuckqumin (qusuqumun) /kʷəsəkʷəmən/
- Rubus flagellaris, 'dewberry'
- Rubus occidentalis, 'black raspberry'
- Rubus odoratus, 'flowering raspberry'
- Vaccinium sp. sect. Cyanococcus, 'blueberry'
- Vaccinium sp. sect. Oxycoccus, 'cranberry' or sasemin (saseemun) /sasiːmən/
- Viburnum lentago, 'nannyberry'
- Viburnum nudum, 'wild raisin'
- Vitis sp., 'wild grape' or wenóm[en] (ween8mun) /wiːnuːmən/

==== Saps and syrups ====
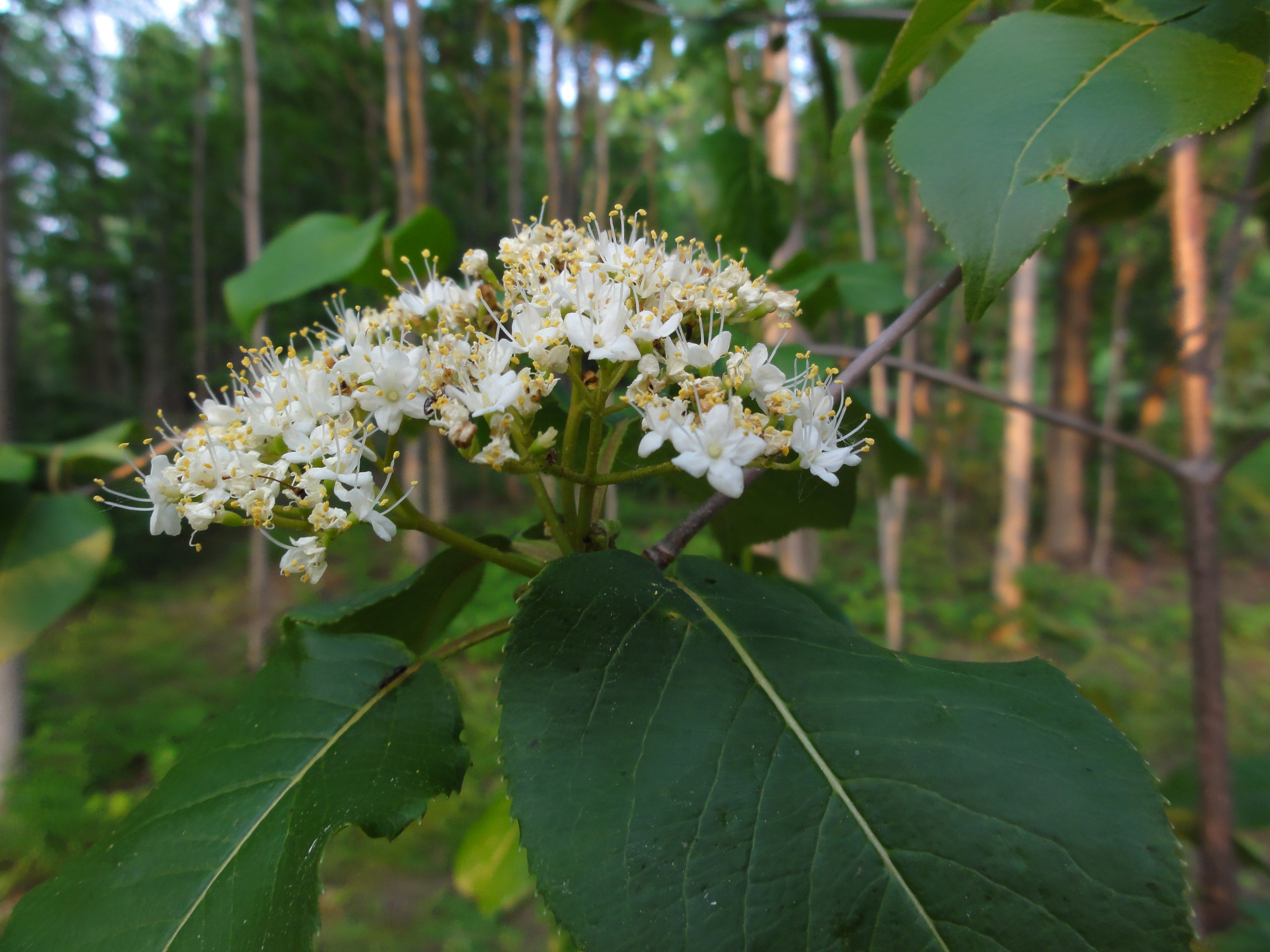
Viburnum lentago or 'nannyberry' blossoms.

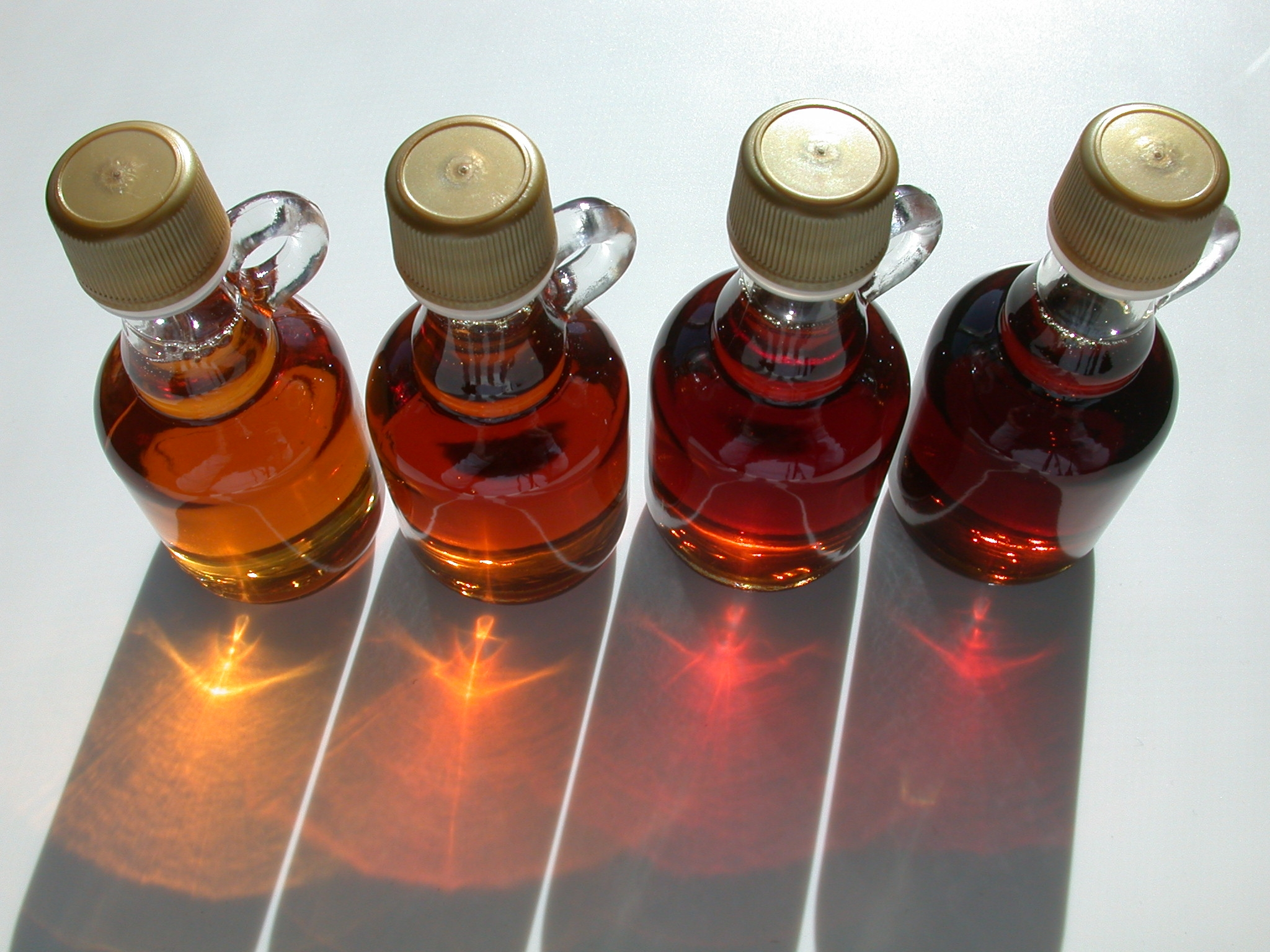
Maple syrup

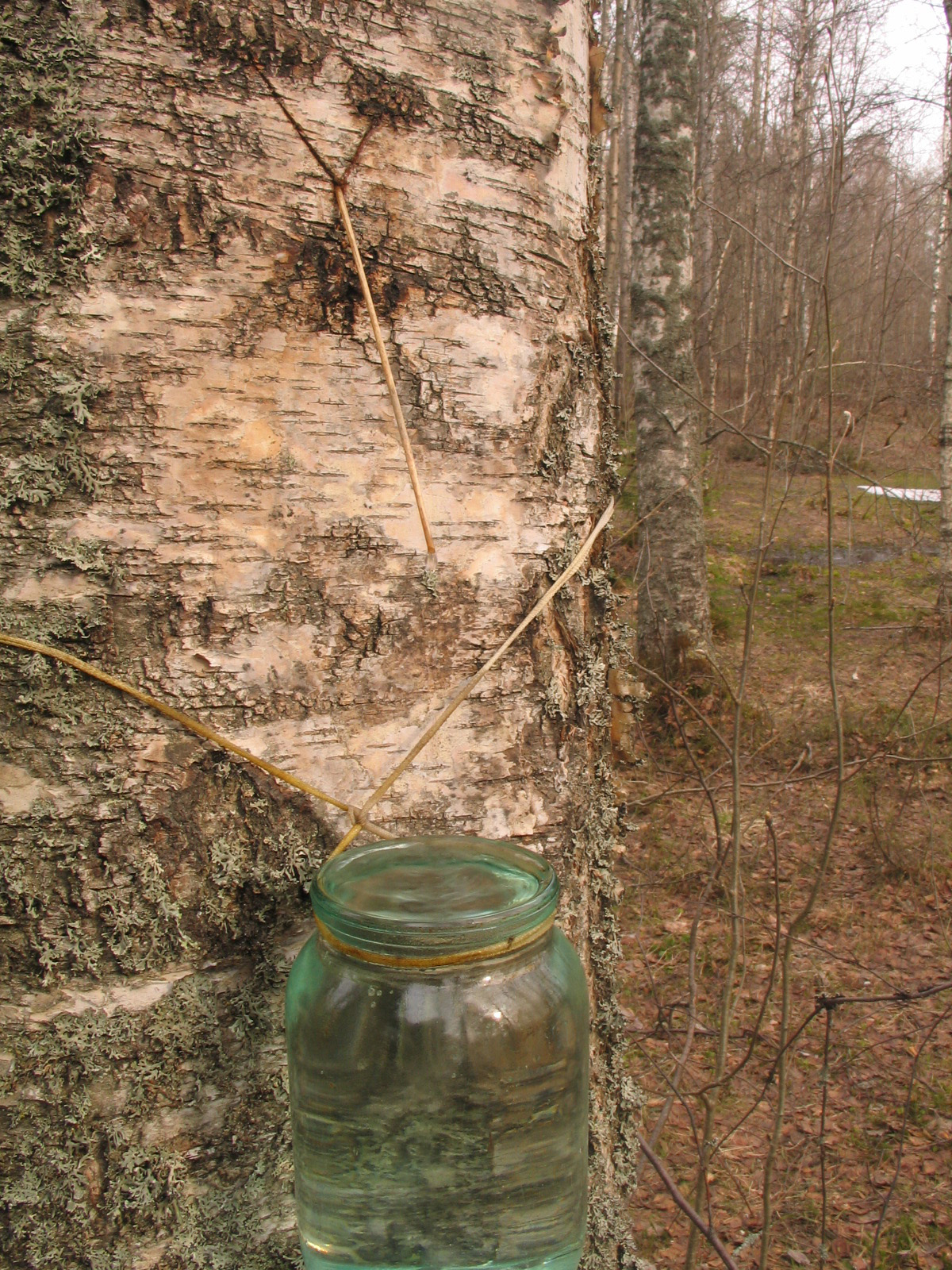
Birch sap collection

The Algonquian peoples taught the European settlers how to tap maple trees for sap to make syrup and maple sugar candy. Areas directly along the coast, however, do not support productive numbers of the species that are tapped for sap. In these areas, substitutes such as the use of elderflower, nannyberries, sweetflag and birches were used instead much like maple syrup was used in northern and interior regions.

- Acer sp., 'maple' and 'box elder'
- Acorus americanus, 'American sweetflag'
- Betula alleghaniensis, 'yellow birch'
- Betula lenta, 'black birch'
- Tilia americana, 'elderflower' ('basswood tree')
- Viburnum sp., flowers in spring and later fruit could be boiled into syrup. Note that only some Viburnum species are edible, many are quite toxic.

=== Hunted animals ===
In Algonquian tradition, men were the hunters and were also responsible for fashioning bow and arrows, spears, spear points, hooks and traps used for capturing game. The most prized animal was the white-tailed deer, with sections of forest cleared by 'fire-stick farming' to increase deer numbers by promoting grassy meadows and grassy understories where deer fed. Men also gathered in large numbers during the annual deer hunt, where groups of men howled and beat drums to flush the deer out of the woods or areas they congregated into an ambush of awaiting hunters ready with their bows drawn. Large mammals were valued for their meat, furs, skins that could be turned into leather for clothing and shoes, bones that could be fashioned into pins, needles, beads and hooks and sinews that were chewed into bowstrings and strong thread. Bears, with their large fat stores, were prized for the oils and greases that could be rendered from the flesh. All that was edible was eaten, sometimes however, only during crop failure and other moments of food insecurity.

==== Mammals ====
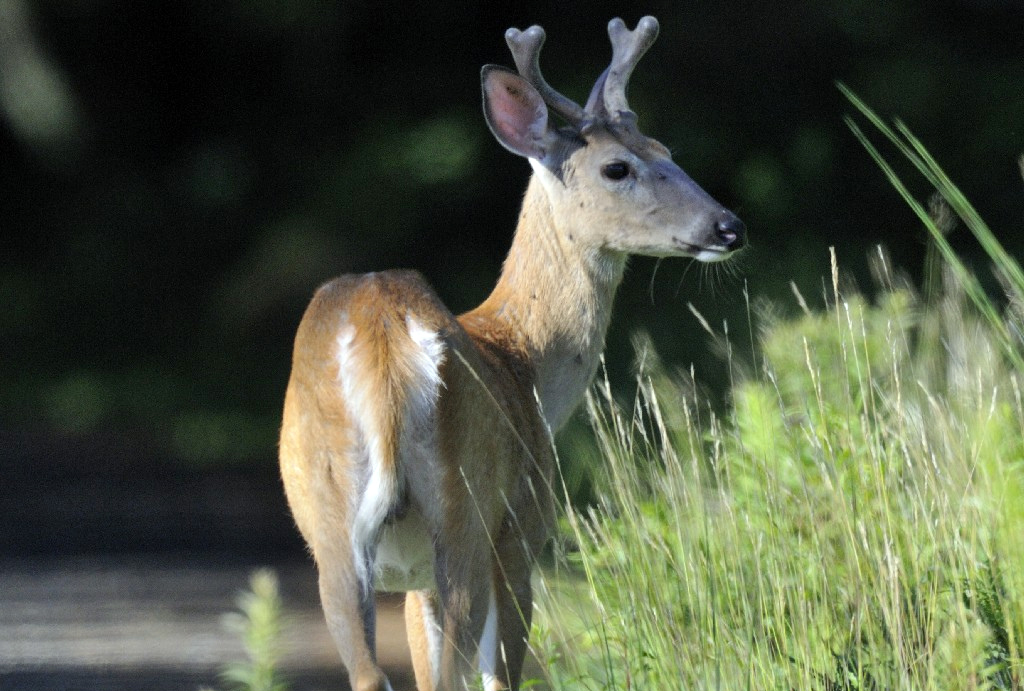
Odocoileus virginianus, 'white-tailed deer'

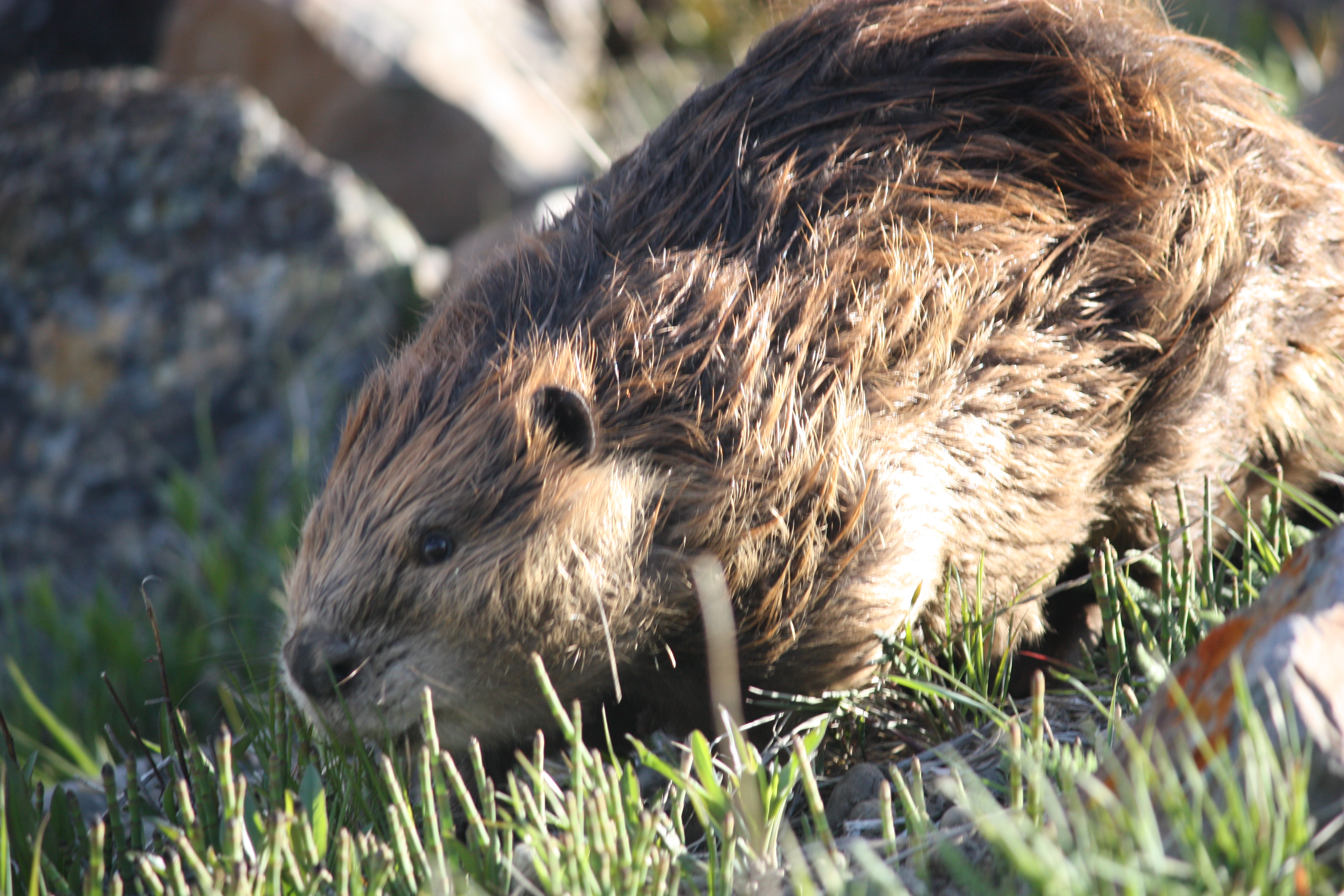
Castor canadensis, 'North American beaver'

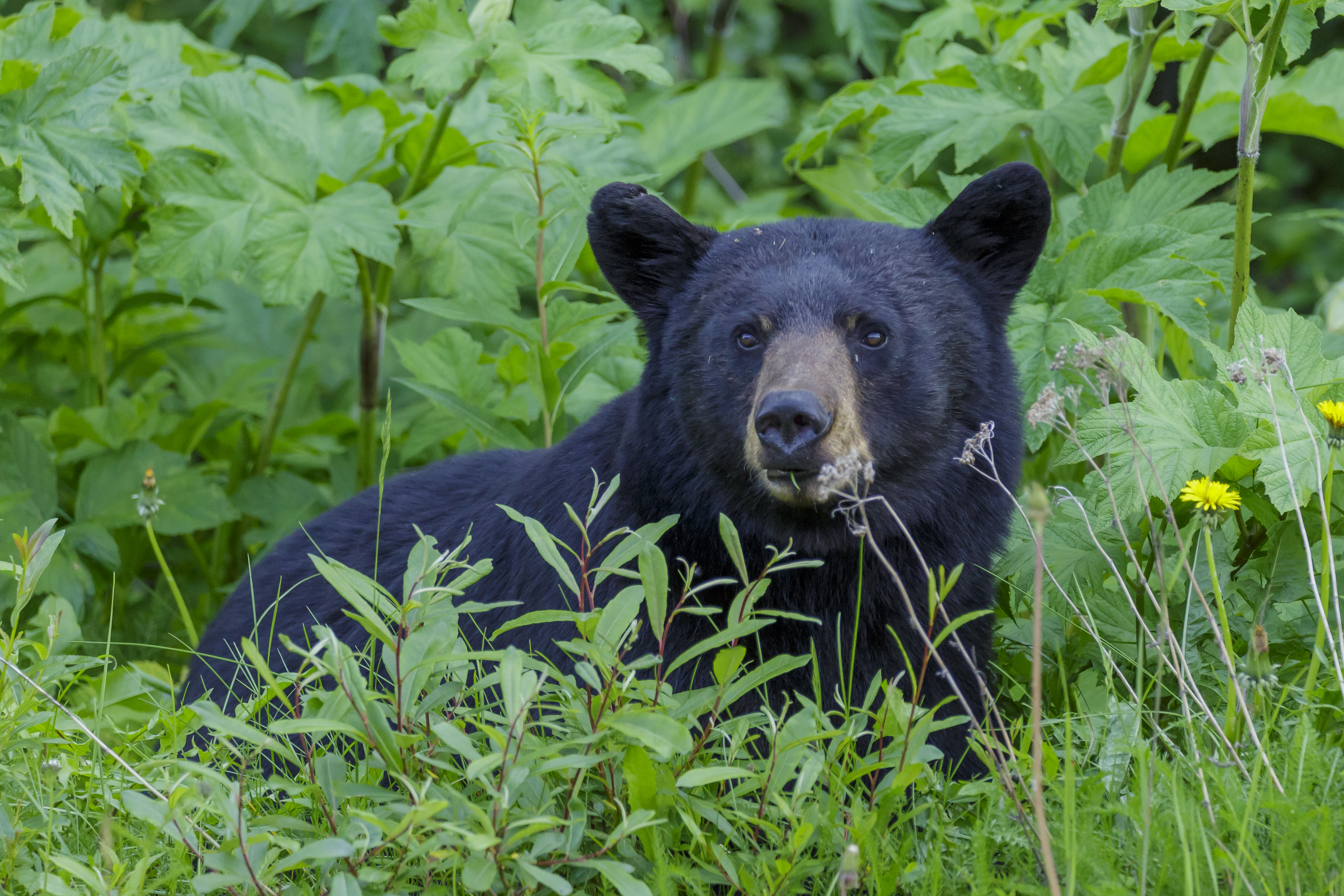
Ursus americanus, 'black bear'

Large mammals were valued for their meat, furs, skins that could be turned into leather for clothing and shoes, bones that could be fashioned into pins, needles, beads and hooks and sinews that were chewed into bowstrings and strong thread. Bears, with their large fat stores, were prized for the oils and greases that could be rendered from the flesh. Smaller mammals, generally caught in snares and various traps, were also eaten and used for their furs. With the exception of foxes and bears, most larger predators such as the eastern wolf, eastern coyote and mountain lion were left alone, possibly due to cultural and religious prohibitions. For coastal peoples, seals were often clubbed or speared when they fell asleep onshore and whales were captured in the large dugout canoes, such as that of the Wampanoag, or harvested when they beached ashore.

- Alces alces subsp. americana, 'eastern moose' or mꝏs (m8s) /muːs/
- Castor canadensis, 'beaver' or tummunck (tumôq) /təmãk/
- Cervus canadensis subsp. canadensis (extinct), 'eastern elk' or wampꝏs (wôp8s)
- Cetacea infraorder (excluding dolphins and porpoises), 'whale' or pꝏtab (p8tâp) /puːtaːp/
- Didelphis virginiana, 'possum'
- Erethizon dorsatum, 'porcupine'
- Family Leporidae, 'rabbits and hares' or muhtuckquass (mâhtuqâhs) /maːhtəkʷaːhs/
- Marmota monax, 'woodchuck' or okqutchaun (âqatyân) /aːkʷahtʲaːn/
- Mephitis mephitis, 'striped skunk' or squnck (sukôq) /səkãk/
- Odocoileus virginianus, 'deer' of attucke (ahtuhq) /ahtəhk/
- Ondatra zibethicus, 'muskrat' or musquash (musqâhs) /məskʷaːhs/
- Neogale macrodon (extinct), 'sea mink'
- Family Phocidae, 'seals'
- Procyon lotor, 'raccoon' or aussupp (âhsup) /aːhsəp/
- Ursus americanus, 'black bear' or masq (masq) /mask/
- Vulpes vulpes, 'red fox' or wonqussis (wôquhsees)

==== Birds ====
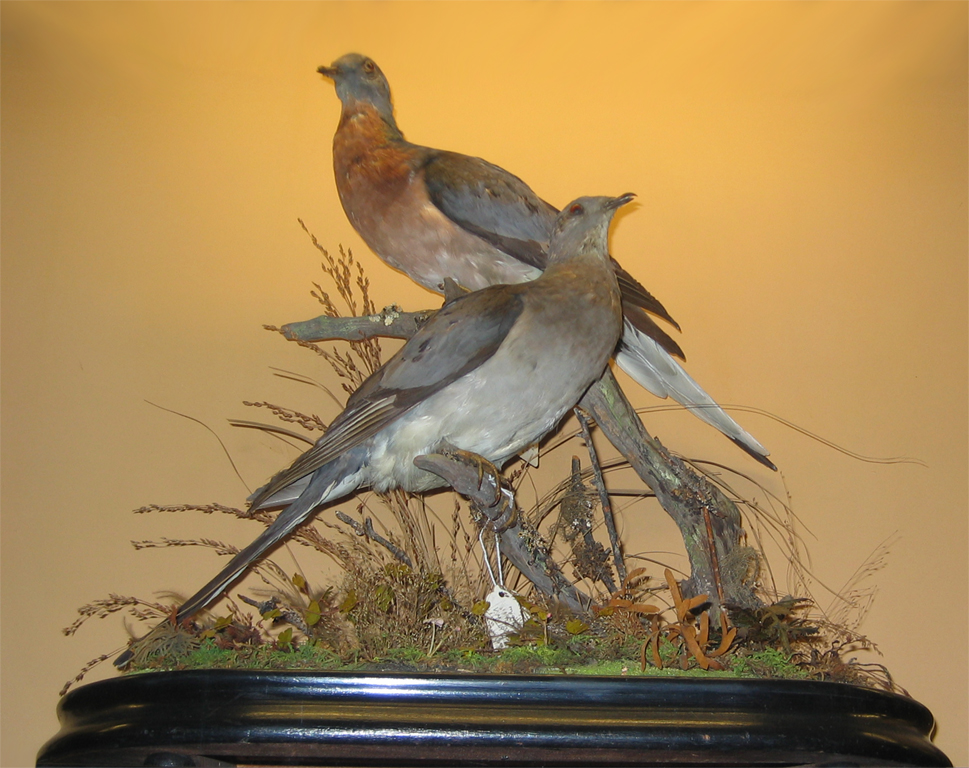
Ectopistes migratorius, 'passenger pigeon' (extinct)

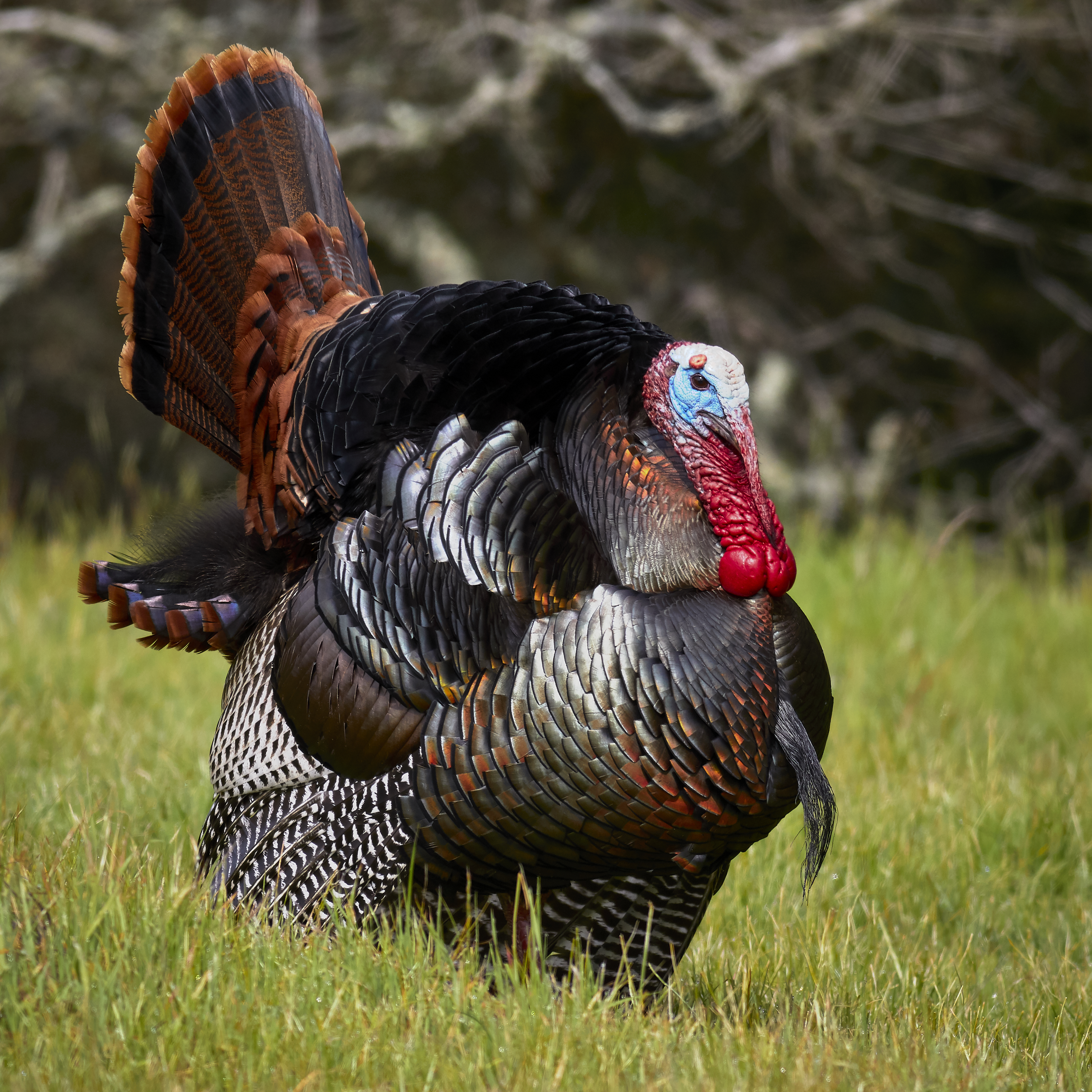
Meleagris gallopavo, 'wild turkey'

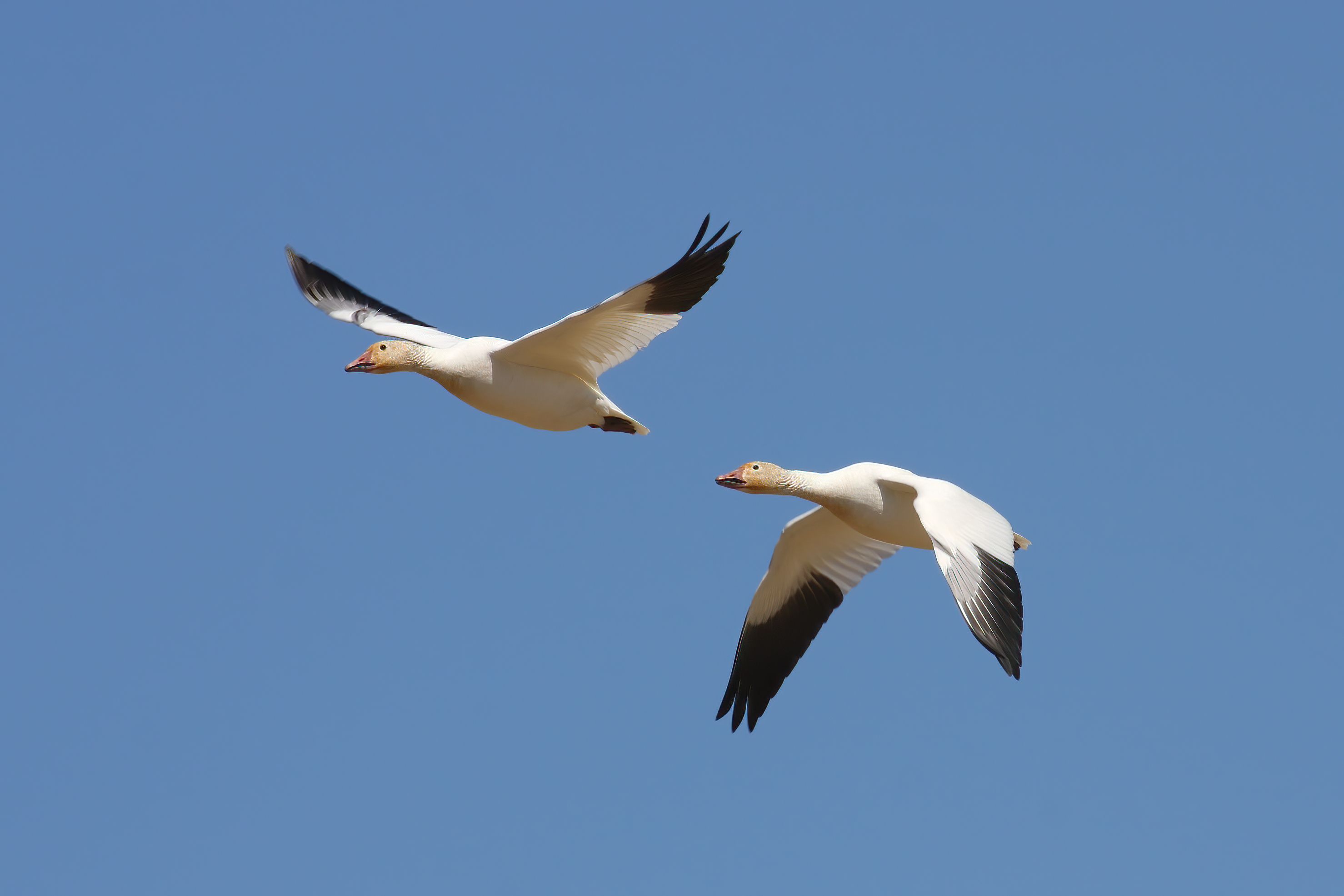
Answer caerulescens, 'snow goose'

Geese, turkeys, ducks and swans were captured with nets or bow and arrow. Cormorants were simply strangled as they slept. Aside from the larger waterfowl and turkey, the most important birds were likely the extinct passenger pigeon, whose dense, large flocks allowed for hundreds to be caught during their migration. Brightly colored feathers were often woven into woven blankets and cloaks of chiefs for decoration while larger feathers were adorned the hair or were fashioned into decorative items. Large birds of prey, such as eagles, hawks, vultures and owls, and crows and ravens were avoided, likely due to religious and cultural prohibitions. Eggs, occasionally gathered by Indian women, were added into soups and stews.

- Agelaius phoeniceus, 'red-winged blackbird'
- Aix sponsa, 'wood duck'
- Anas platyrhynchos, 'mallard duck'
- Anas rubripes, 'American black duck'
- Ardea alba, 'great egret'
- Anser caerulescens, 'snow goose' or wompatuck wôpuhtuq
- Branta canadensis, 'Canada goose' or honck (hôk)
- Colinus virginianus, 'northern bobwhite'
- Ectopistes migratorius, 'passenger pigeon' (extinct) or wuskuhwhunan
- Egretta caerulea, 'little blue heron'
- Meleagris gallopavo , 'wild turkey' or néyhom (naham) /naham/
- Mergus merganser, 'common merganser'
- Phalacrocorax sp. 'cormorants' or kuttis (kutuhs) /kətəhs/
- Poecile atricapilla, 'black-capped chickadee'
- Rallus limicola, 'Virginia rail'
- Quiscalus quiscula, 'common grackle'
- Spizella pusilla, 'field sparrow'
- Tympanuchus cupido sub. cupido, 'heath hen' (extinct)
- Zenaida macroura, 'mourning dove'

==== Reptiles and amphibians ====
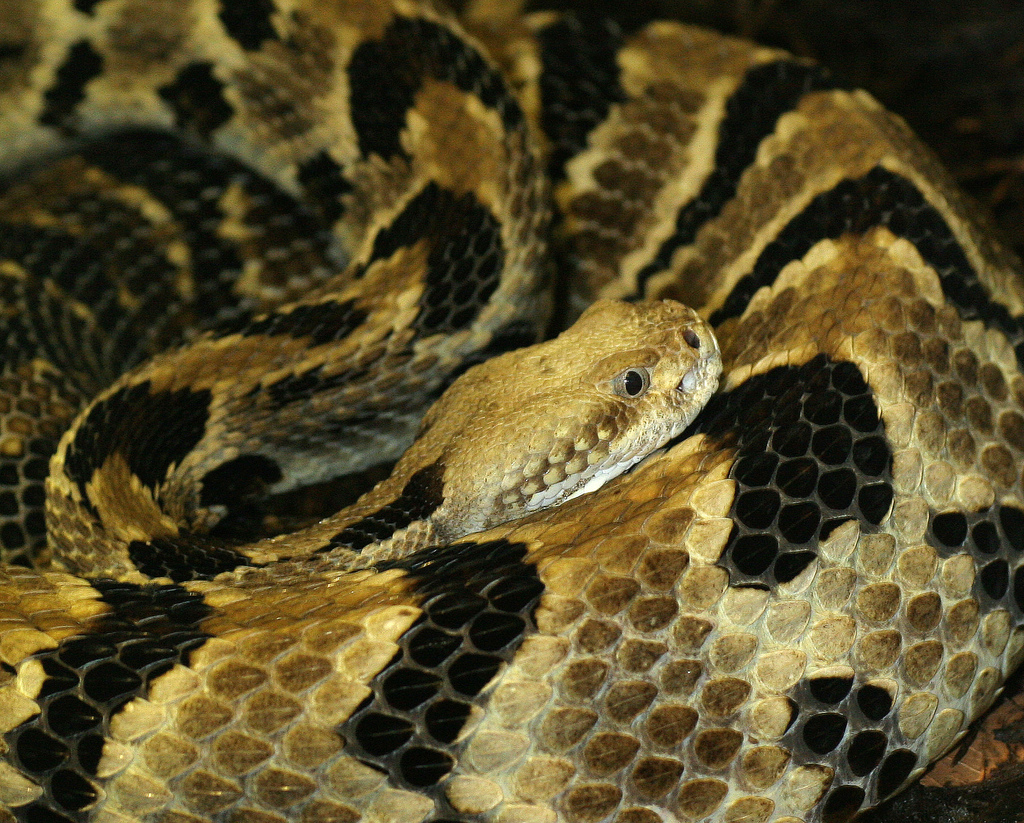
Crotalus horridus, 'eastern timber rattlesnake'

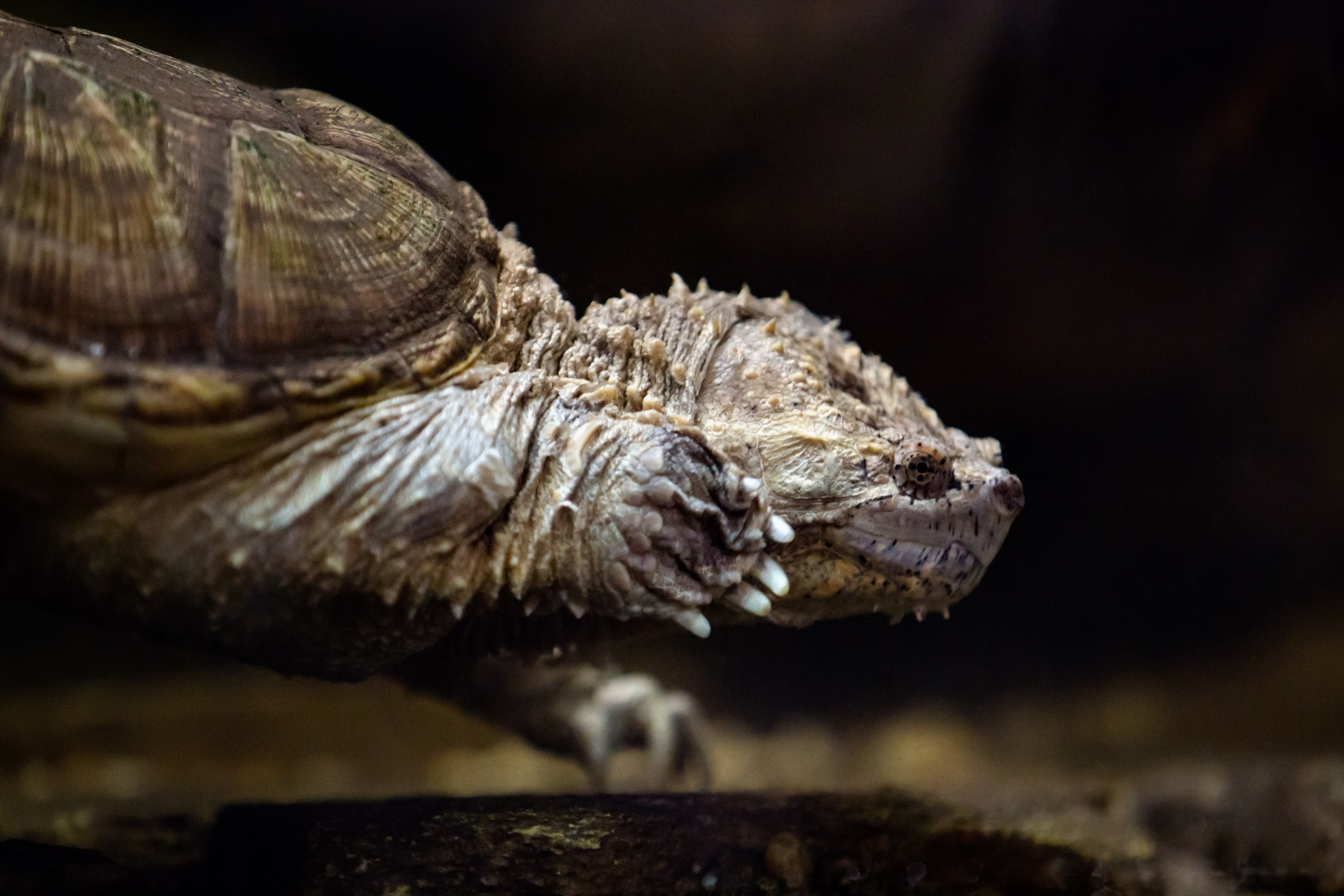
Chelydra serpentina, 'common snapping turtle'

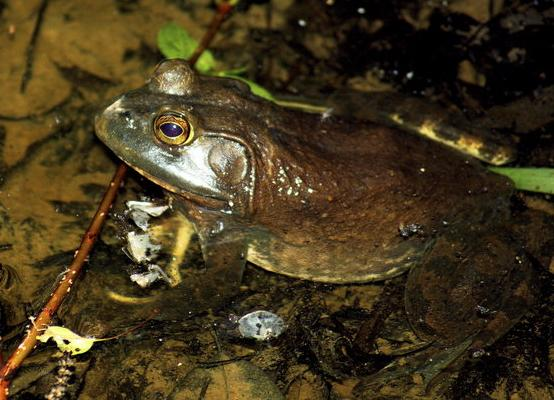
Lithobates catesbeianus, 'American bullfrog'

Various species of turtle and frog supplemented the diet. The skins of snakes were valued for belts, headbands and decorations, while turtle shells could be fashioned into jewelry and other decorative items.

- Chelydra serpentina, 'common snapping turtle'
- Clemmys guttata, 'spotted turtle'
- Chrysemys picta, 'painted turtle'
- Crotalus horridus, 'timber rattlesnake' or séseckq (seehseeq) /siːhsiːk/)
- Glyptemys insculpta, 'wood turtle'
- Lithobates catesbeianus, 'American bullfrog'
- Lithobates clamitans, 'American green frog'
- Lithobates pipiens, 'northern leopard frog'
- Nerodia sipedon, 'northern water snake'
- Pantherophis obsoletus, 'black rat snake'

=== Fished and collected foods ===
==== Fish ====
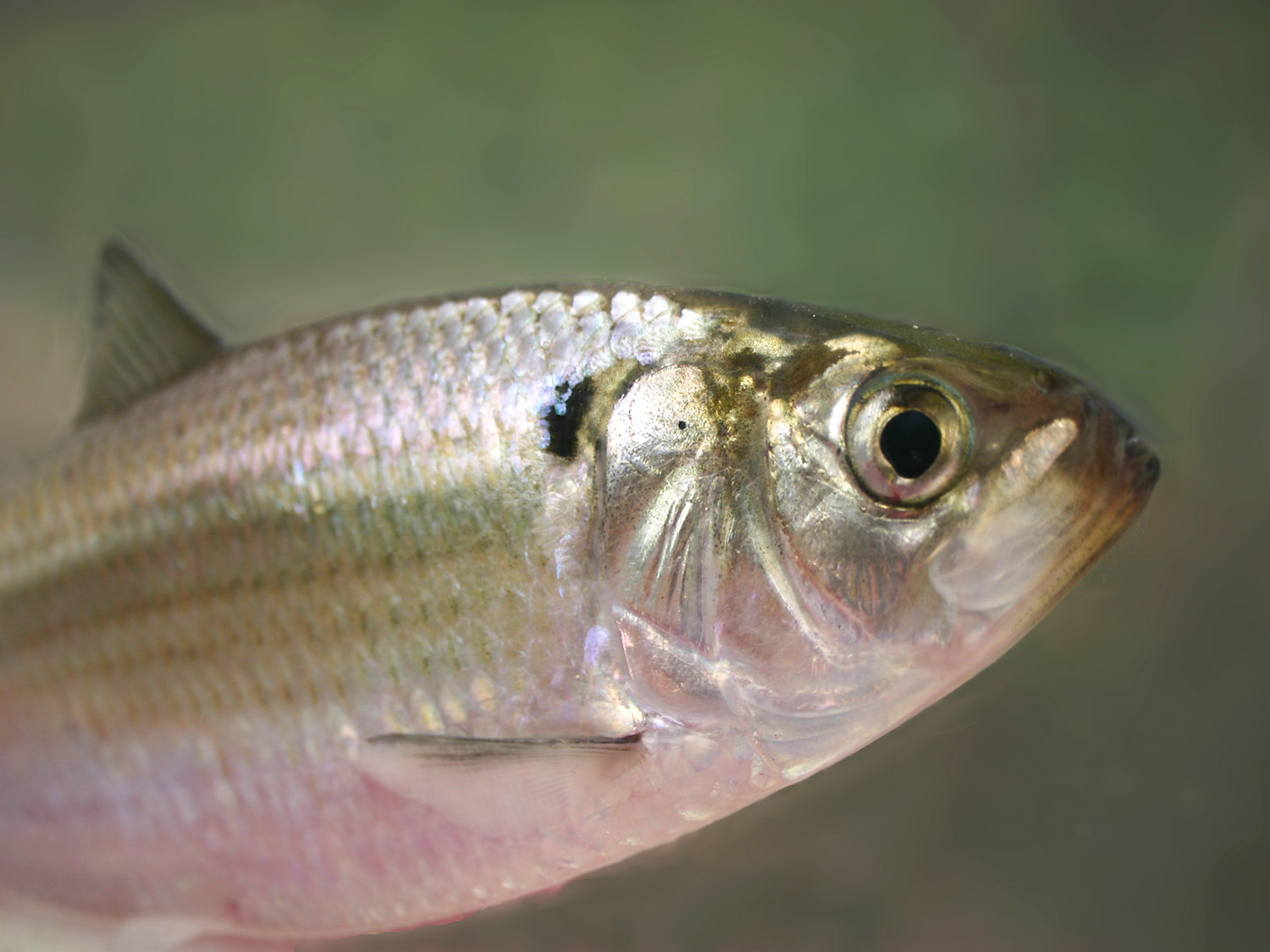
Dorosoma cepdianum or the 'gizzard shad.' River herring were caught in fish-weirs and nets during their spring spawning runs when they swam far upstream from the ocean. Many were dried and smoked for the winter or buried into the soil as fertilizer for crops.

Men were the traditional fishermen, and were also tasked with making the fishing spears, nets, lobster basket traps, baited lines, fishing line weights and fashioning hooks from bone, wood and stone. The long coastline provided peoples along the shore many options for fishing. Deep-sea fish were caught using weighted lines, or could be attracted to the surface with pummee (pumee) /pəmiː/, 'grease,' but specifically the residue of oily fish that were boiled to extract oil, in a process akin to chumming, where they could be netted easily. 'To go wigwassing' was a term adopted into colonial New England English for night fishing using torches to attract eel, squid and herring to the surface, from Massachusett weequash (weeqahsum) /wiːkwɑːhsəm/.

Interior peoples and coastal peoples gathered at waterfalls and rapids along rivers. The most important event was the annual spawning run of river herring, salmon, sea-run trout, lampreys and eels, attracting people from across the region to waterfalls and rapids or the mouths or rivers. Elaborate fish-weirs, such as the Boylston Street Fishweir, were constructed to channel the fish in rivers, or trap them with the outgoing tide, where they could be easily netted, speared or simply gathered in baskets. The people of the freshwater areas also had access to rivers, lakes, ponds and marshes where fish could be caught year round, with ice fishing practiced in the deep winters when other sources of food were scarce. Many of the fish species that were taken food are still important in New England, supporting commercial and sport fisheries. In New England today, many fish species are referred to with different names in the local dialect of English, many coming directly from Algonquian origins such as 'chogset,' known as the 'bergall' elsewhere, and the 'tautog,' which is better known as the 'oysterfish,' 'chub' or 'black porgy' in other regions of the United States.

===== Freshwater, catadromous or anadromous =====
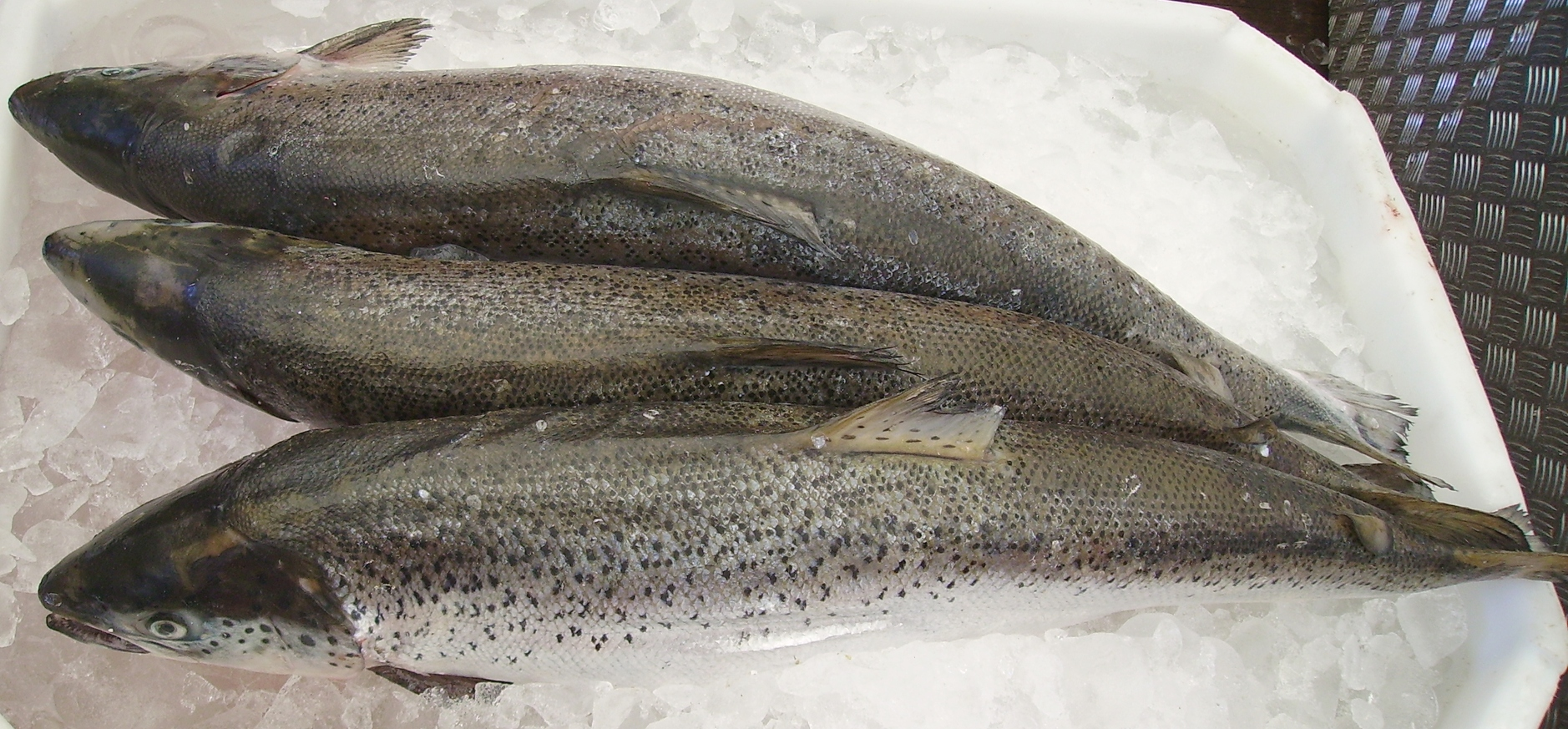
Salmo salar, 'Atlantic salmon' (locally extinct)

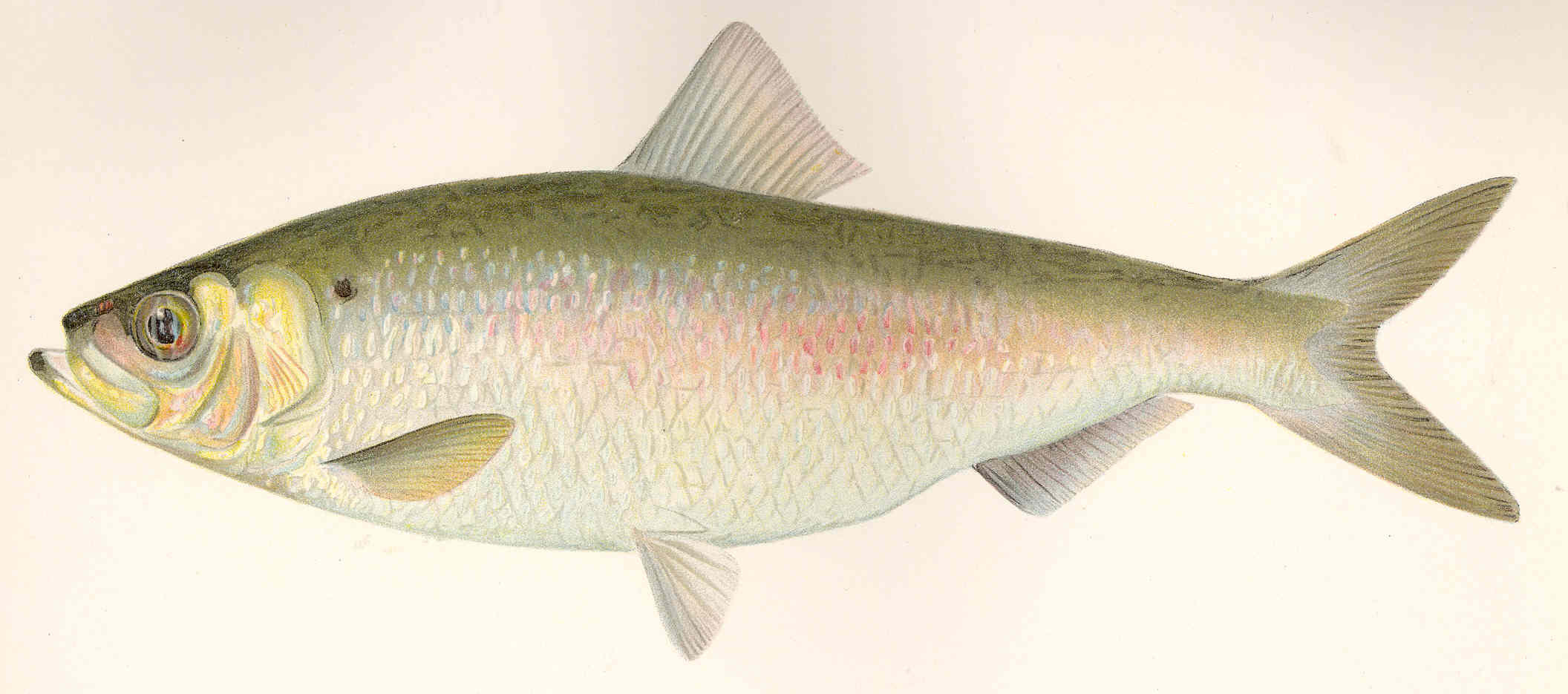
Alosa pseudoharengus, 'alewife'

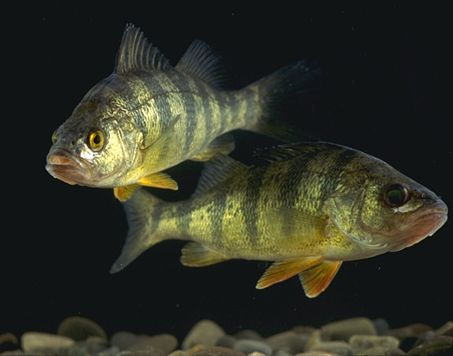
Persca flavescens, 'yellow pirch'
- Alosa pseudoharengus, 'alewife'
- Alosa aestivalis, 'blueback herring'
- Anguilla rostrata, 'American eel' or neeshaw (neeswôw) /niːswãw/
- Acipenser sp., 'sturgeon' or kauposh (kuhpahs) /kəhpahs/
- Brevoörtia tyrannus, 'Atlantic menhaden'
- Dorosoma cepedianum, 'gizzard shad'
- Esox americanus, 'American pickerel' or qunôsuqunôsuw /kʷənãsəw/
- Microgadus tomcod, 'tomcod' or paponaumsu (pap8namâhs)
- Morone saxatilis, 'striped bass'
- Perca flavescens, 'yellow perch'
- Salmo salar, 'Atlantic salmon'
- Salvelinus fontinalis, 'brook trout' or mishquskou
- Sander vitreus, 'walleye'

===== Saltwater =====
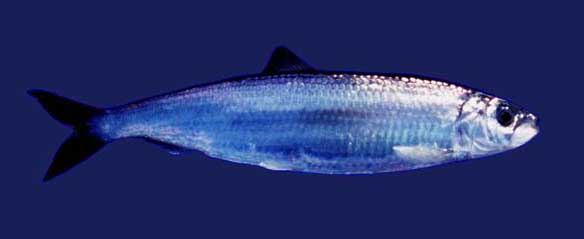
Clupea harengus, 'Atlantic herring'

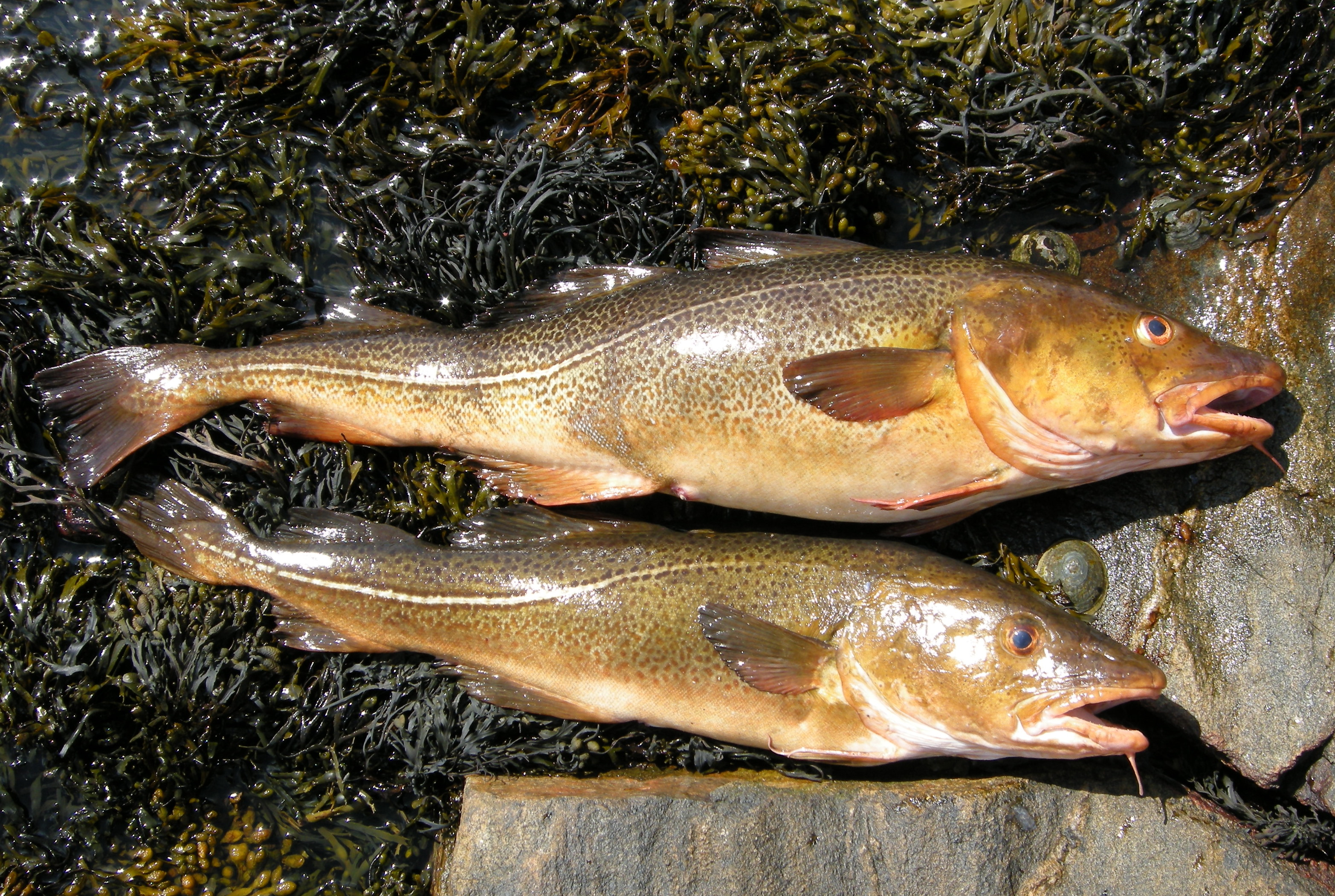
Gadus morhua, 'Atlantic cod'

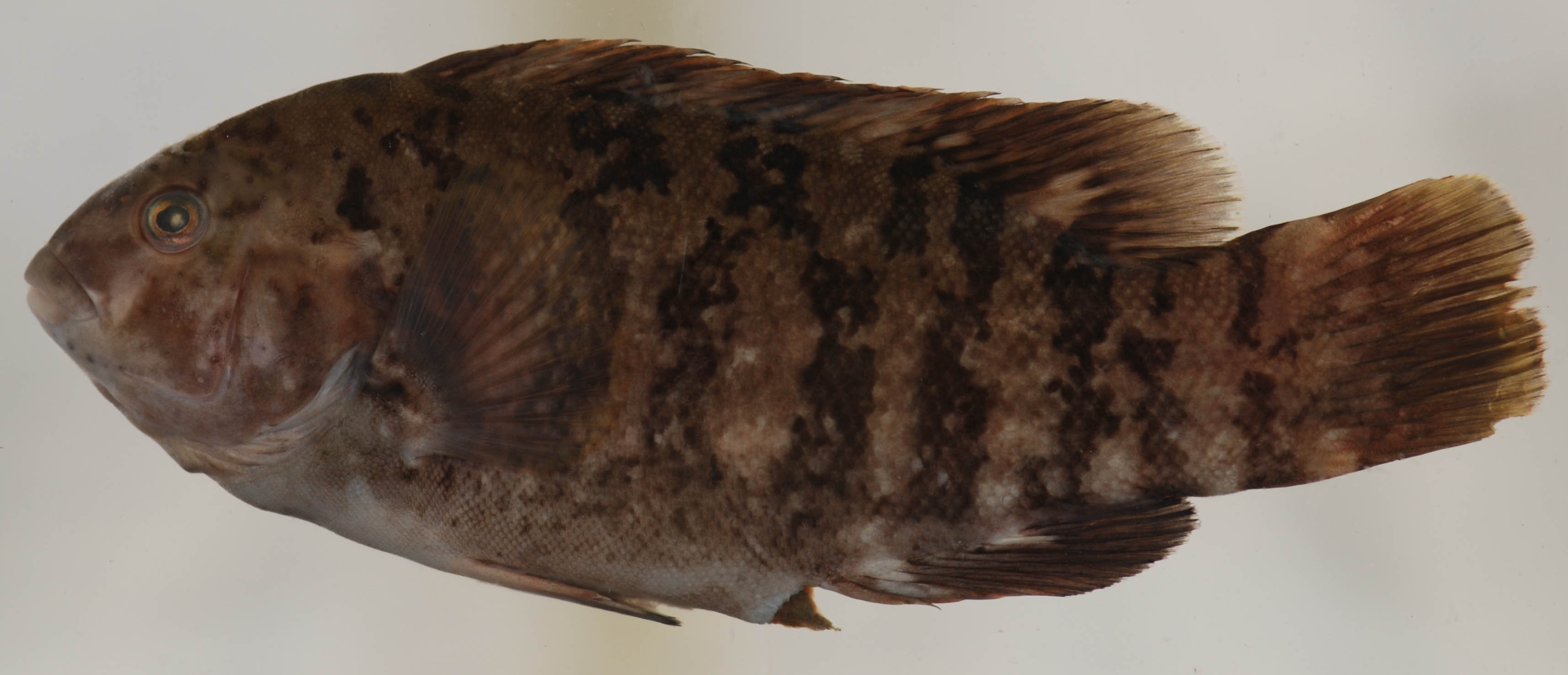
Tautoga onitis, locally known as 'tautog'
- Breviraja nigriventralis, 'blackbelly skate'
- Brosme brosme, 'cusk'
- Calamus penna, 'sheepshead porgy'
- Cetorhinus maximus, 'basking shark'
- Clupea harengus, 'Atlantic herring'
- Gadus morhua, 'Atlantic cod'
- Hippoglossoides platessoides, 'American plaice'
- Hippoglossus hippoglossus, 'Atlantic halibut'
- Lopholatilus chamaeleonticeps, 'great northern tilefish'
- Micropogonias undulatus, 'Atlantic croaker'
- Pleuronectes putnami, 'smooth flounder'
- Pomatomus saltatrix, 'bluefish'
- Family Sparidae, 'porgy' (possibly derived from Massachusett plural form [mishcu]paug)
- Stenotomus chrysops, 'scup,' 'scuppaug' or 'mischup' or mishcuppaug (muhskup)
- Tautoga onitis, 'tautog'
- Tautogolabrus adspersus, 'chogset' or chogsett (chahkusut)

==== Shellfish ====
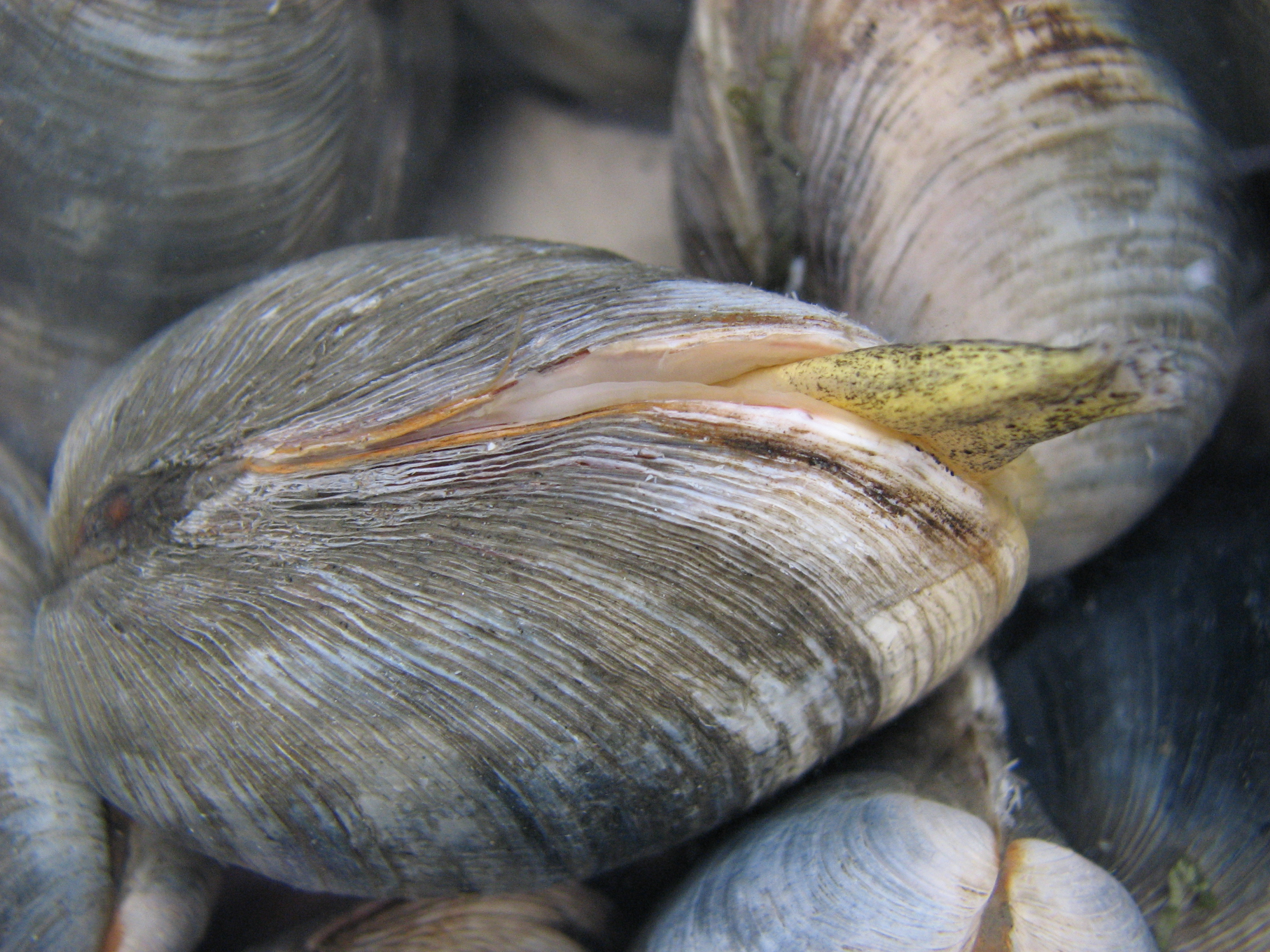
Mercenaria mercenaria, known locally as 'quahog'

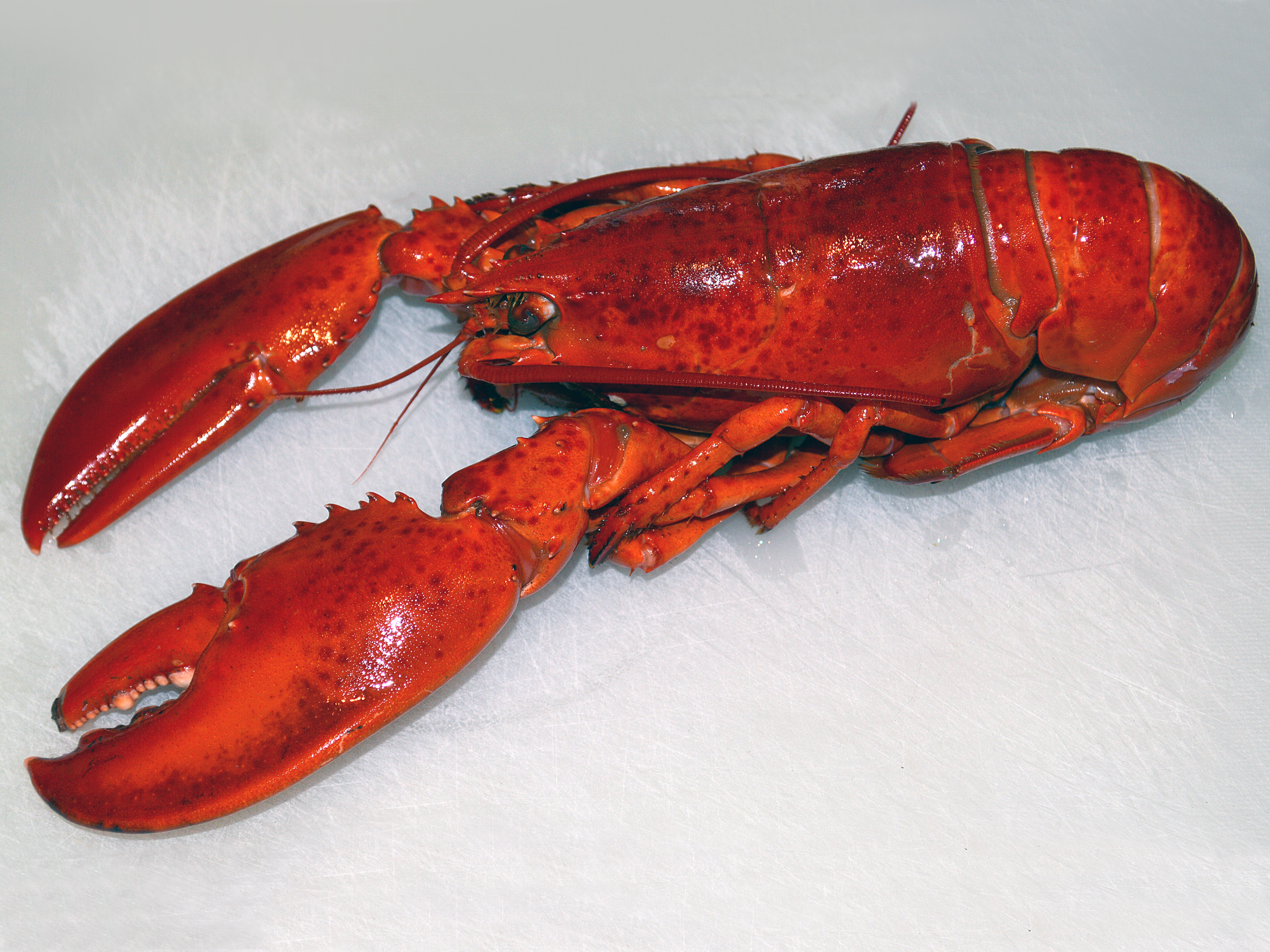
Homarus americanus, 'American lobster'

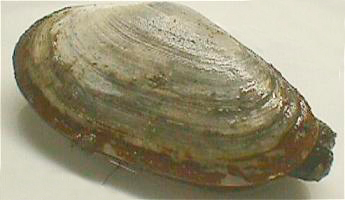
Mya arenaria, known locally as 'steamer clam'

Mollusks such as clams, snails, oysters and scallops were dug from the sands at low tide or picked off the rocks and was another traditional activity of Native women along the coast. Although men typically cast weighted nets and traps for lobsters and crabs, women would often catch ones stranded in pools during low tide. Urchins and sea cucumbers were likely also occasionally gathered and eaten. Freshwater clams were occasionally eaten by inland peoples, but not all species were edible and they were more prone to contamination, and most inland peoples traded for dried clams from coastal peoples.

- Argopecten irradians, 'bay scallop'
- Crassostrea virginica, 'eastern oyster'
- Elliptio complanata, 'eastern elliptio' (freshwater)
- Ensis leei, 'jackknife clam'
- Homarus americanus, 'lobster'
- Lampsilis radiata, 'eastern lampmussel' (freshwater)
- Ligumia nasuta, 'eastern pondmussel' (freshwater)
- Hyas araneus, 'great spider crab'
- Mercenaria mercenaria, 'quahog,' from Massachusett plural poohquahaug (p8hqâhak) /puːhkʷaːhak/
- Mya arenaria, 'soft-shell clam' (steamers)
- Mytilus edulis, 'blue mussel'
- Procambarus acutus, 'white river crayfish' (freshwater)
- Quadrula quadrula, 'mapleleaf mussel'
- Strongylocentrotus droebachiensis, 'green sea urchin'
- Pandalus borealis, 'pink shrimp'

=== Famine foods ===
When food stores were low due to crop failures, drought, longer than usual winters and game were scarce, the Native peoples resorted to other foods. It is known that the Native peoples would resort to eating bark, the youngest pine leaves and certain types of lichens in winter or when traveling long distances. In warmer seasons, the Native peoples could dig up worms and grubs, rely on catching smaller game and broadened their range. Since the European settlers did not understand how much foraging and gathering contributed to their diet, many Indians died of starvation or were forced into dangerous and menial work as their lands were usurped or forcibly sold by colonial and later state governments.

== Cooking and preservation methods ==
=== Cooking ===
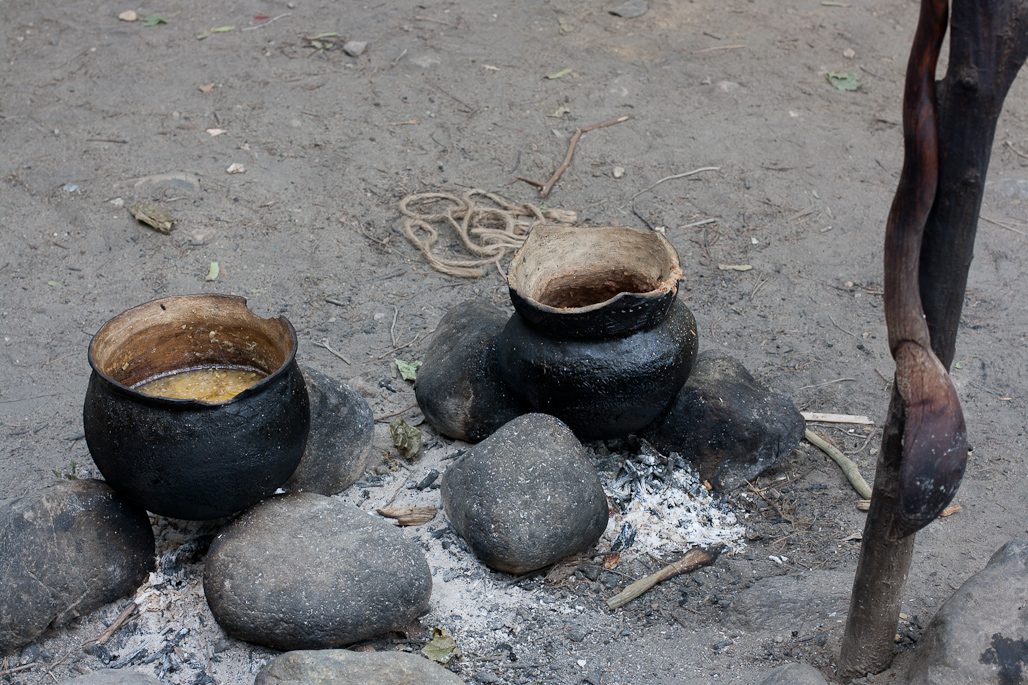
Traditional cooking setup in SNEA cuisine recreated in the Wampanoag style at Plimoth Plantation.

Soups, stews, broths and dumplings were cooked in large conical pots, supported upright with large rocks around which a fire was built and the flaming embers pushed under the pots. Less liquid was used for stewing corn, beans and various porridges, with the heat kept in with the use of reed mats. As these clay pots were heavy and prone to breaking, they were seldom moved, and required that more permanent places of habitation were always located near convenient sources of freshwater. When traveling, since the pots did not travel, lightweight and watertight birch bark vessels were strung over the fire, with the birch bark not catching on fire due to its liquid contents. An older method of heating water involved adding stones heated until glowing in the fires into the pots after the ingredients were assembled, but this method was dying out at the time of arrival of the English colonists in the early seventeenth century and was only known from isolated areas. As a result of contacts with the English colonists, the Native peoples traded for the copper and brass kettles which were lightweight and heated faster.

Roasting quickly over the flames to sear the flesh was done with freshly caught meat and game, but usually food was cooked slowly over the embers, with chunks of meat or whole skinned birds and descaled fish simply staked and placed over the heat or sticks were lashed together to make frames from which food was hung. To flavor the meat and keep it moist, oils and animal greases were used to baste it, and aromatic bark and herbs were added to the fire, providing subtle flavor from the smoke. Although the Native peoples would sometimes eat freshly caught game, fish or shellfish raw or only lightly seared, but this was only possible if it eaten immediately. Most foods were cooked thoroughly before consumption, with the exception of some fresh greens and various fruits and berries. Fish were also cooked on wooden planks over the hot stones.

Baking of bread was done several different ways. When large leaves were available, such as cornhusks or lily pads, the unleavened dough of cornmeal or other meal were wrapped and placed in the hot ashes, although this was also done without leaves similar to the production of Australian damper. The dough could also be placed in greased cooking pots, placed on top of hot stones or placed on planks of wood over hot ashes. For large gatherings, earth ovens were constructed, with deep pits filled with stones over which fires were lit. Once the stones were hot, the pit was filled with damp leaves or seaweed and then covered with leaves or earth. This traditional practice is the inspiration for the New England clam bake traditions, but was also done with various root vegetables, fish, breads, meats or other plentiful foods, but because it is so labor-intensive, was limited to large gatherings. Shellfish, fish and meat were often simply baked on hot stones. Ovens and the adoption of metal and ceramic dishes for cooking replaced earlier methods over the course of the eighteenth century.

Frying, although not a common cooking method of the early English colonists, was introduced by the settlers. Occasionally, foods were cooked in copious amounts of grease until slightly browned such as the SNEA ancestor of the Johnnycake, but deep-frying and pan-frying techniques were not traditionally part of the cooking techniques of SNEA peoples.

=== Preservation ===
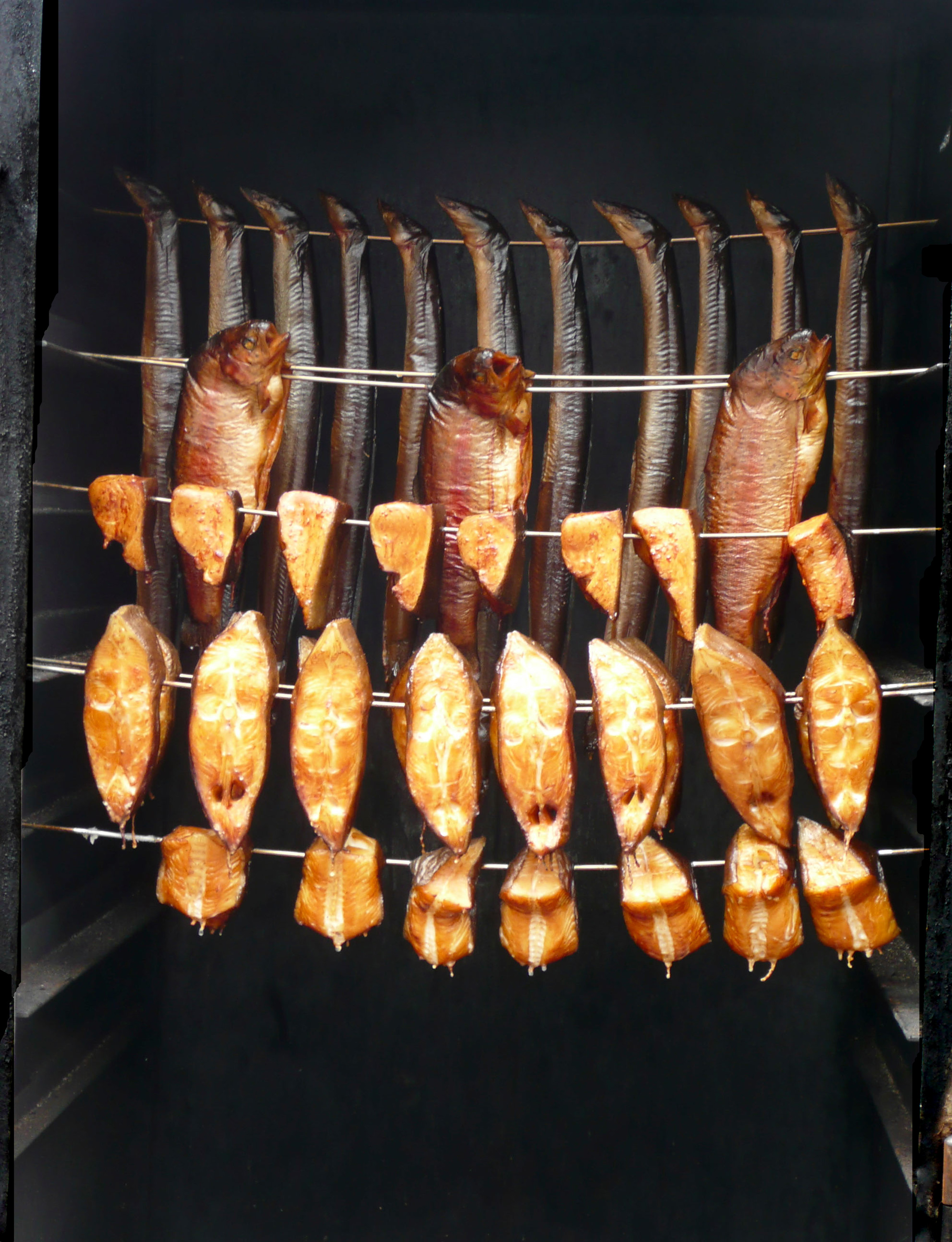
Eels and other fish cured by smoking. Preservation of meat, shellfish and fish by smoking was necessary so food could be stored away during times of want.

The long winters were lean times when little was available, so considerable amount of time was spent by Indian women preparing foods. Beans were shelled and pumpkins, squash and various fruit were cut in thin slices and laid out in the sun to dry. Corn was either dried on the cob or shelled, stamped into meal or parboiled then dried and ground. Fish were splayed and lean cuts of meat could also be prepared this way. Some foods, such as raspberry leaves and the unfurled leaves of skunk cabbage, which were used as both medicine, flavoring and a vegetable were only edible after dried. Many plants used as medicine also had to be prepared by drying. Granary pits, lined with stones and mats of woven reeds, were filled with bags of corn and baskets of food, later sealed with reed mats and earth until food stores were needed.

Lean cuts of meat were cut into thin strips and small fish were splayed and dried for preservation. Fattier cuts, oily fish and mollusks such as lobsters, crabs, clams, squid and snails had to be smoked as they were prone to spoilage even with proper drying. When large amounts of food needed to be processed, a smoking hut, essentially a wigwam without ventilation, was constructed. This was particularly done during the spawning fish runs of Atlantic salmon, American eel and various types of oily herring when large numbers of fish were caught as well as for the large shellfish harvest before the autumn. Dried bark of sassafras and hickory trees were prized for their billowy smoke and flavoring from volatile oils which facilitated the preservation. Sometimes dried herbs and other aromatic barks were added to the fire to add additional subtle flavors.

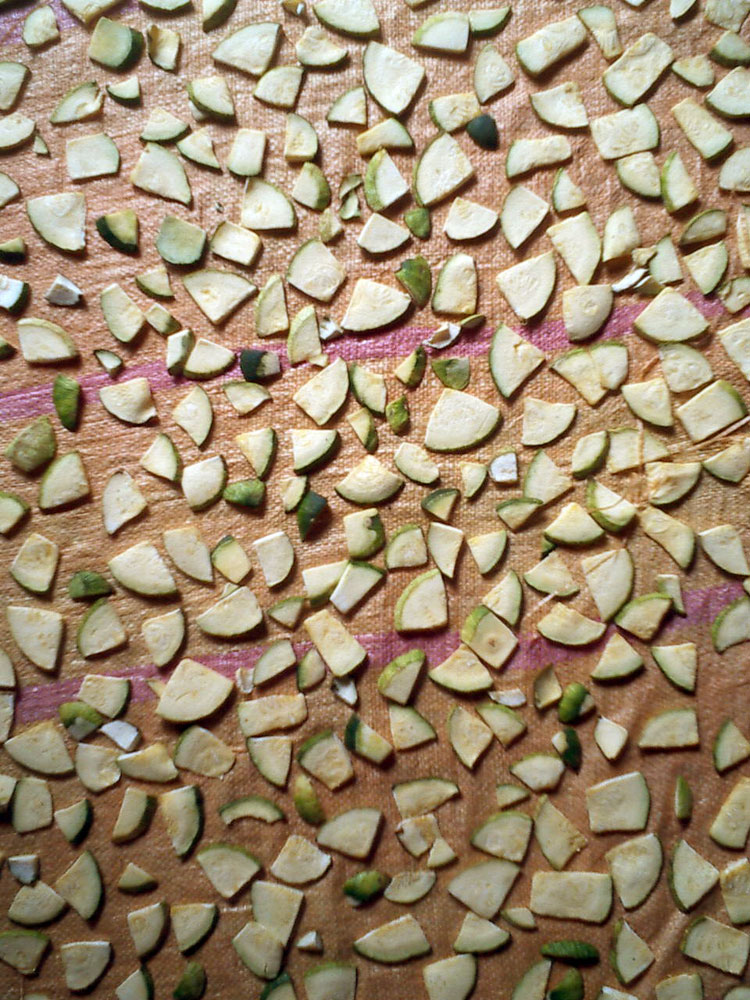
Thin slices of green pumpkin drying. Drying was an important preservation method.

Fruit was also boiled down to produce various syrups or 'Indian jams' that were used as sweeteners, flavoring or medicine. Sometimes, this was simply accomplished by chopping fruit and berries into small pieces that were boiled with water. To hasten the process, sometimes the fruit was cooked in syrups, either finished products or syrups produced by sweet flowers of edible Viburnum species or tree saps, such as the maple syrup produced by the peoples of the cooler upland areas or the harder to produce birch syrup. Foods were traditionally not consumed to the same sweetness as the English colonists, although through colonial contact, Native cooks began to adopt molassess, honey and sugar and the preparation of fruits and jellies in their fashion.

Salt-curing and fermentation were previously unknown, and the Indians initially were averse to the salty foods of the colonists. By the mid-eighteenth century with changing tastes and the adoption of animal husbandry from the English settlers, Indians began to produce hams and other cured meats similar to their new neighbors, but it was a slow adoption process. Fermentation is similarly unknown and unmentioned in colonial sources, although Native peoples also adopted the drinking and production of hard cider and beer, although the adoption of alcohol was detrimental as the culture did not have a history or genetic tolerance to drinking hard spirits.

== Dining habits and eating customs ==
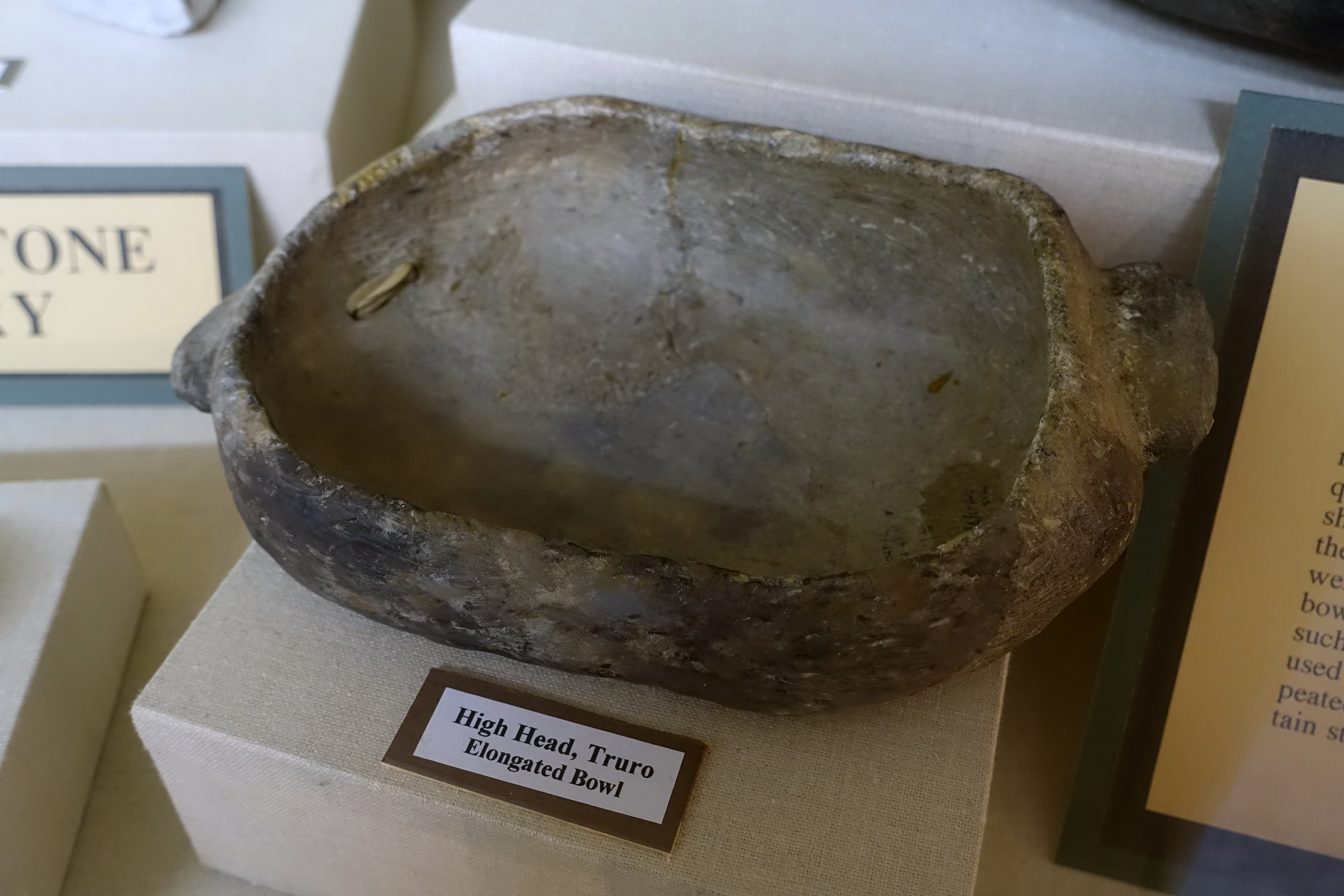
Carved steatite bowl from the Late Archaic Period discovered in Truro, Massachusetts. Food was often served in bowls like these, but were also made from carved wood and clay.

The Native peoples of southern New England were considered quite generous and hospitable, and guests to Indian homes were always welcomed with a refreshing drink of water and a share in whatever food was available or a meal when the food was completed. Groups of families would pool their resources, with men contributing meat and fish and women foraging, farming and preparing meals together, and also because of the labor-intensive and time consuming preparations of thick stews and breads that constituted most meals.

Meals, however, were not structured in the way of the English colonists, who ideally ate three meals a day every day. The Native peoples, dependent on seasonal abundance, were said to eat plentiful foods during times of abundance, labelled as 'gluttons' by the English colonists, but during lean times, war, hunting expeditions or travels between seasonal encampments, Native peoples could go days without a proper meal, subsisting on dried slices of squash and a spoonful or two of parched cornmeal and whatever could be foraged along the way, enough just to stave off the hunger.

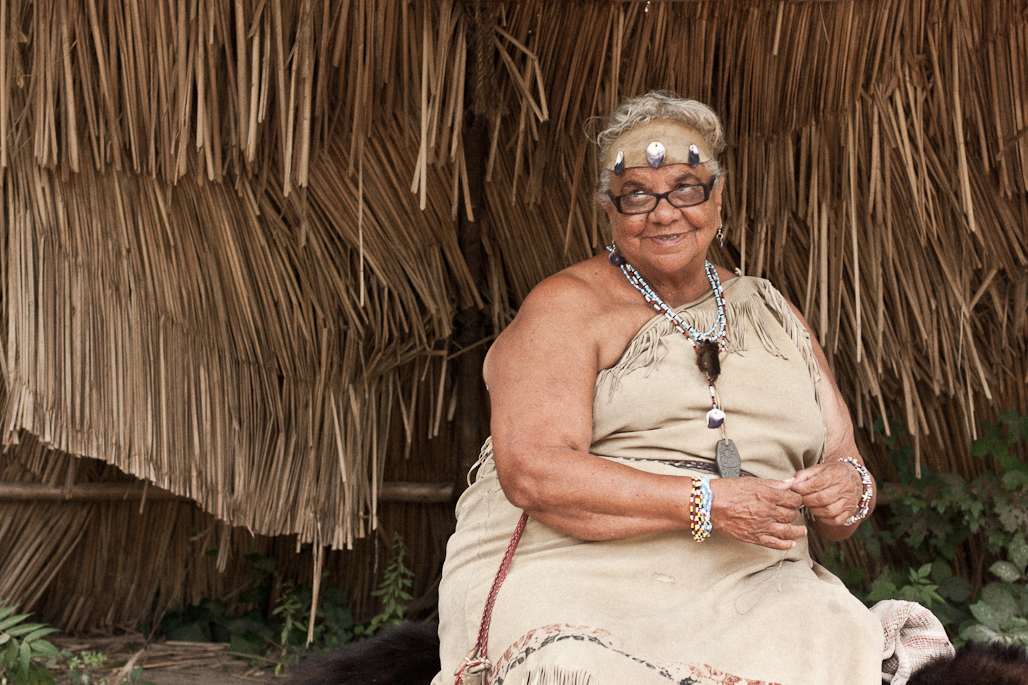
Wampanoag woman at Plimoth Plantation. The reed mats behind her were also used as plates to serve food, cushions to sit on the floor or to soften the benches built inside traditional wetus.

Although women performed all the tasks of preparing and serving the food, with the chiefs, elders and guests served first. Due to the matrilineal culture and more equitable treatment of women in Indian households, despite the fact that women were tasked with all the preparation and serving of the food and marked division of labor, women were not excluded from sitting to eat with men and were allowed to contribute to the mealtime conversation. Chiefs, who could also be women, elders and honored guests were served first as a mark of respect and courtesy. English colonial women were often excluded from the tables of formal dinners and ate separately with the children.

Foods were typically served when they were ready. Soups and various types of corn gruel were ladled into carved wooden or clay bowls and eaten with carved wooden spoons or spoons made from shells, whereas dryer foods were placed in wooden or clay dishes or placed in baskets or simply let on mats of reeds. Meals could be eaten on mats of reeds on the ground in 'Indian style' seating or benches built along the sides of the home. English colonial households ate in a similar fashion, as the utensils commonly used in England were expensive and difficult to import to the colonies.

== Dishes ==
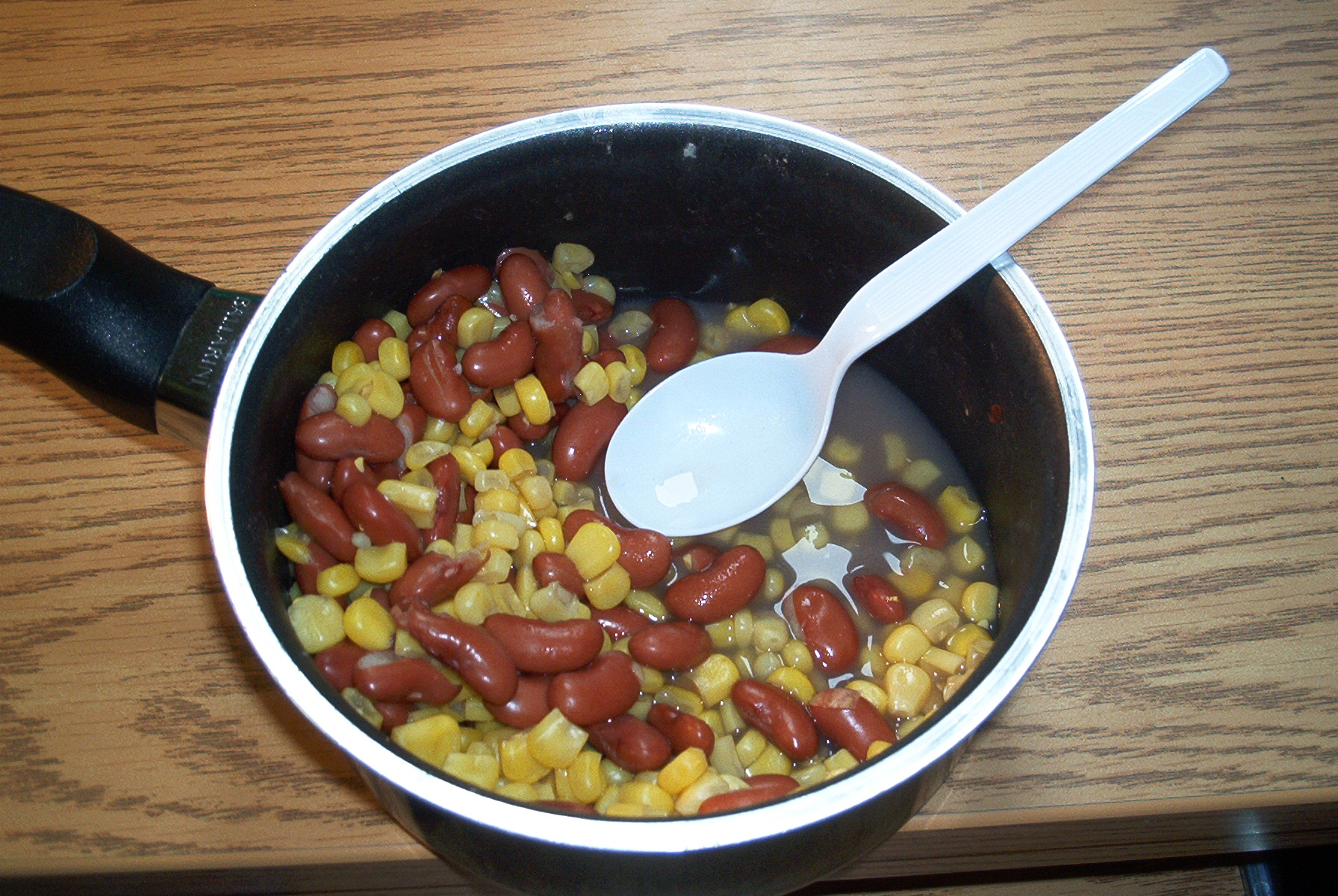
Succotash, a stewed mixture of corn with lima or other kinds of beans.

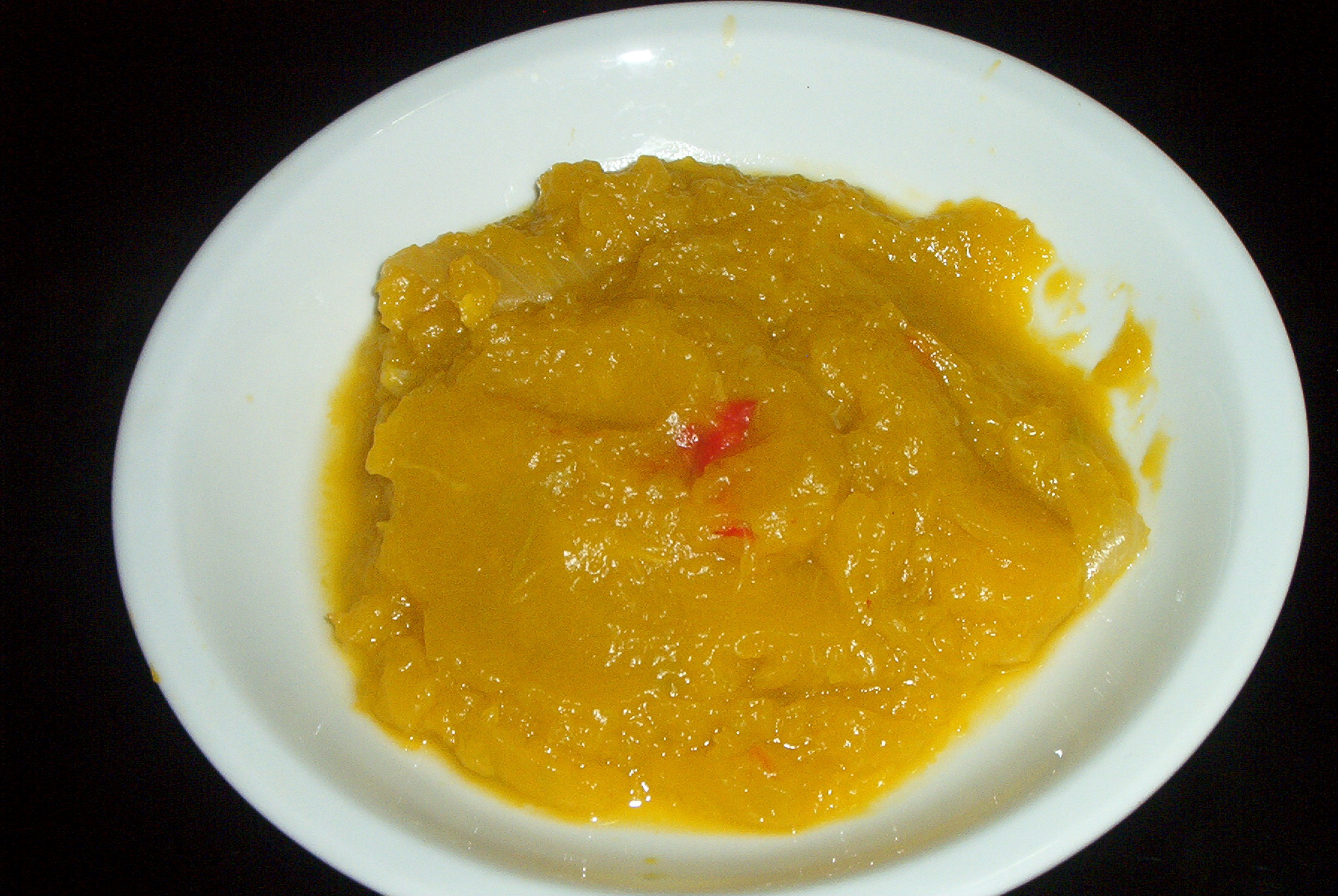
Mashed squash

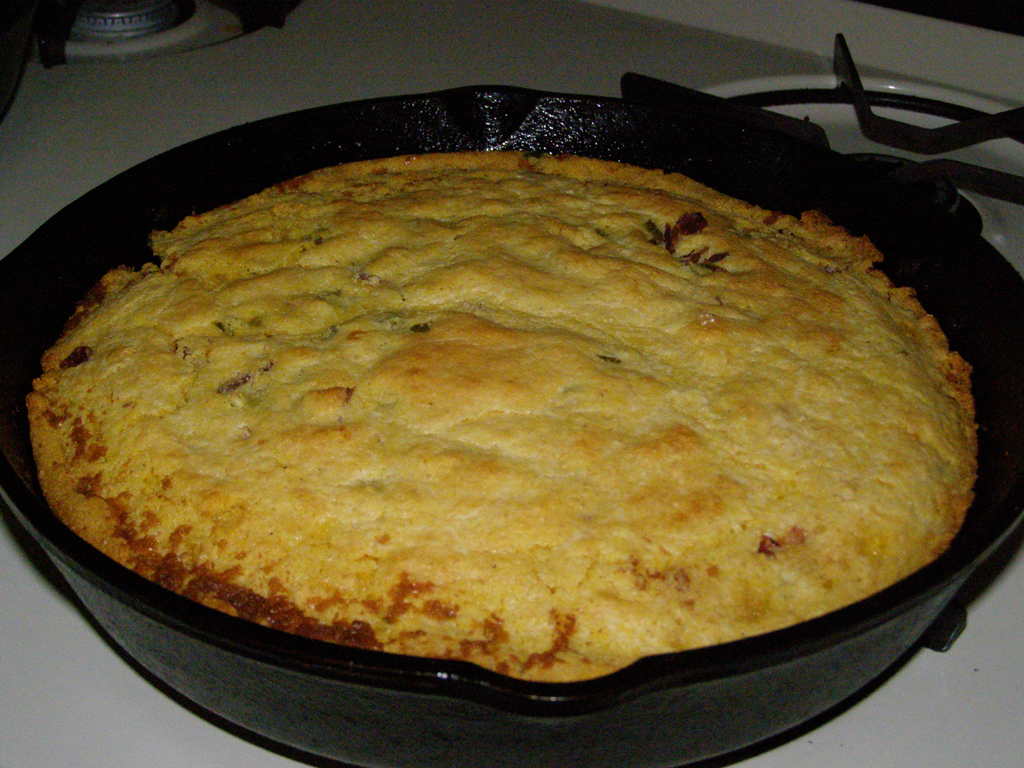
Petuckqunneg (Putuqunuk), Cornbread

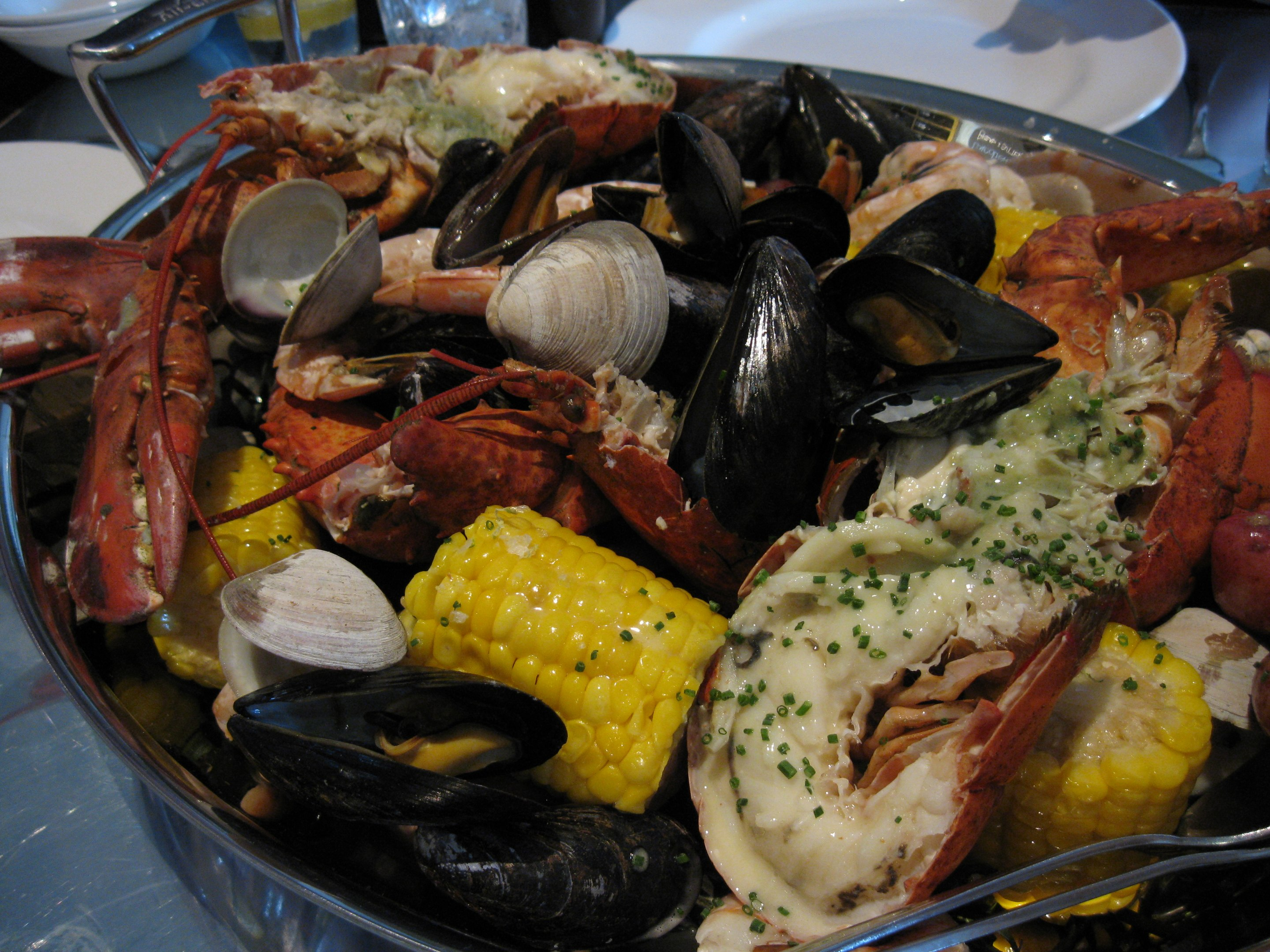
New England clam bake

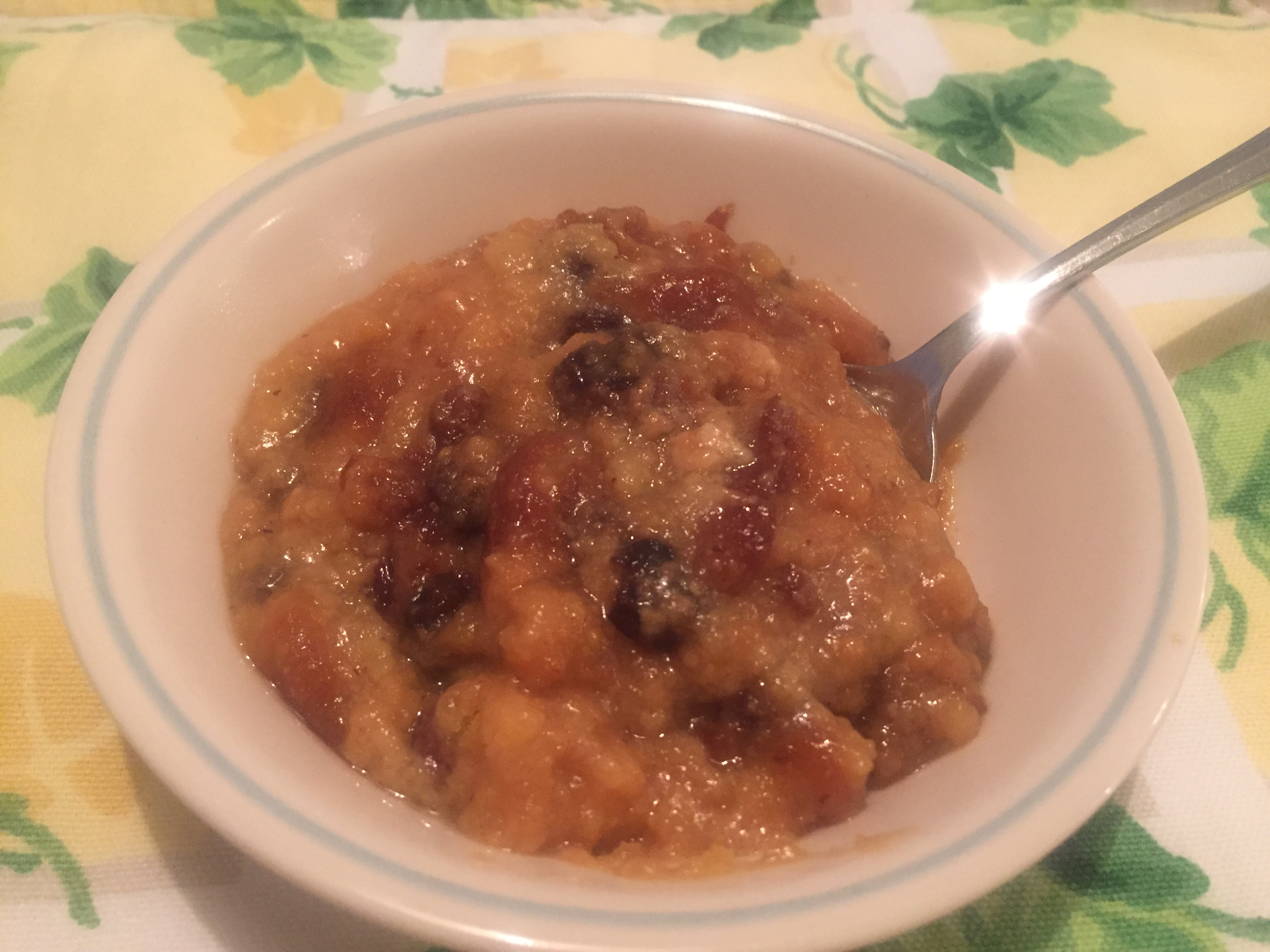
Indian pudding

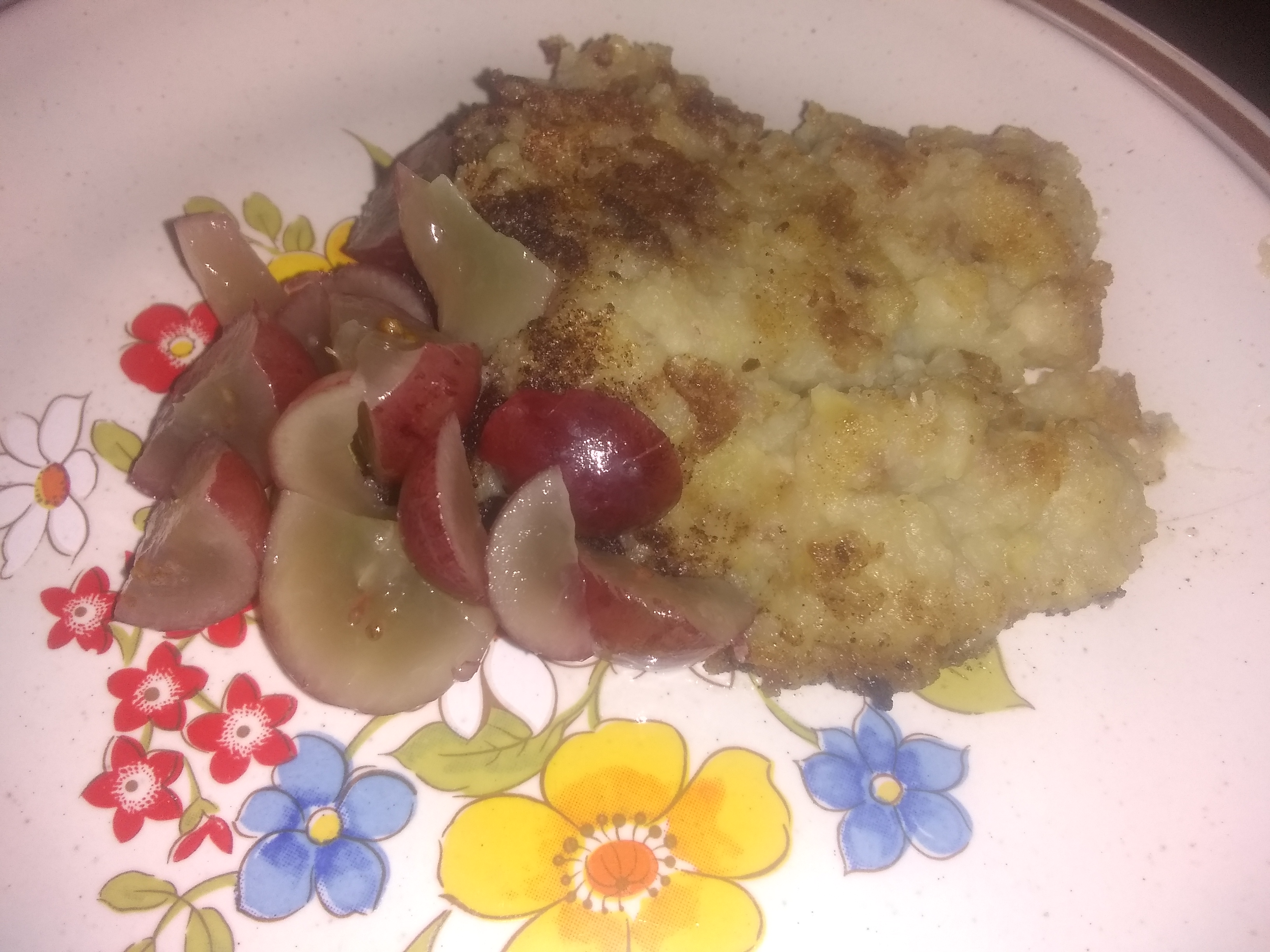
Chestnut cake

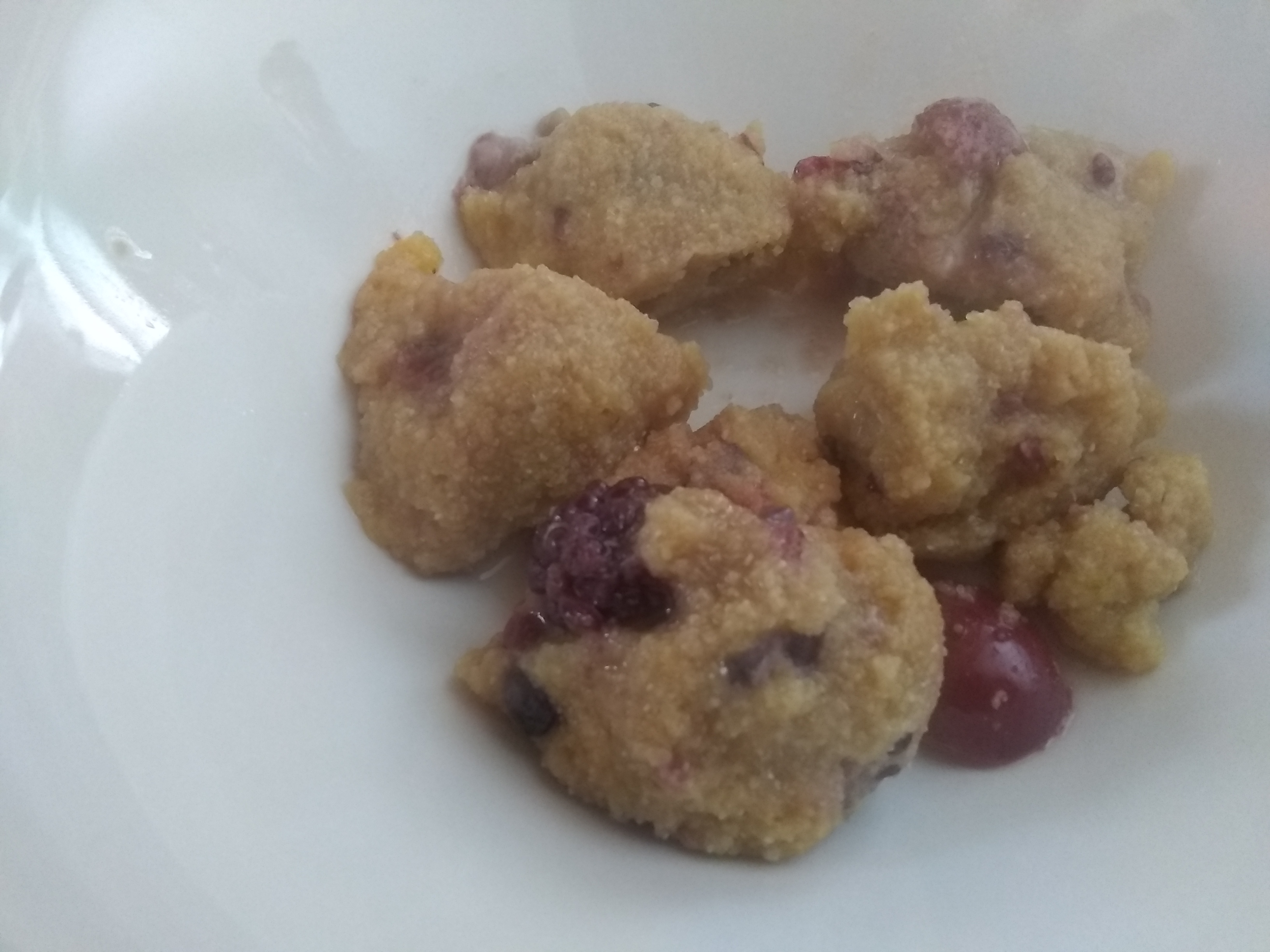
Indian berry dumplings with maple syrup

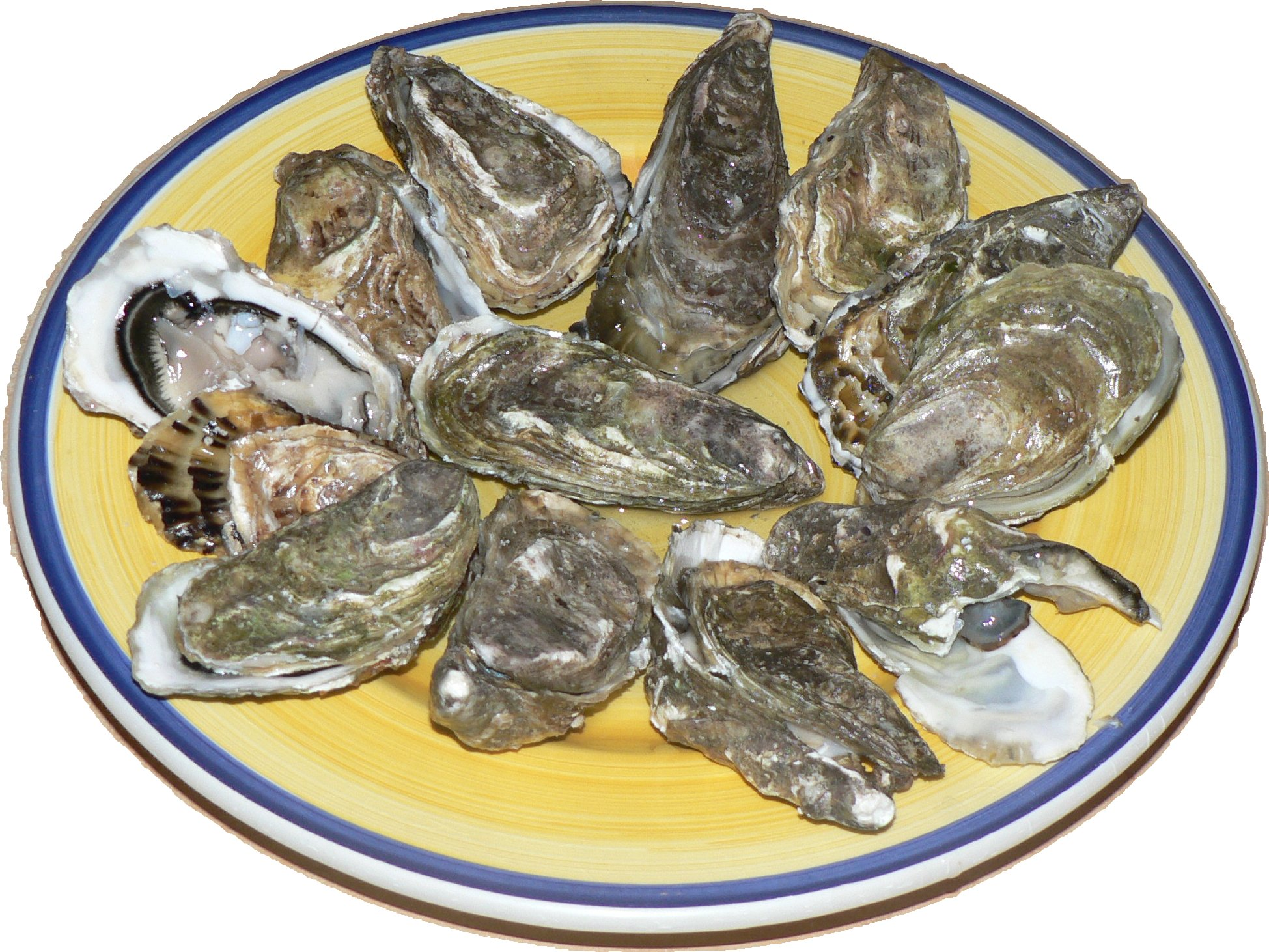
Raw oysters

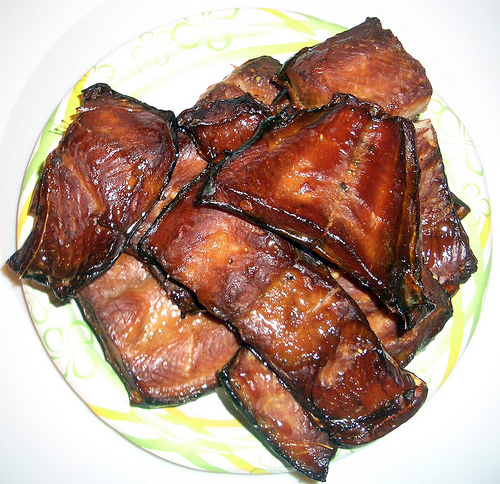
Smoked salmon

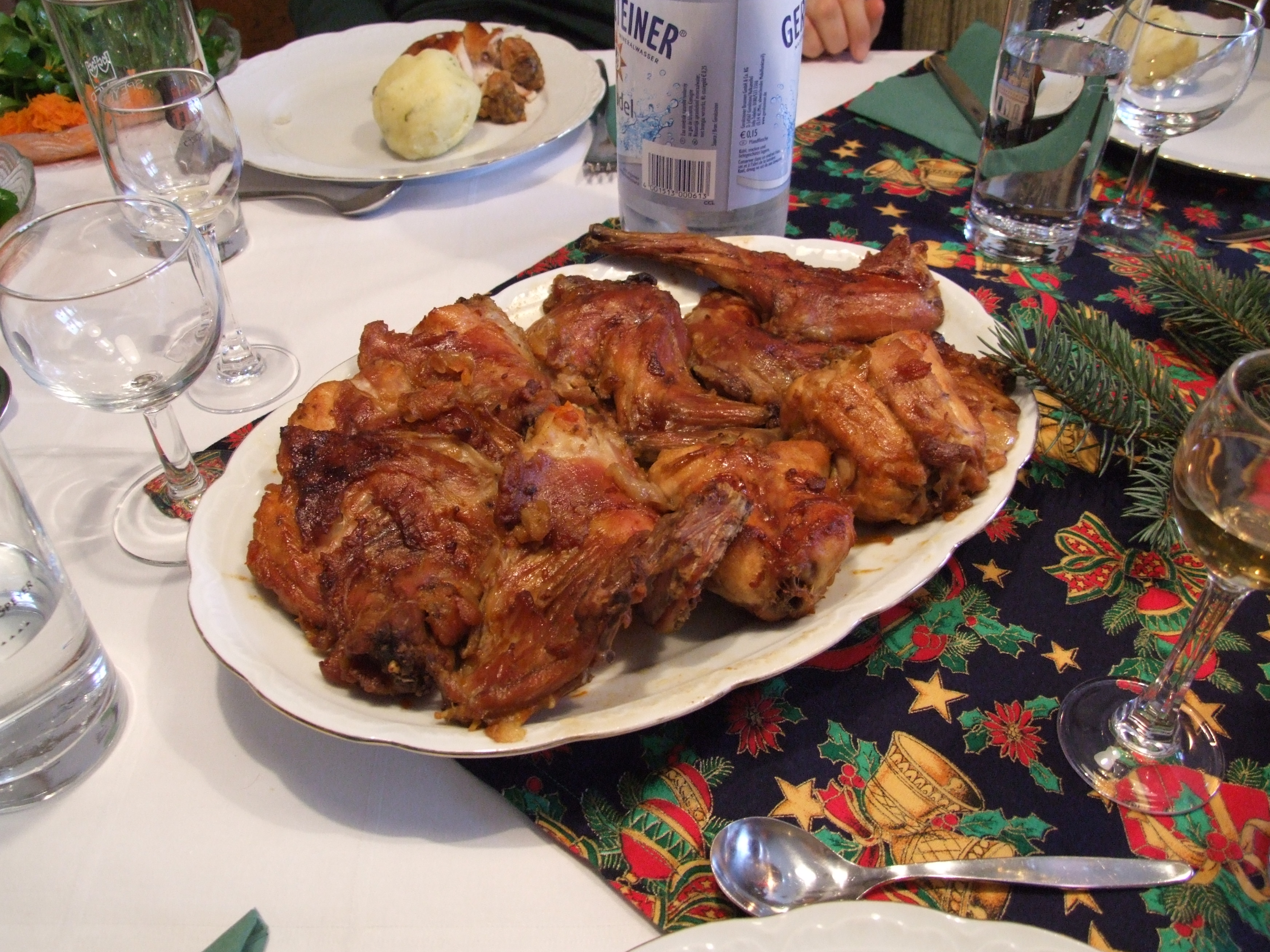
Roasted rabbit

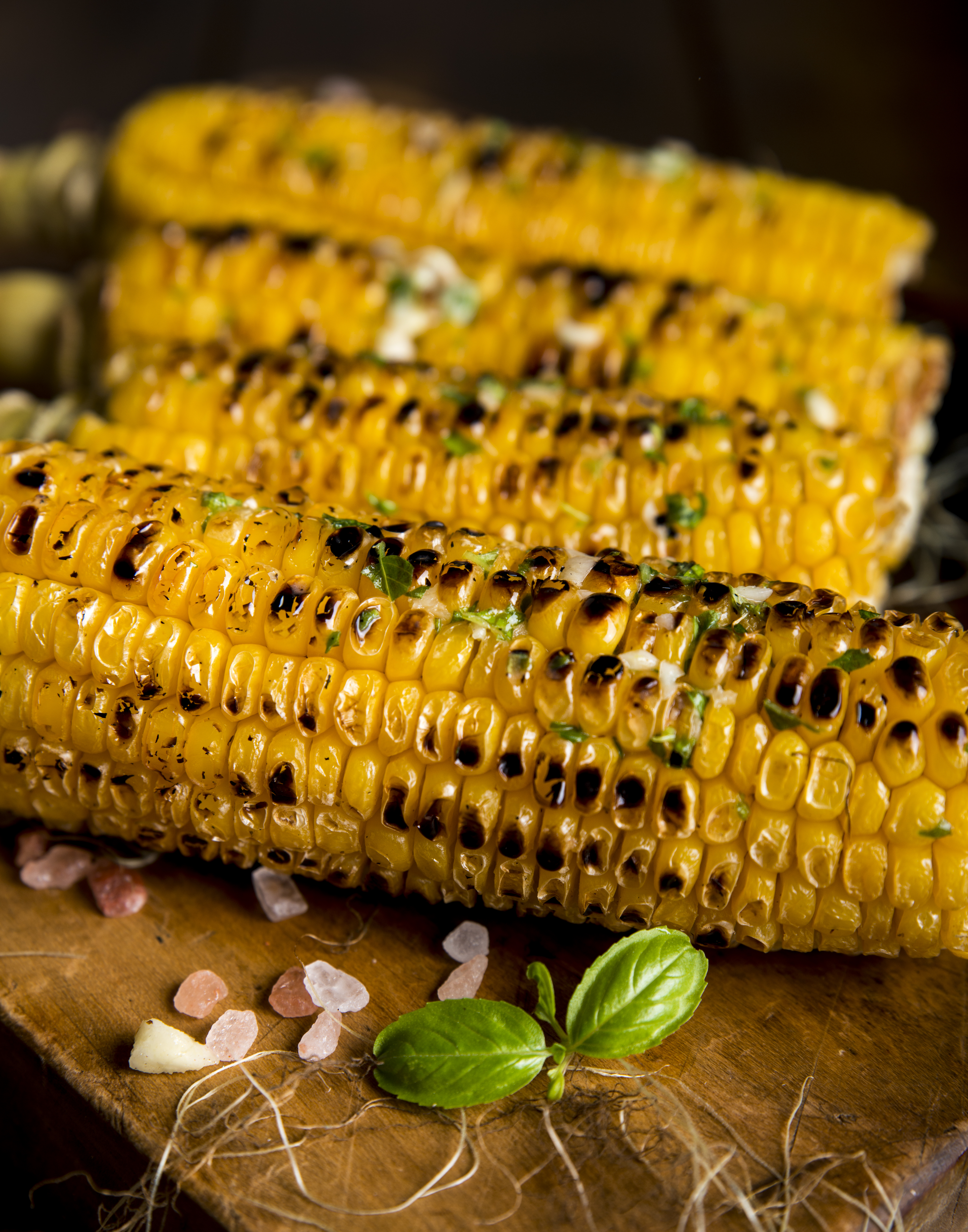
Roasted corn-on-the-cob

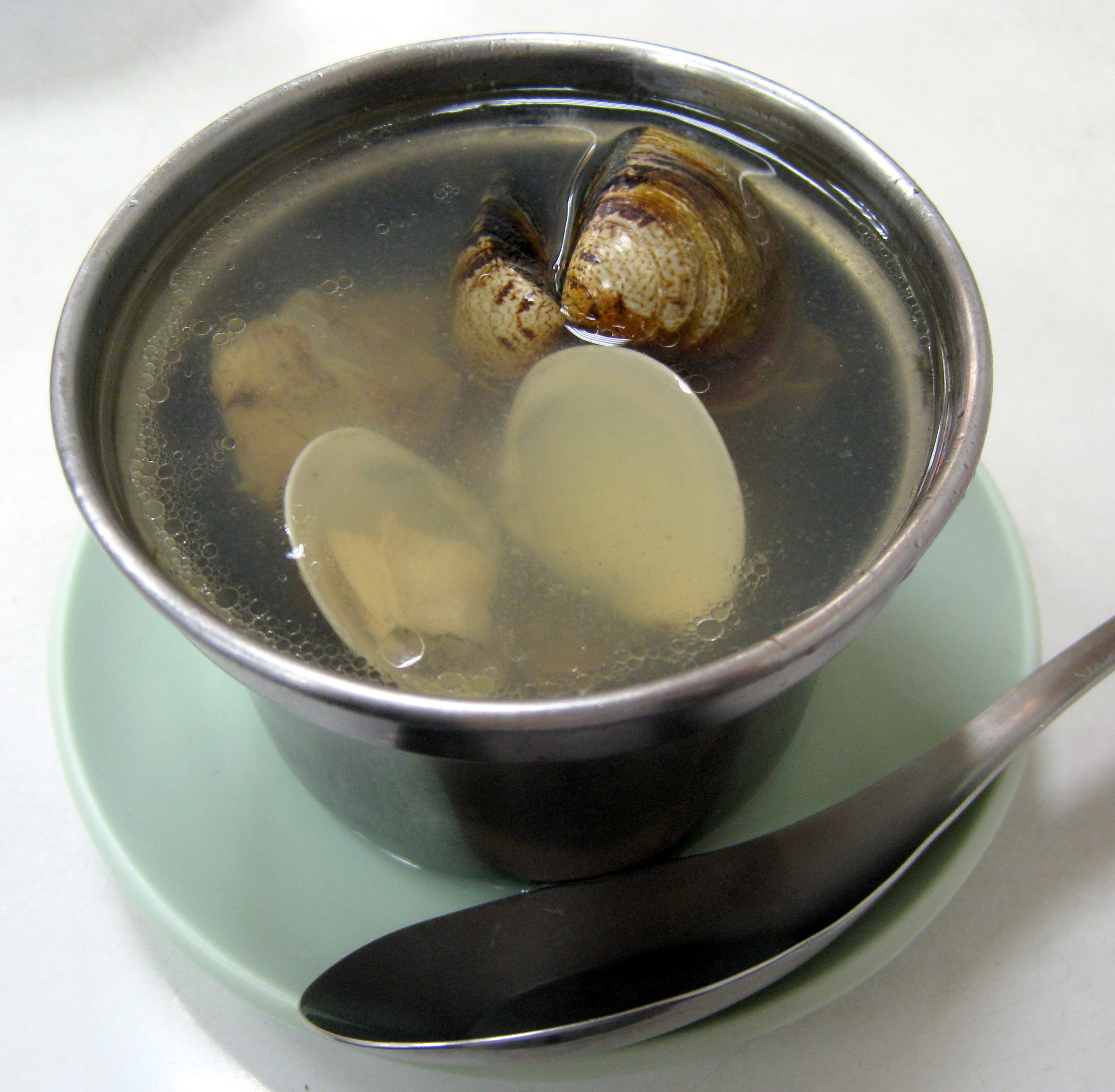
Clam soup

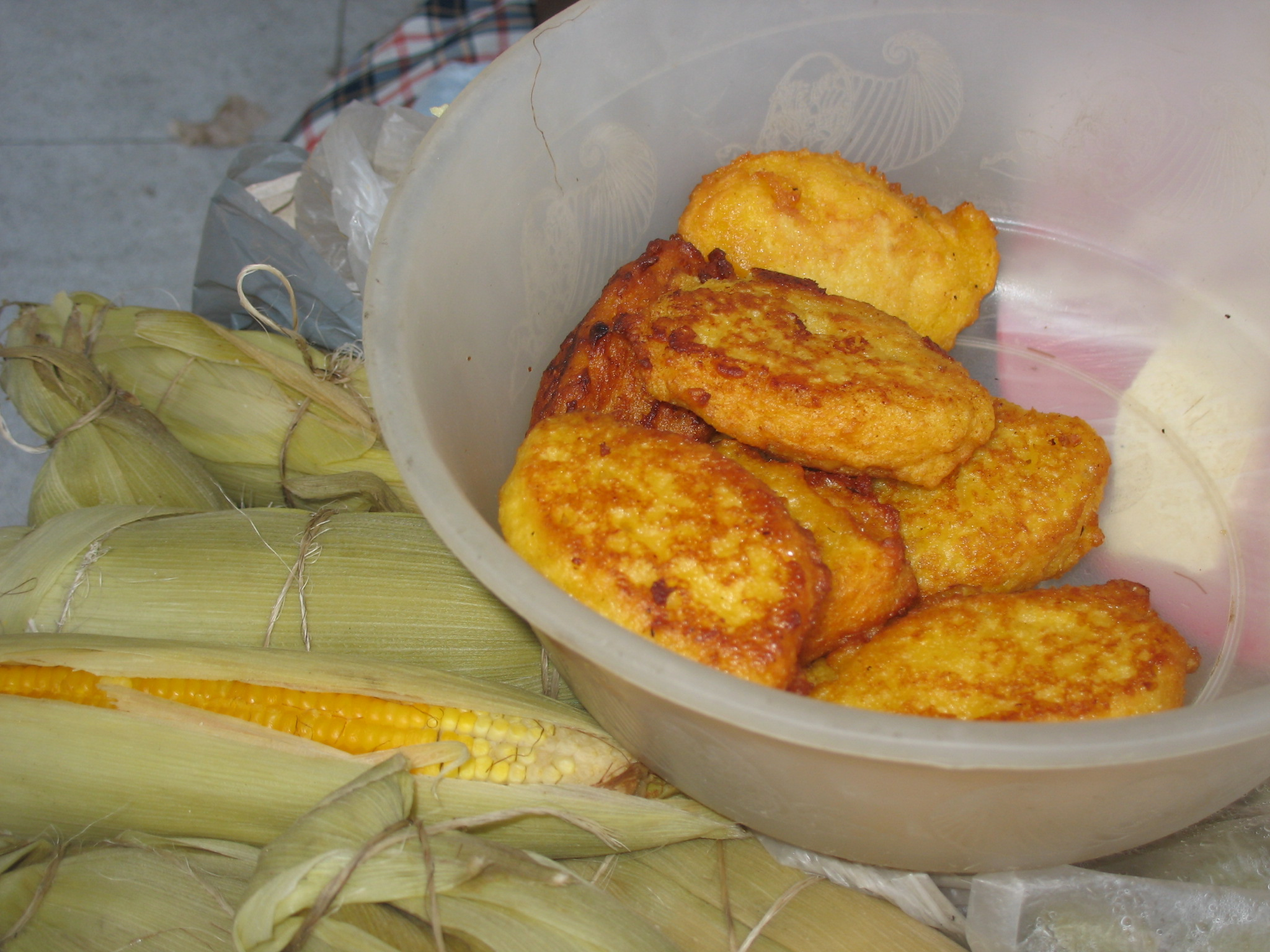
Corn fritters

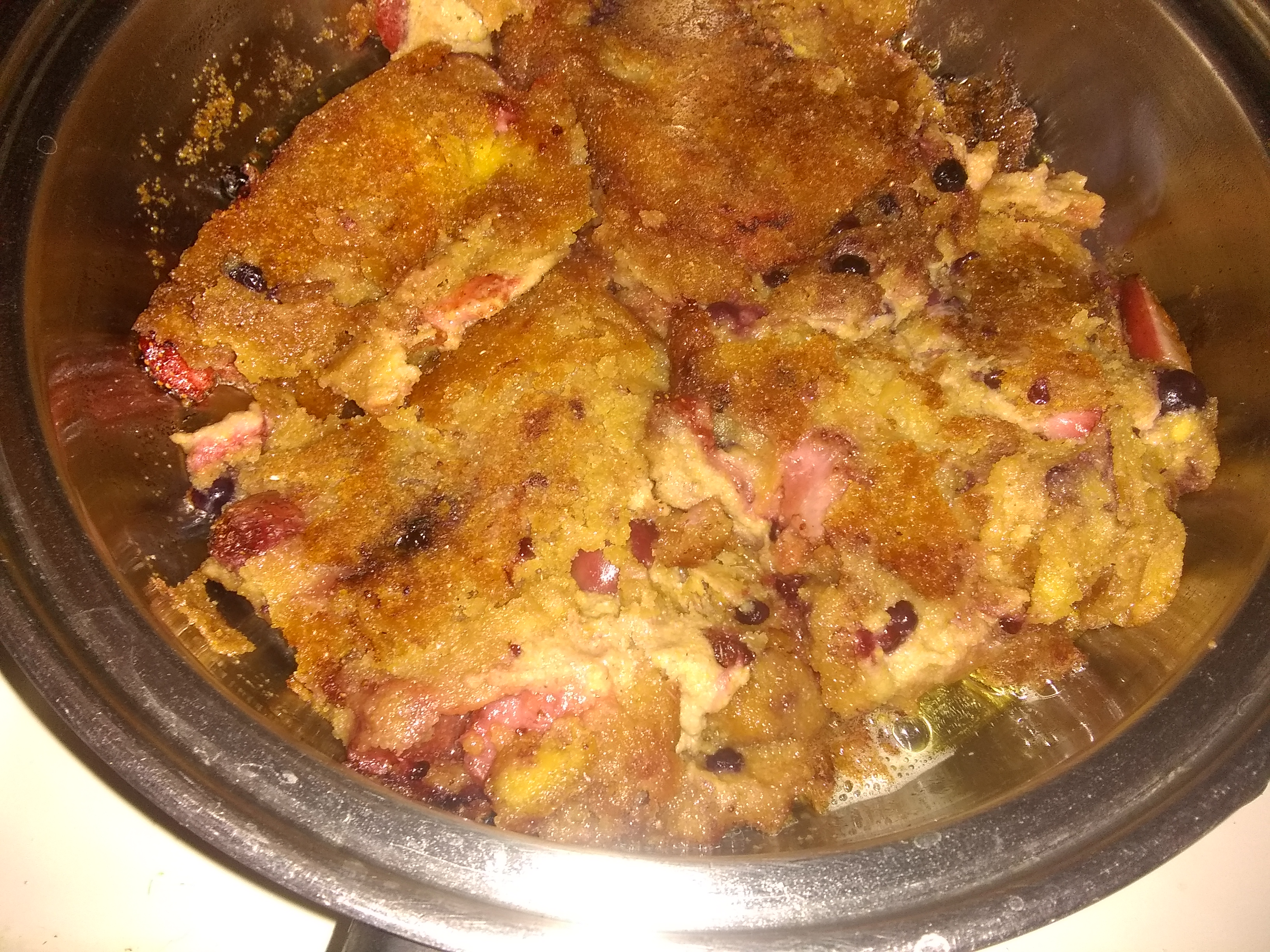
Indian berry bread

== Beverages ==
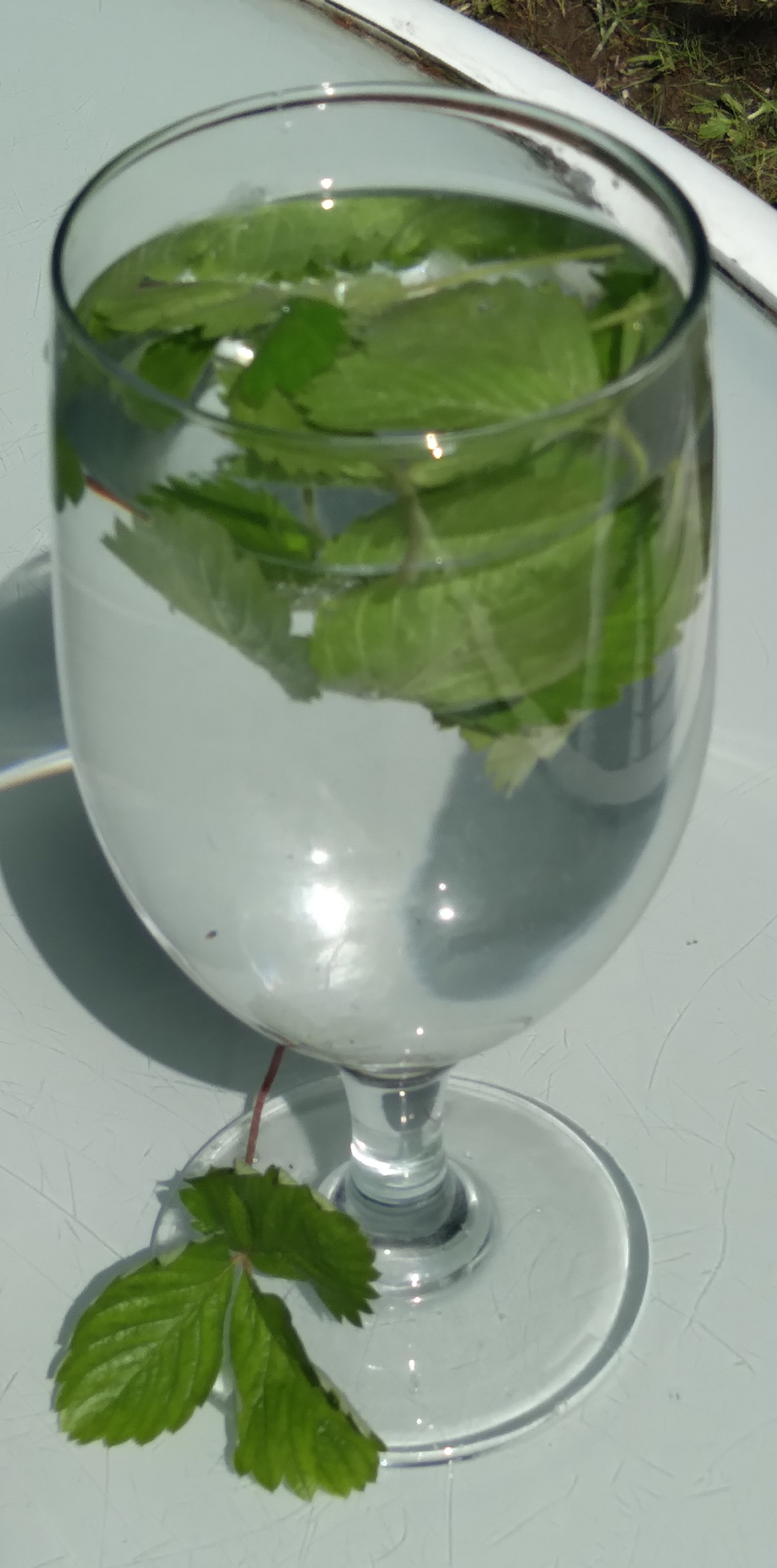
Strawberry leaf tea, made from fresh Fragaria vesca leaves

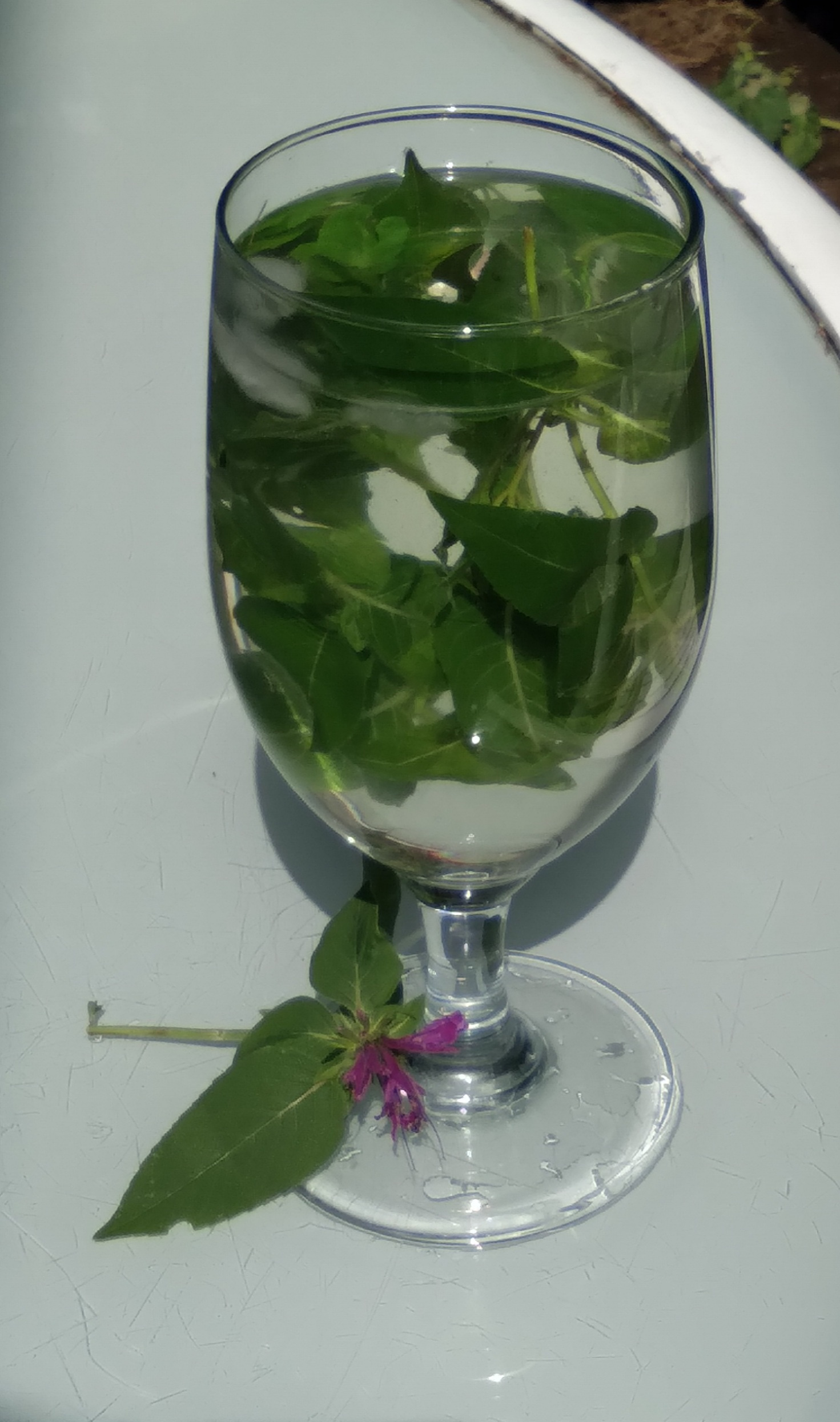
Oswego tea steeping, made from fresh Monarda didyma leaves

Water was the most common beverage, consumed hot or cold from gourds, bowls or ladled out or large clay vessels to collect and store water, and all Native settlements were always near an accessible source of water. In colder weather, water was heated in shallow clay vessels or soups were made extra runny to in order to provide warmth and needed hydration.

Juices of various fruits, squash and corn were occasionally consumed, but after water, flavored waters were the next most common source of refreshment. Water was simply flavored with blossoms, fruit, syrups or various herbs, often served hot like a tea.

- Elderflower tea, water boiled with elderflowers, served hot or cold.
- Indian lemonade, water flavored with sumac berries and sweetened with syrup.
- Nannyberry syrup tea, water flavored with nannyberry syrup produced from the blossoms or the berries.
- Oswego tea, water flavored with the leaves and flowers of bee balm, served hot or cold.
- Raspberry leaf tea, water boiled with dried raspberry leaves.
- Strawberry tea, water flavored with dried strawberries, served hot or cold.
- Strawberry leaf tea, water boiled with fresh or dried strawberry leaves.
- Walnut milk with squash, hot water mixed with powdered walnut and finely mashed squash, used as a substitute for breastmilk.
- Chestnut milk, same as walnut milk but made from chestnut, also served with mashed squash for similar use.
- Maple sugar drink, water sweetened and flavored with maple sugar.
- Fox grape juice, the pressed juice of fox grapes, watered down.
- Sassafras root tea, water boiled with sassafras roots, used medicinally.
- Green corn drink, sweet corn is mashed and pressed for its juice then mixed with water.
