= Extinct agricultural crops =

Formerly cultivated plants

Extinct agricultural crops, or lost crops, are crops that were once cultivated, but have become extinct over time, or have not been maintained in cultivation. This decline has been driven by modern farming practices, climate change, and shifts in consumer preferences. Preserving this agricultural heritage is essential for maintaining food diversity, supporting cultural traditions, and promoting food security in the face of global challenges.

== Examples of lost crops ==
=== Eastern North America ===
Before maize (corn) became the dominant crop, Native Americans in Eastern North America cultivated a variety of native crops for sustenance. This group of plants, known as the Eastern Agricultural Complex, included species such as erect knotweed (Polygonum erectum), goosefoot (Chenopodium berlandieri), sumpweed (Iva annua), maygrass (Phalaris caroliniana), and little barley (Hordeum pusillum). These crops were dietary staples for thousands of years. However, as maize farming became more widespread, the cultivation of these native crops declined and eventually faded from general agricultural practices.

=== Andean region ===
In the high mountains of South America, indigenous communities have long cultivated a variety of root crops alongside the well-known potato (Solanum tuberosum). Some of these lesser-known tubers include oca (Oxalis tuberosa), mashua (Tropaeolum tuberosum), and ulluco (Ullucus tuberosus). These root crops thrive in harsh mountain climates and have played a crucial role in the diets and cultures of Andean communities. However, factors such as colonial influence, intensive agriculture, and globalization have led to a decline in the cultivation of these traditional crops.

=== Africa ===
African lost crops include the native rice Oryza glaberrima and Ethiopian oats.

=== Kashmir ===
Kashmiri lost crops include the buckwheat species, Fagopyrum esculentum and Fagopyrum tataricum, and the minor millets, Setaria italica and Panicum miliaceum.

== Impact of industrial agriculture and monoculture ==
Industrial agriculture, which features massive mechanised farming operations, has revolutionised food production and consumption patterns. The growth of industrial farming systems pushed traditional farming diversity into marginalisation. The core element of industrial agriculture is monoculture which involves planting one crop across large agricultural areas. Monoculture makes it easier to plant and harvest crops and produces immediate financial profits. The trend of agricultural production toward fewer but larger farms has resulted in decreased crop diversity. The elimination of diverse plant species through monoculture production harms both pollinators and wildlife populations, which depend on these species for survival thus disrupting natural ecological systems.
