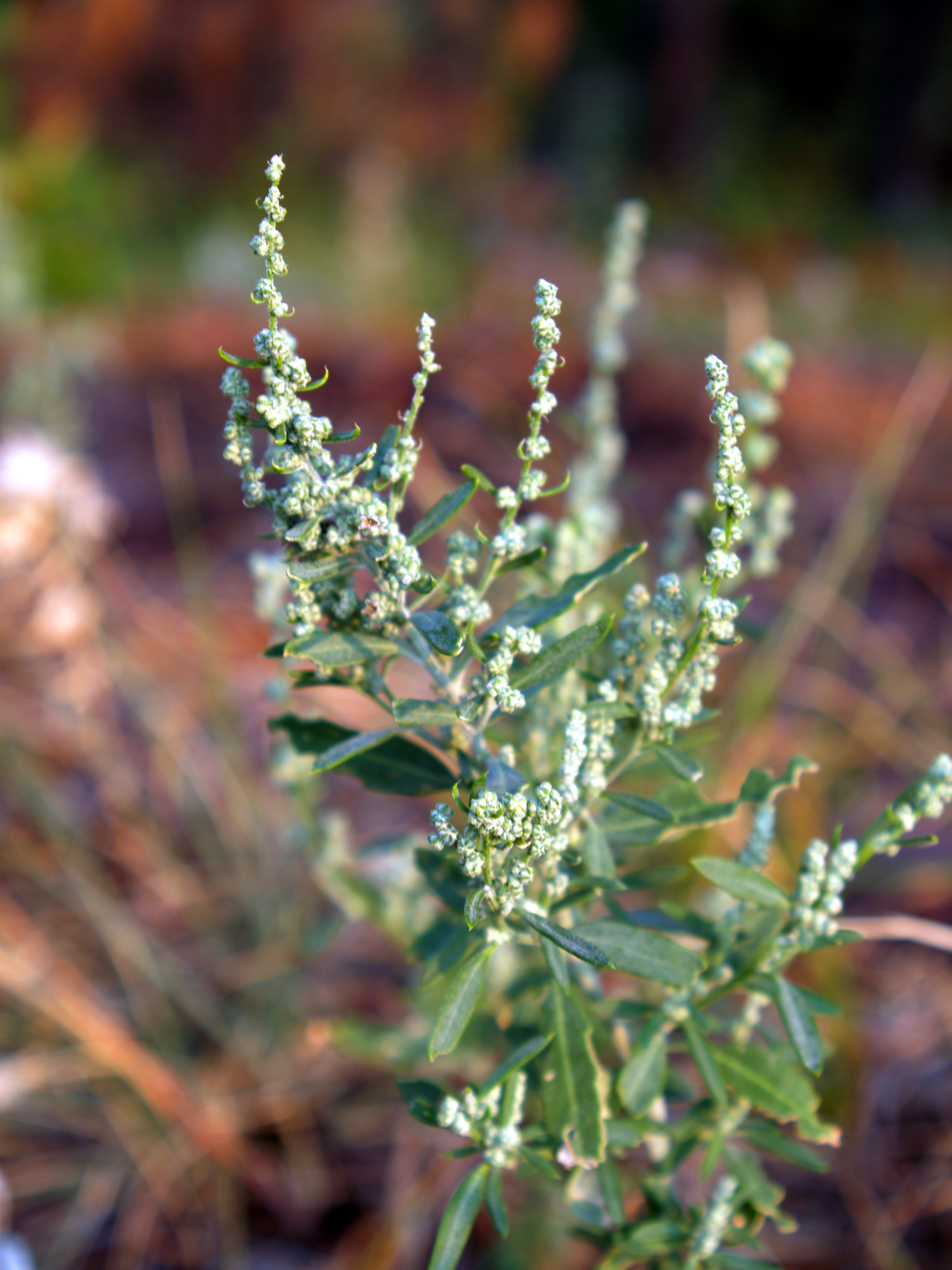

Conservation status
- Secure (NatureServe)

Scientific classification
- Kingdom: Plantae
- Clade: Tracheophytes
- Clade: Angiosperms
- Clade: Eudicots
- Order: Caryophyllales
- Family: Amaranthaceae
- Genus: Chenopodium
- Species: C. berlandieri

Binomial name
- Chenopodium berlandieri Moq.

= Chenopodium berlandieri =

Species of edible flowering plant

Chenopodium berlandieri, also known by the common names pitseed goosefoot, lamb's quarters (or lambsquarters), and huauzontle (Nahuatl), is an annual herbaceous plant in the family Amaranthaceae.

The species is widespread in North America, where its range extends from Canada south to Michoacán, Mexico. It is found in every U.S. state except Hawaii. The fast-growing, upright plant can reach heights of more than 3 m. It can be differentiated from most of the other members of its large genus by its honeycomb-pitted seeds, and further separated by its serrated, evenly lobed (more or less) lower leaves.

Although widely regarded as a weed, this species was once one of several plants cultivated by Native Americans in prehistoric North America as part of the Eastern Agricultural Complex. C. berlandieri was a domesticated pseudocereal crop, similar to the closely related quinoa C. quinoa. It continues to be cultivated in Mexico as a pseudocereal, as a leaf vegetable, and for its broccoli-like flowering shoots.

== Description ==
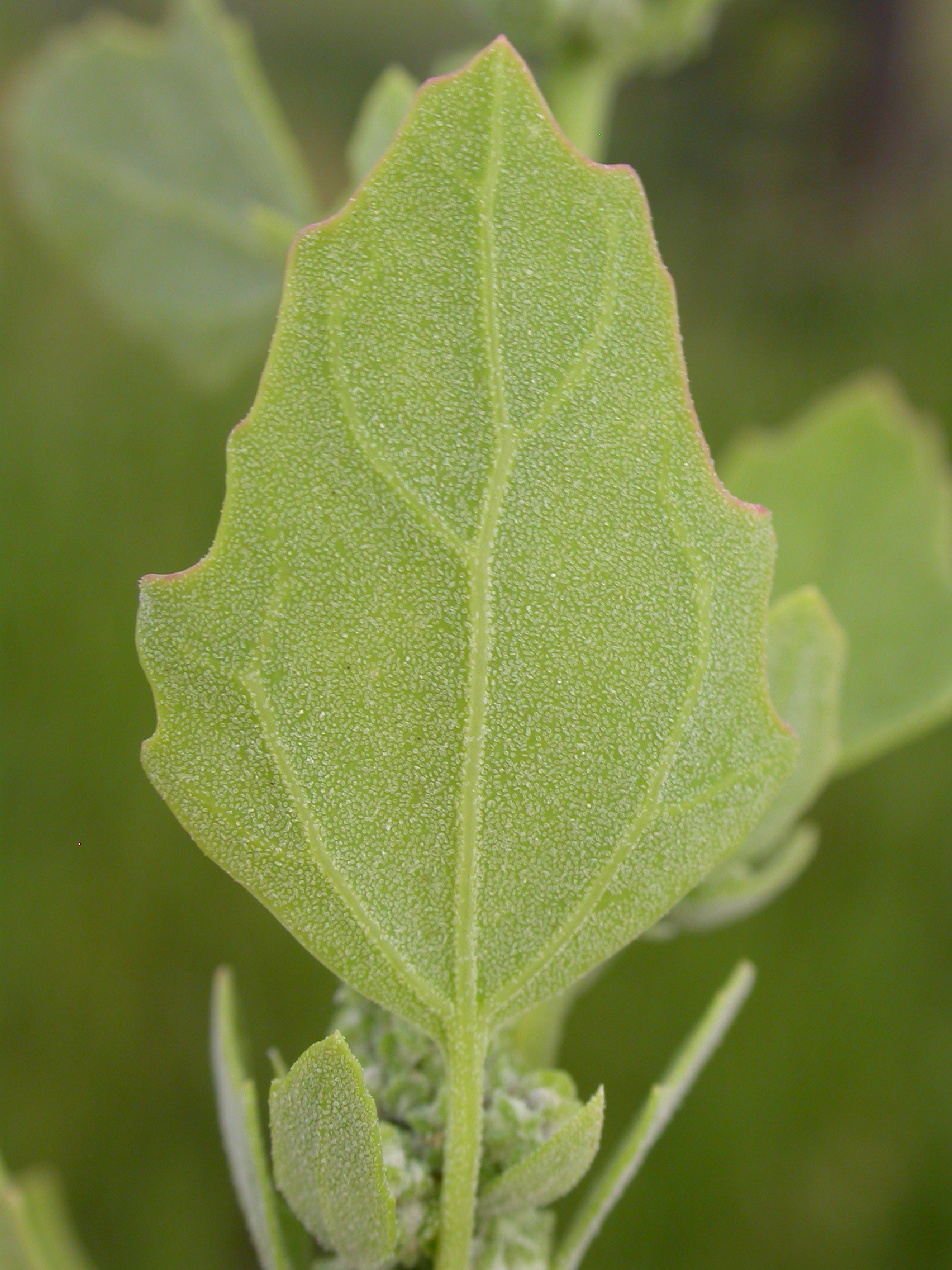
The leaf of C. berlandieri

=== Leaves and stems ===
The leaves are alternate, 13 to 152 millimetres (1/2 to 6 in) long and up to 89 millimetres (3 1/2 in) wide. The leaves are variable in shape: diamond to triangular to egg-shaped to lance-elliptic in outline. The tips may be pointed or blunt, while wedge-shaped or straight across at the base tapering to a stalk up to 89 millimetres (3 1/2 in) long. The lower leaves are largest, irregularly toothed, 1 1/2 to 2 or more times as long as wide and usually with a pair of shallow lobes near the base. Leaves become smaller and less toothy as they ascend the stem with the uppermost leaves often much narrower, proportionately longer and toothless.

Surfaces are green, hairless and moderately to densely white-mealy, especially when young. The upper surface usually becomes smooth, while the lower surface usually remains white-mealy. Stems are also highly variable: erect to ascending, unbranched to much branched and sparsely to densely white-mealy, especially on the upper stem. The stem color may vary from green to purple-striped to red.

=== Flowers ===
Very small flowers are tightly packed in small round clusters (glomerules) in spike-like and branching arrangements at the top of the stem, at the tips of branching stems and arising from upper leaf axils. The glomerules usually crowd on the branch. Within a glomerule, flowers may be at different stages of development: some just budding and others with maturing fruit. Flowers lack petals, have 5 stamens and a round, green ovary with a 2-parted style at the tip that is not divided all the way to the base. Cupping the flower is a green calyx with 5 lobes 0.5 to 1.5 mm long and variable shape: triangular or egg-shaped, strongly keeled, blunt to rounded at the tip and thin and papery around the edges. Bracts are leaf-like or sometimes absent. The calyx, stalks and branches are moderately to densely white-mealy.

=== Seeds ===
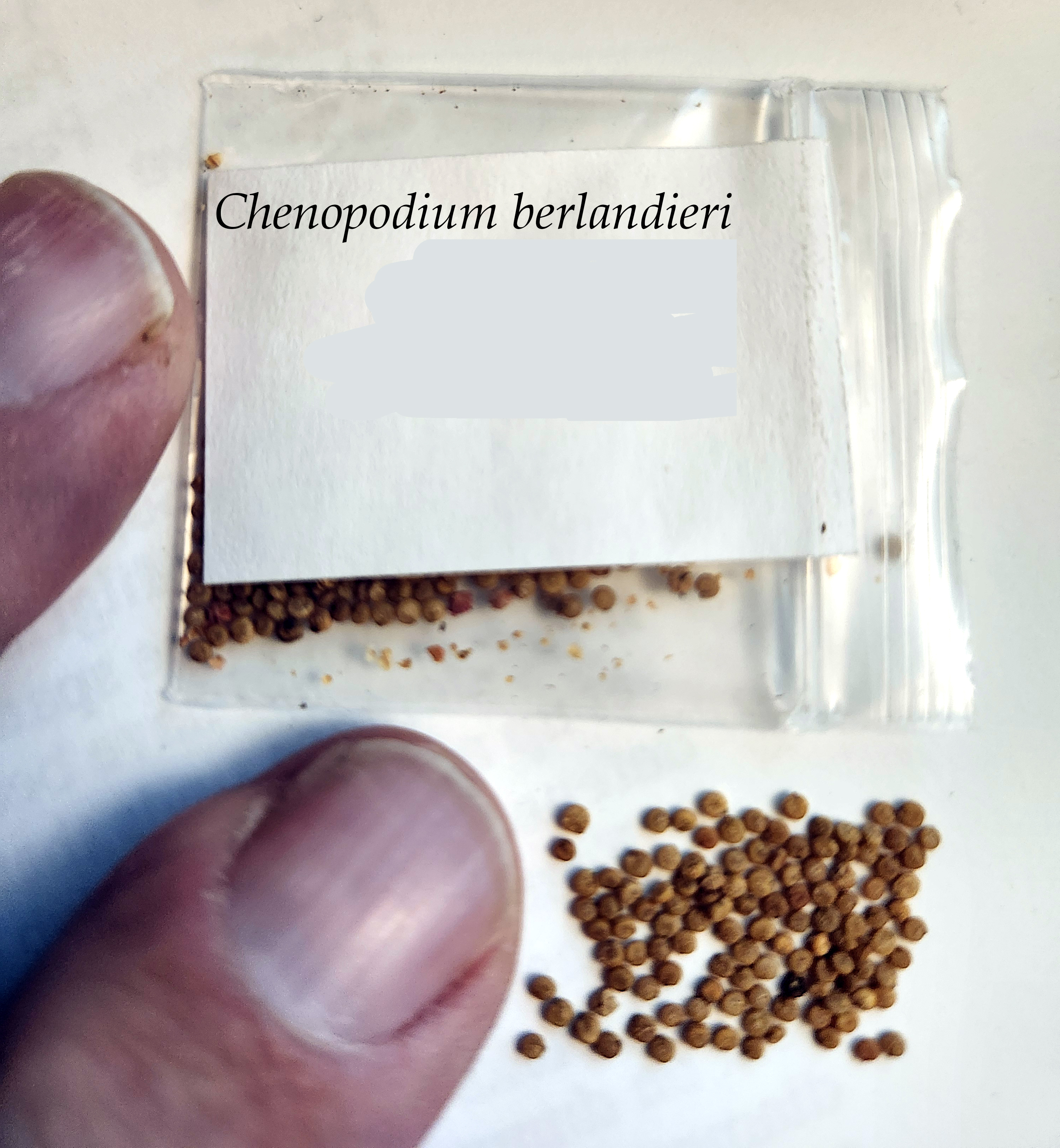
Chenopodium berlandieri seeds

Chenopodium seeds vary in shape between lenticular and cylindrical. The lenticular shape is more typical of wild members of the species while cylindrical seeds (said to have a "truncated margin") predominate in domesticated varieties.

The nutritive perisperm tissue is encircled by the embryo along the seed margin. The radicle protrudes slightly, producing a visible bump in the circumference of the seed (called the "beak"). Surrounding the perisperm and embryo are three layers: the inner epiderm, the outer epiderm, and the pericarp. The inner epiderm is also called a tegmen. The outer epiderm is synonymous with testa. Together, the outer and inner epiderm make up the seed coat. In Chenopodium literature, the terms outer epiderm, testa, and seed coat are often used interchangeably.

The pericarp is often dehiscent, but is non-dehiscent in some varieties. In domesticated varieties, the seed coat may be reduced or absent. Uniform seed assemblages with seed coats less than 20 μm thick are considered to represent domesticated population. Conversely, wild populations tend to produce seeds with seed coat thicker than 20 μm.

== Taxonomy ==
The species includes two subspecies: the type subspecies (i.e. C. b. ssp. berlandieri) and C. b. ssp. nuttalliae. The latter, which also goes by the common names huauzontle, huauthili and Nuttall's goosefoot, is a domesticated variety cultivated in Mexico.

As many as six extant varieties of C. b. ssp. berlandieri have been identified:

- C. b. subsp. berlandieri var. berlandieri
- C. b. subsp. berlandieri var. boscianum
- C. b. subsp. berlandieri var. bushianum (Bush's goosefoot)
- C. b. subsp. berlandieri var. macrocalycium
- C. b. subsp. berlandieri var. sinuatum
- C. b. subsp. berlandieri var. zschackii (Zschack's goosefoot)

The extinct variety is well-documented, though it may represent more than one taxon:

- C. b. subsp. jonesianum

Additionally, the cultivars of the C. b. nuttalliae subspecies are:

- 'Huauzontle' - This cultivar is a more recent selection used in commercial cultivation for a broccoli-like crop. It is a "naked" variety and has a testa only 2-7 μm thick (cf. human hair, which is about 100 μm wide).
- 'Chia' - Grown as a grain crop, this cultivar is declining and is cultivated only on a local level. It also has a very thin testa, though slightly thicker than the previous at 10-20 μm.
- 'Quelite' - This cultivar is cultivated for its spinach-like leaves.

The species is capable of hybridizing with the related introduced European Chenopodium album, which it resembles, giving the hybrid C. × variabile Aellen.

== Domestication ==
C. berlandieri is the progenitor of all domesticated Chenopodium varieties in North and South America. In prehistoric eastern North America it was a part of the Eastern Agricultural Complex, a set of cultivated and domesticated species which supported sedentary and migrant populations for thousands of years. Archaeological evidence shows the species was extensively foraged as a wild plant in eastern North America as early as 6,500 BC. By 1700 BC, the plant had clearly been domesticated as a pseudocereal crop. The name given to the domesticated variety is C. b. ssp. jonesianum. The oldest evidence for domestication comes from caches of thin-testa seeds from rock shelters in the Ozark Plateaus and Ohio River basin. The only known potential historic record of C. b. ssp. jonesianum is a ca. 1720 account by Antoine Simon Le Page du Pratz. According to Le Page, the Natchez people cultivated a grain-like crop called Choupichoul that was delicious, nutritious, highly productive, and required minimal human labor. Multiple lines of evidence suggest that the crop was a domesticated variety of C. berlandieri.

Chenopodium berlandieri was cultivated alongside three other starchy, seed-bearing plants, namely maygrass, little barley and knotweed, providing an important nutritional basis for indigenous groups at the time. Around approximately 1600 BC, another annual starchy seed crop, maize, appeared in the Eastern Woodlands. Maize would later on come to dominate much of North American agriculture, but for about 3000 years, maize formed only a minor component of garden or field plots. By approximately 1150 AD, maize became a major dietary constituent of prehistoric populations in the Eastern Woodlands. This led to a substantial decrease in Chenopodium berlandieri cultivation. Nonetheless, pitseed goosefoot remained important up until the point of European contact, after which it virtually disappeared.

Indigenous people used pitseed goosefoot not only for subsistence, but also for medicinal and preservative reasons. Chenopodium berlandieri prevents intestinal parasites and has the capacity of preserving foods. These qualities may explain why indigenous people kept cultivating Chenopodium berlandieri despite the large effort of harvesting its minuscule seeds. It is the raw leaves that were used medicinally, rather than the seeds.

Although cultivation disappeared in eastern North America, C. b. subsp. nuttalliae continues to be cultivated as a domesticated crop in Mexico. Three varieties of the subspecies are grown as a pseudocereal, as a leaf vegetable, and for its broccoli-like flowering shoots, respectively.

The principal difference between wild and domesticated forms of Chenopodium is the thickness of the seed coat. In the domesticated varieties, due to selective pressures during domestication, the testas are less than 20 microns thick; the testas of wild chenopods are 40 to 60 microns thick. This morphological characteristic is shared by the modern cultivated chenopod C. b. subsp. nuttalliae and the archaeological specimens of C. b. ssp. jonesianum. Genetic studies have shown that eastern North American and Mexican cultivated forms have considerable genetic distance between them. Despite the initial assumption of a single domestication event, consensus in the field now supports at least two independent domestication events in North America. Similarly, C. berlandieri's South American branch likely experienced at least two independent domestication events, both of which are called C. quinoa.

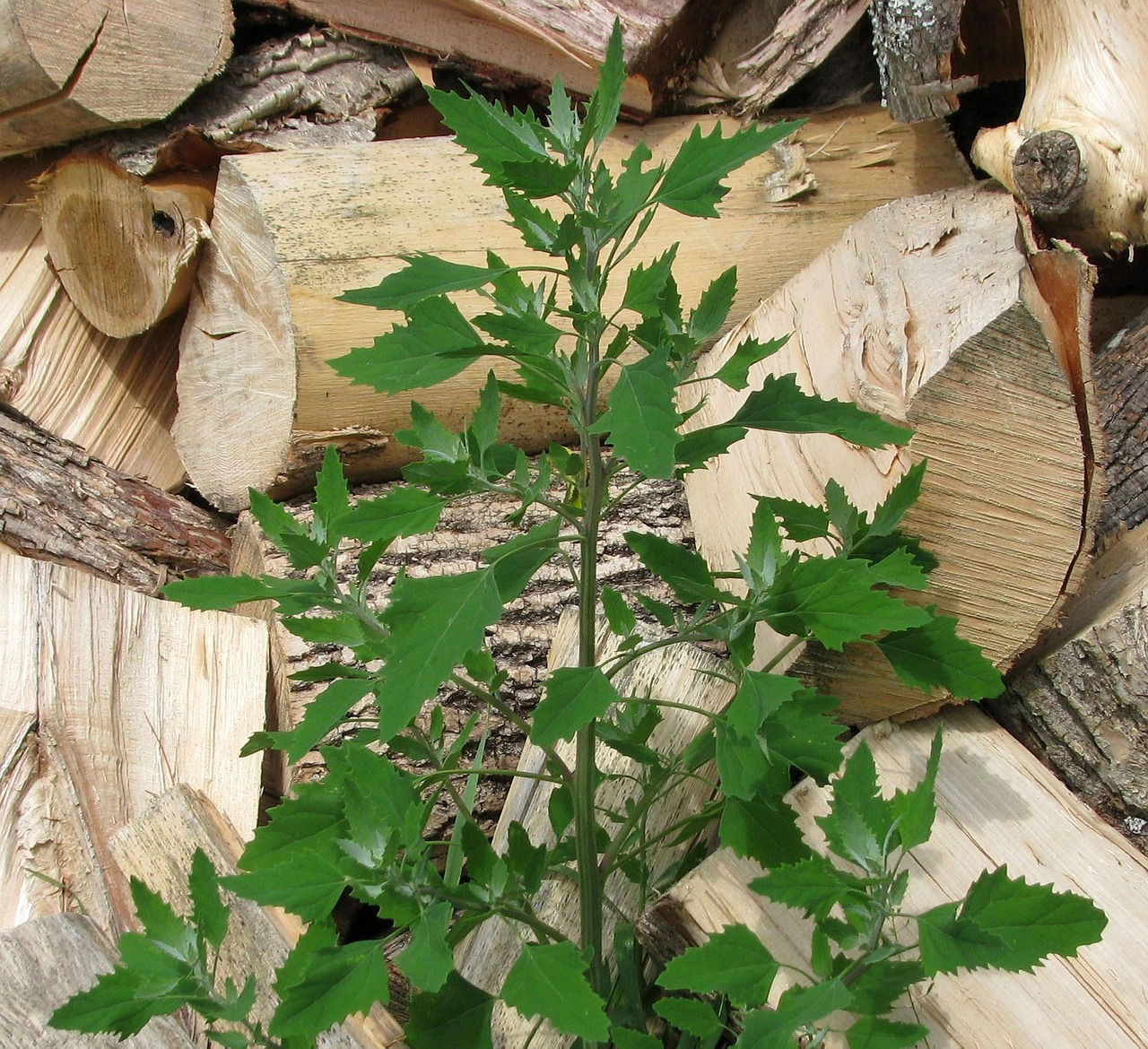
Chenopodium berlandieri growing near a pile of wood in Ontario, Canada.

== Weed status ==
Members of the Chenopodium species have been implicated among the greatest weed threats to agriculture in North America and globally. This success can be attributed to their ability to survive across a range of environmental conditions due to a high reproductive capacity, variation in their dormancy and germination requirements, and abiotic stress tolerance.

Importantly, the Amaranthaceae family is one of five weed families (along with Poaceae, Asteraceae, Brassicaceae, and Chenopodiaceae) that represent only 50% of the world's principal weeds but account for approximately 70% of all cases of herbicide resistance. Most research identifies European species C. album as a prime candidate for resistance to multiple herbicides, in particular to triazines and glyphosates. The weed status and herbicide tolerance of C. berlandieri is less researched and less clear due to its many wild and semi-domesticated forms resulting from frequent hybridization and polyploidy.

The spread and sporadic domestication of C. berlandieri across eastern North and Central America has resulted in a complex network of domesticated and wild sub-species known to co-exist and interact in shared ecosystems. Human paleofeces collected from Salts Cave in Kentucky and Big Bone Cave in Tennessee were found to contain both seeds from weed and crop forms of the plant seemingly consumed within hours of each other, suggesting close spatial proximity and a potential for hybridization between populations.

Morphological studies identified that seeds from weedy varieties of C. berlandieri tend to have a thicker testa (seed coat), a more rounded or biconvex margin configuration, more prominent testa patterning, a less developed beak, and a smaller overall size when compared to their domesticated counterparts. However, intermediate morphologies were also identified, indicating genetic interaction (crossing over) between these groups.

This cross-compatibility and hybridization leads to the formation of crop-weed complexes, between C. berlandieri plants as well as with other members of the Chenopodium species. For example, following the spread of C. quinoa across North America as a novel crop, one study found that up to 30% of wild C. berlandieri grown along the periphery of quinoa fields were crop/weed hybrids. Gene flow was observed to be asymmetric (from crop to weed), due to a preferential flow of pollen from high-density populations of domesticated C. quinoa to dispersed populations of wild C. berlandieri. This directional crop-weed interaction has implications for the future of introgressive change in wild C. berlandieri varieties. While genetic introgression is often degenerative for both crops and wild plants, it may also promote greater biodiversity in conventional cropping systems and present research opportunities for new crop varieties.

== Cultivation ==
=== Climate & soil requirements ===
Chenopodium berlandieri is an extremely versatile plant; it can handle a variety of elevations, commonly found growing at sea level and at 10,000 feet (3,000 m) elevation, such as in the San Juan mountains of Colorado. In the Andes of South America, there are varieties of lambsquarter that grow at over 12,000 feet (3,700 m). It is very cold hardy and therefore one of the later weeds to be killed by frost. It dislikes shade. When exposed to full sun conditions, the plants tend to be robust with many lateral branches producing high quantities of seed. Plants growing in shaded conditions tend to be more gracile, taller, with fewer lateral branches and produce less seed.

Chenopodium berlandieri thrives in many types of soil with varying pH levels. When the soil is fertile, it will grow large and full in size and form very attractive stands of vegetation. The presence of a stand of healthy lambsquarter is one of the best indicators for vital soil. However, it can also handle the worst of soils and has been known to even survive in disturbed soils such as annual vegetable gardens, neglected fields and coal-pit heaps. Like its close relatives, it can serve as a cover crop and natural fertilizer because of its dense nutrient content.

=== Sowing ===
C. Berlandieri is a self-seeding annual plant. It grows easily from seed and does not require orderly cultivation. The seeds themselves can stay dormant for many years and take root when the conditions are ideal. The species is hermaphroditic, having both male and female organs on the same plant, which are wind-pollinated. It is known to cross-pollinate with Chenopodium album to create a hybrid. The plant is in flower from July to October, with green-hued flowers. From August to October, the seeds ripen.

=== Harvesting ===
C. berlandieri is an elusive subject for harvest yield experiments; the floodplain weeds with their minuscule seeds are difficult to harvest relative to other species. High costs are associated with its harvesting due to the minute size and oiliness of seeds. Although occurring in vast numbers, seed size makes collecting enough for daily or long-term subsistence needs of an individual or group challenging. The relative cost of procurement and processing in quantities sufficient for a meal has been a limiting factor in their use throughout history and domestication has had little impact on reducing overall handling costs.

=== Yield ===
The yield of pitseed goosefoot can vary substantially due to the differences in amount of sunlight received by the plants. Moreover, competition with surrounding plants can also influence how much yield is obtained. Studies have recorded yields between 276 and 2854 kg/ha and estimate that the harvest yield of goosefoot in prehistoric times must have been around 750–1500 kg/ha. A yield above 1000 kg/ha must have been necessary to justify its use compared to maize. Additionally, the harvest rate of pitseed goosefoot is 1 kg/hour.

== Nutrition ==
As with other Amaranthaceae species, C. berlandieri is rich in macronutrients of proteins, carbohydrates and fats, as well as micronutrients including vitamins and minerals. Its high nutritional quality has given rise to researching its use for food security in rural populations.

The leaf nutritional content, expressed per 100 g of fresh weight: 0.2 kJ Fat, 3.45 kJ Protein, 3.17 kJ total dietary fiber (primarily insoluble fiber; 8.3% to 12.8% of the recommended daily intake), 111.8 kJ energy, 2.21 kJ available carbohydrates. The leaves are sources of phytochemicals and nutritional compounds. They have shown significant contents of protein, inorganic nutrients of Calcium (Ca), Iron (Fe) and Magnesium (Mg). It also has a high percentage of oleic, linoleic and linolenic acids, which are essential for human nutrition, and highest total flavonoids index (TFI) when compared to other Amaranthacae species.

The plant is a good source of fiber and has high flavonoids concentration, such as quercetin and kaempferol, which have high antioxidant potential. Leaves have been analyzed to contain higher chlorophyll content compared to other Amaranthacae species, which is nutritionally relevant, as it has been reported to reduce reactive oxygen species.

The seeds are gluten free. Like other quinoa and amaranth species, proteins in the seeds are of particularly high nutritional value due to high concentration of essential amino acids. Safety concerns have been raised around saponins, which are toxic, though mostly to fish. In the plant, the saponin quantity is too small to harm humans. Studies have shown that some saponins may form insoluble complexes with minerals, such as zinc and iron, thus negatively affecting absorption and bioavailability of nutrients in the gut. Saponins are bitter, but break down during the cooking process, rendering them harmless and allowing nutrients to be bioavailable to humans. Cooking also reduces the oxalic acid content, which may also raise concerns.

== Uses ==
Chenopodium berlandieri has little presence in the current world food system, especially compared to other plants within its genus, such as Chenopodium quinoa or C. ambrosioides. This may be due to a recent Western bias against weedy plants, as well as a manifestation of colonial history which led to a disconnect from the local environment and indigenous knowledge.

Today, the plant is still used as an edible herb and vegetable, primarily in Mexico. Edible parts of the plant include leaves, young shoots and seeds. Like other leafy greens, the leaves and shoots are eaten raw or cooked, though raw leaves are bitter as they contain chemical compounds produced by the plant for defense mechanisms.

The plant can be processed through mechanical and chemical techniques. Mechanical processing techniques include winnowing to remove non-nutritive components, including possibly toasting the seeds during the winnowing process, followed by milling to de-husk the plant and separate the seeds.

The seeds can then be ground down into smaller particles to make grits or bulgur, or ground further into flours to be combined with cereal flours to make breads or pancakes.

The seeds contain saponins, though in small quantities, which are removed by soaking seeds in water overnight and rinsing thoroughly before further processing. Another method involves chemical processing, whereby gradual, controlled heating of the seeds detoxifies them, allowing nutrients to be bioavailable for digestion. People with gout, arthritis, rheumatism, kidney stones, or hyperacidity should use caution when consuming the plant, as it may aggravate their condition.

=== Medicinal potential ===
Chenopodium berlandieri is a prime candidate for additional research, especially its prospects for utility in the medicinal model. Long-term use of this plant makes little sense when judged in strict terms of subsistence. C. berlandieri shares some qualities with its medicinally useful relatives such as Chenopodium ambrosioides which is a widely known vermifuge and a potential food preservative. This makes its potential medicinal value a possibility. Its chemical constituents and possible medicinal properties have only been briefly examined in the anthropological and botanical literature. The useful substances in the leaves avoid the problems associated with the inefficiency of harvesting and processing the seeds. Tests for and analyses of bioactive chemical compounds would likely resolve questions about the use of Chenopodium berlandieri and the medicinal use may be evident in the concentration of these compounds.

== See also ==
- Jean-Louis Berlandier
- Iva annua
- Polygonum erectum
- Hordeum pusillum
- Phalaris caroliniana
- Helianthus
- Cucurbita pepo
