= New World crops =

Crops native to the New World

Montage of New World domesticated plants

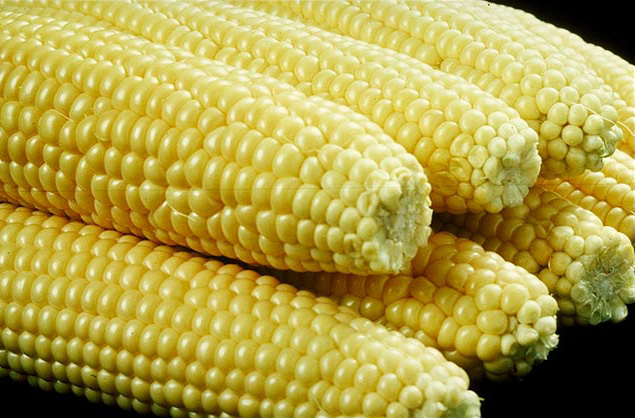
Maize

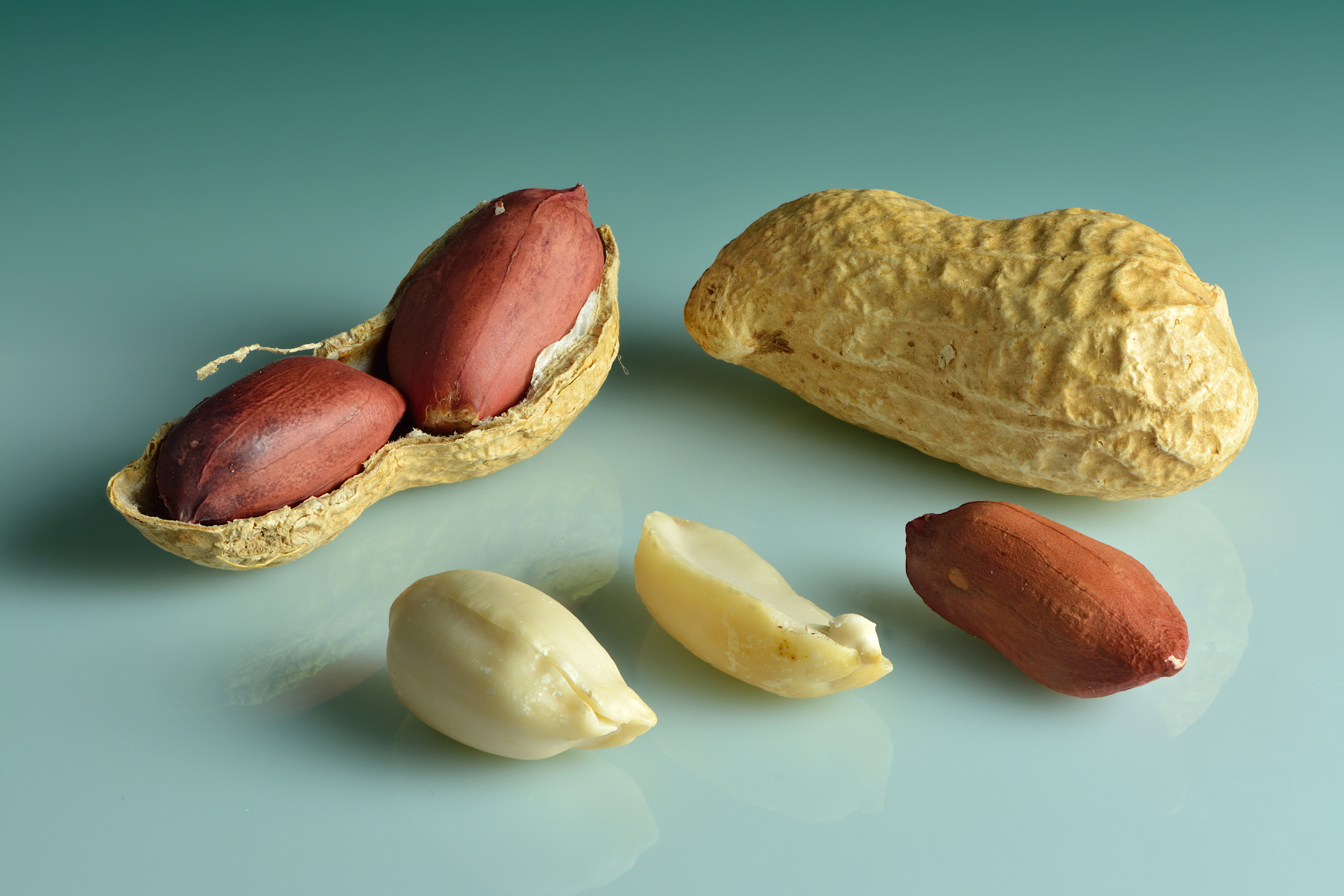
Peanuts

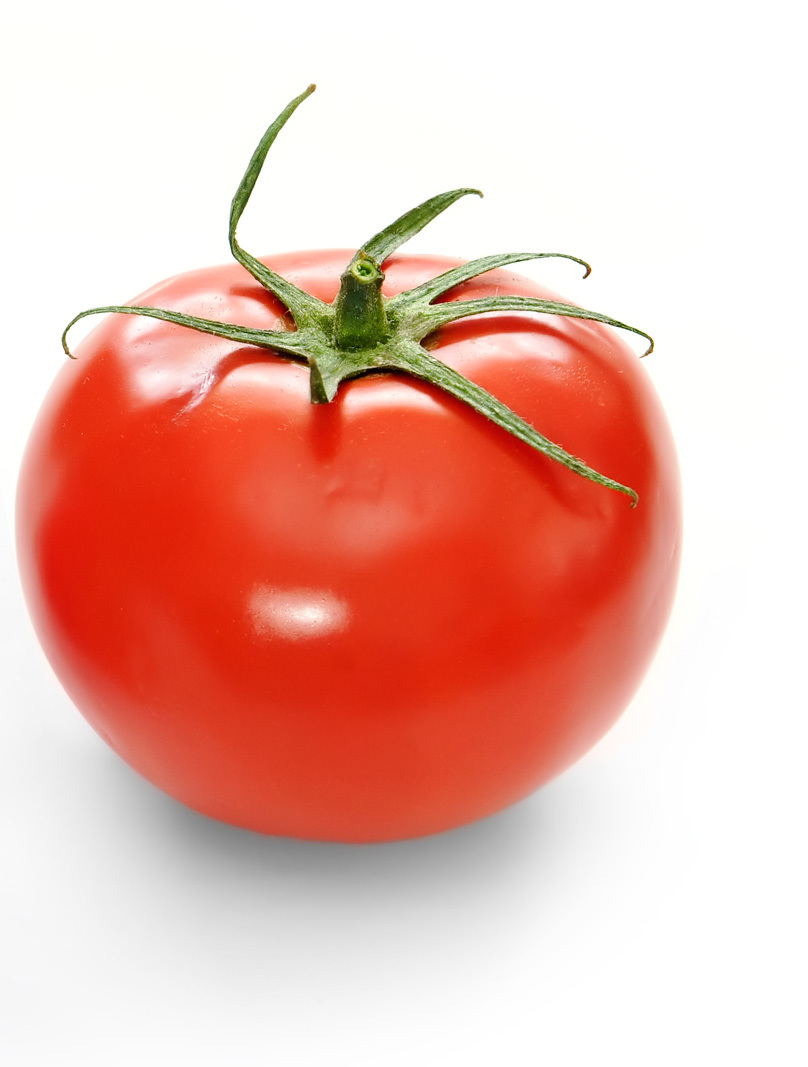
Tomatoes

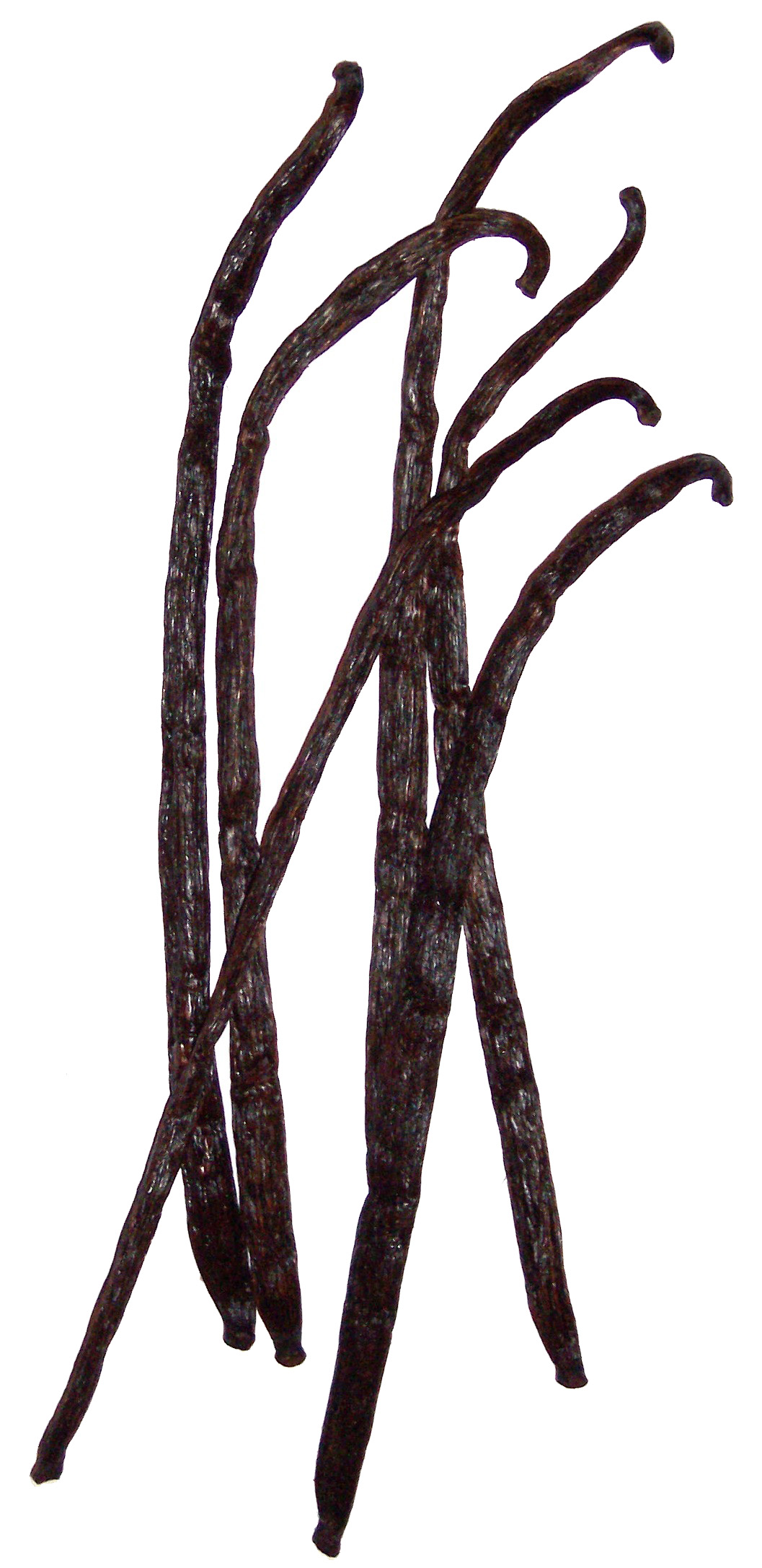
Vanilla

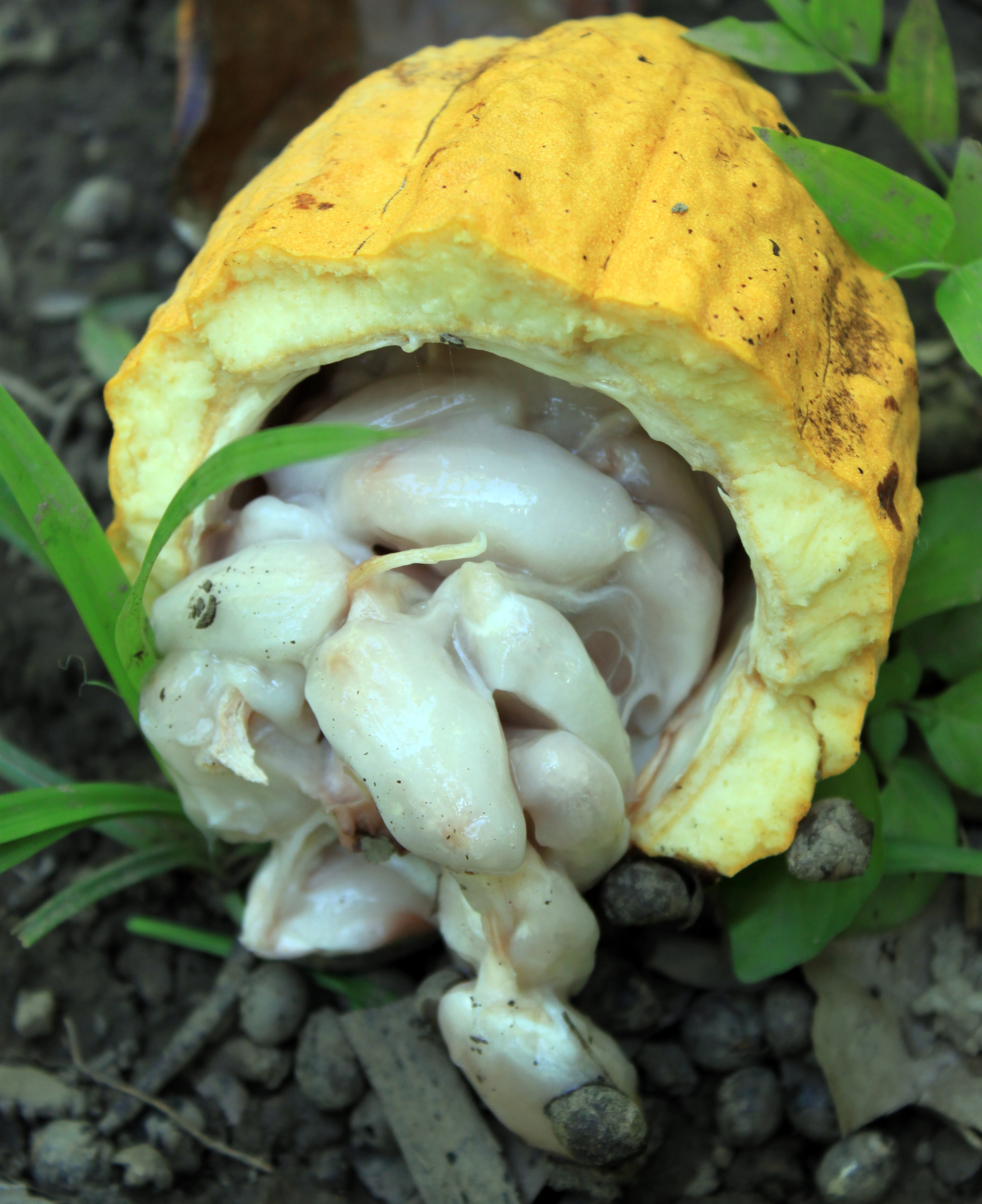
Cacao

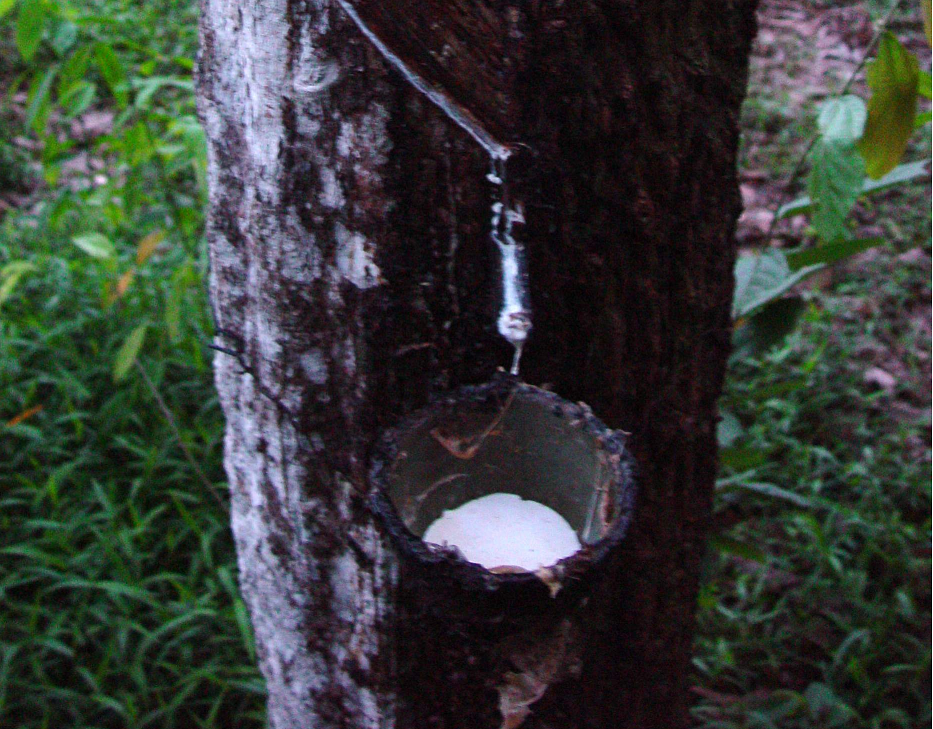
Rubber

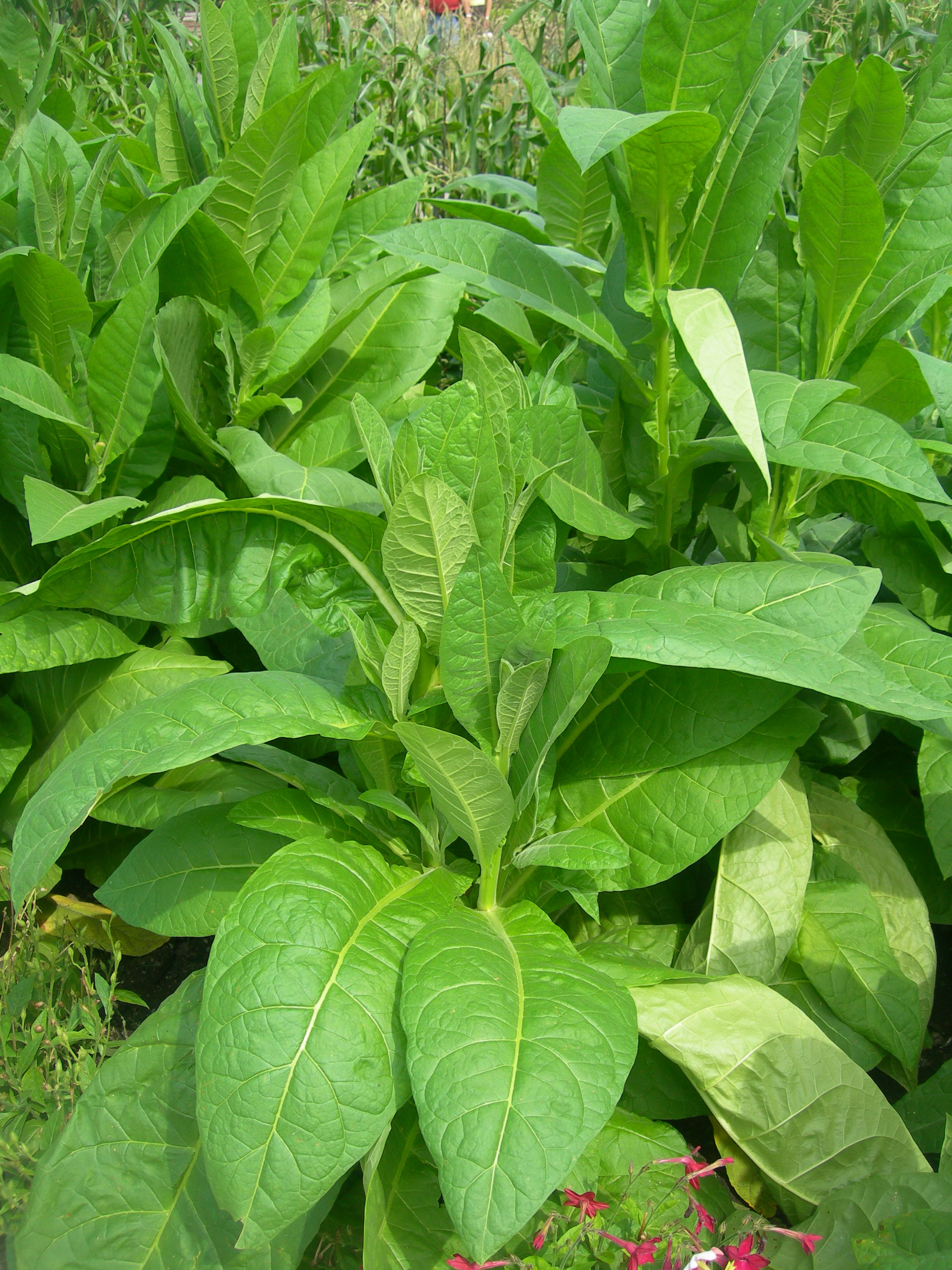
Tobacco

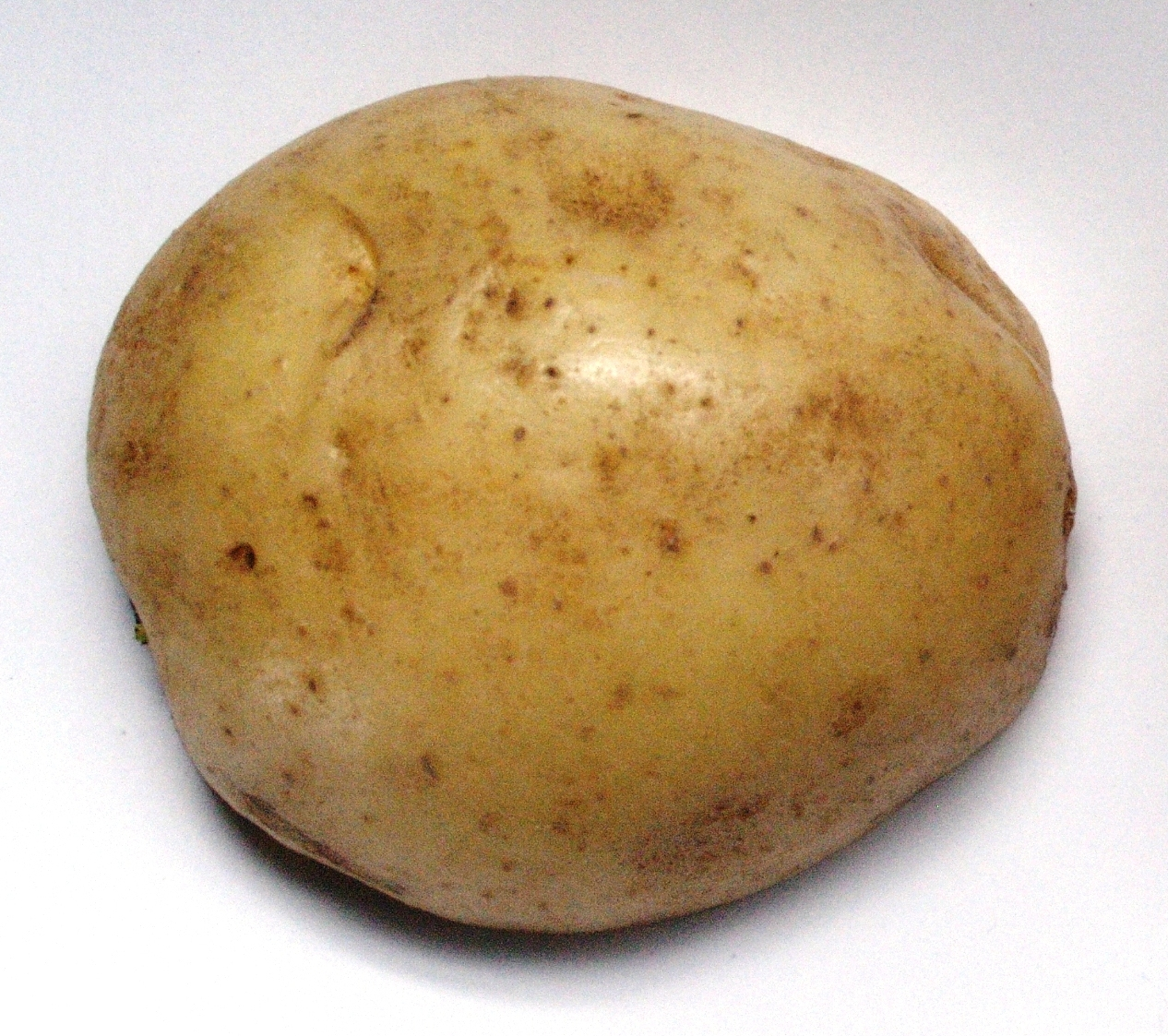
Potatoes

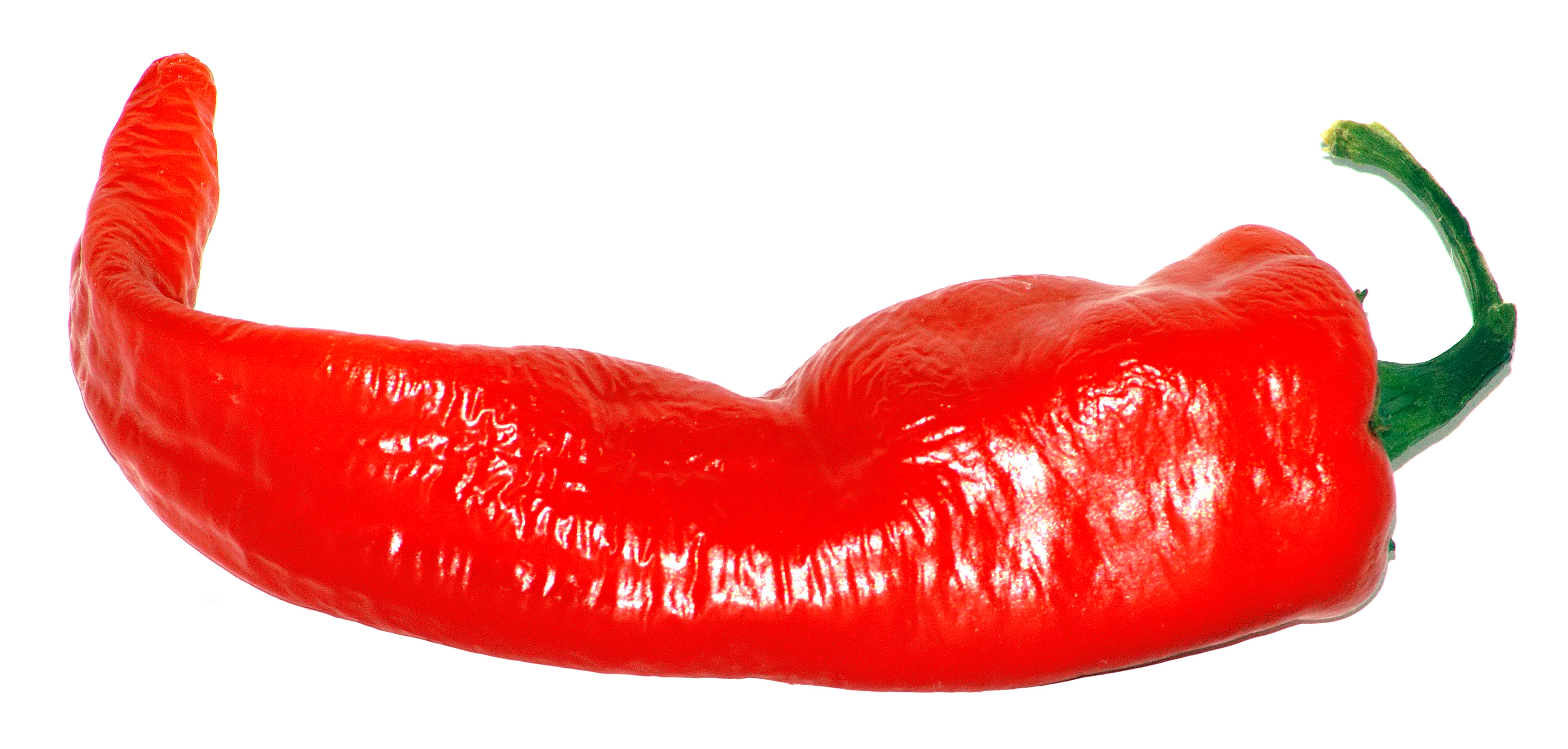
Peppers

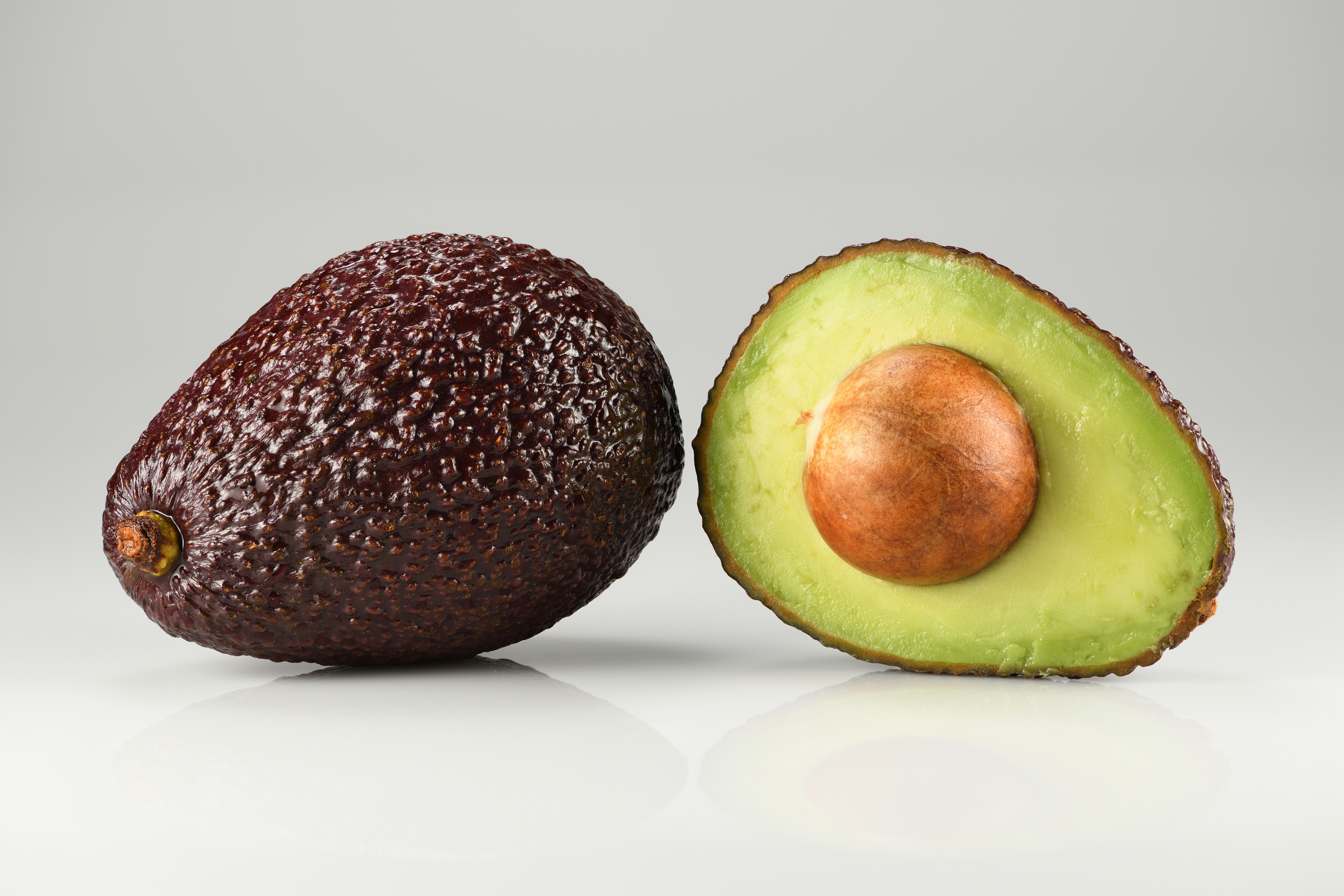
Avocados

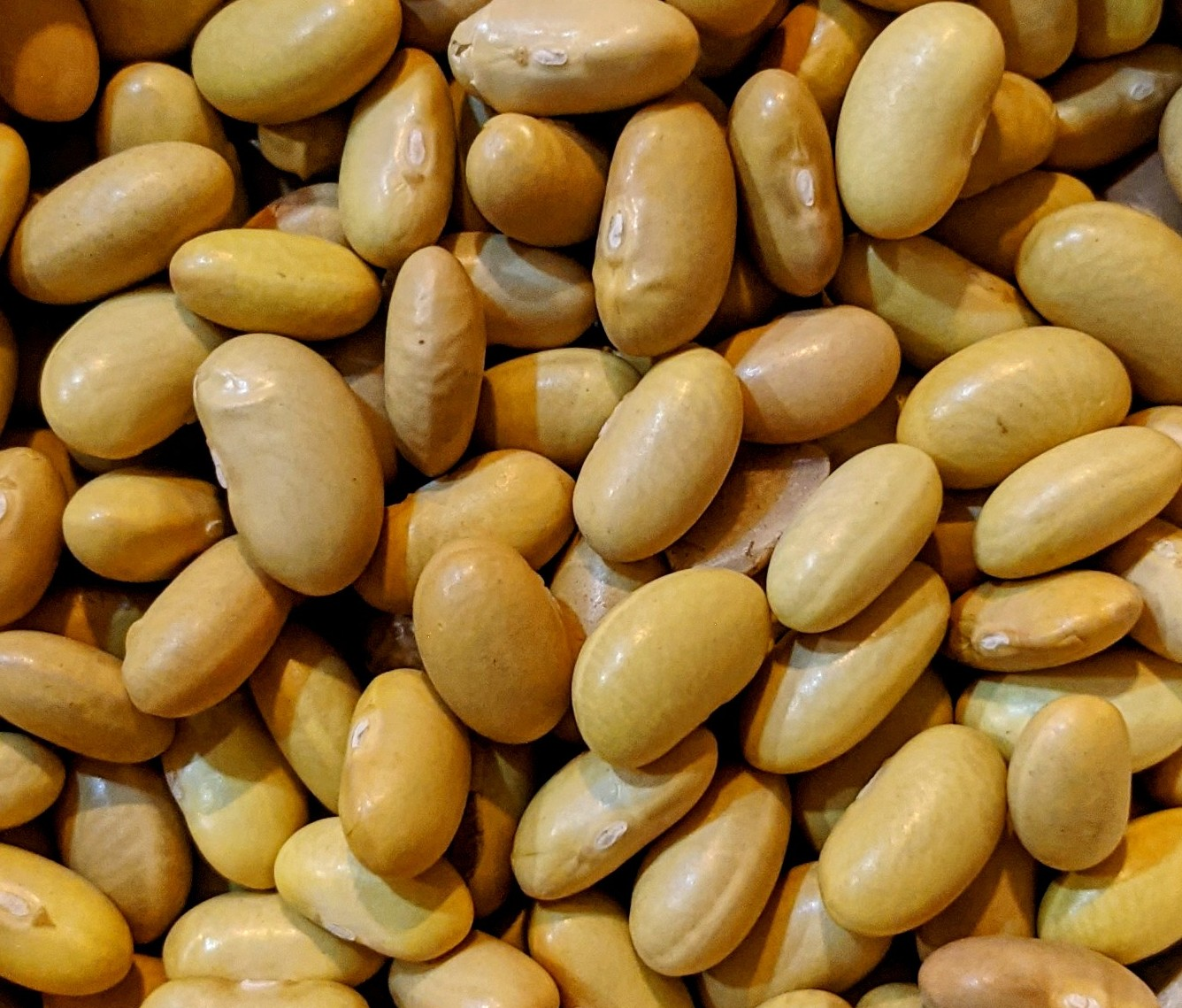
Beans

New World crops are those crops, food and otherwise, that are native to the New World (mostly the Americas) and were not found in the Old World before 1492 AD. Many of these crops are now grown around the world and have often become an integral part of the cuisine of various cultures in the Old World. Notable among them are the "Three Sisters": maize, winter squash, and climbing beans.

== List of crops ==
New World crops by plant structure used
Grains	Little barley, maize, maygrass, wild rice
Pseudograins	Amaranth, chia, knotweed, goosefoot, quinoa, sunflower, sumpweed†
Fruit	Açaí, acerola, avocado, American blueberry, cashew apple, chayote, cherimoya, American cranberry, chili pepper, curuba, custard apple, Virginia strawberry, feijoa, fox grape, Muscadine grape, guava, huckleberry, jabuticaba, jerivá, jurubeba, macaúba, naranjilla, papaya, pawpaw, passionfruit, peppers, American persimmon, pineapple, pitanga, pitaya, prickly pear, soursop, squashes and pumpkins, sugar-apple, white sapote, black sapote, yellow sapote, babaco, achacha, tamarillo, tomato, tomatillo, tucum Nuts: American chestnut, Araucaria, black walnut, Brazil nut, cashew, hickory, pecan, shagbark hickory, vanilla, Chilean hazelnut, ice cream bean, peanut, Quercus
Spices	Allspice
Seed crops	Achiote, Guaraná, cocoa bean
Beans	Common bean, lima bean, peanut, scarlet runner bean, tepary bean
Root	Arracacha, jicama, canna, cassava, leren, sweet potato, yacón
Underground stems (tubers, rhizomes, bulbs etc)	Arrowroot, sunroot, camas bulb, hopniss, mashua, oca, potato, ulluco
Leaf	Agave, coca, tobacco, yerba mate, yucca, Yaupon Holly
Fluid	Balsam of Peru, chicle, maple syrup, rubber
Wood	Logwood
Fiber	Some cotton species

== Timeline of cultivation ==
The new world developed agriculture by at least 8000 BC. The following table shows when each New World crop was first domesticated.

Timeline of cultivation
Date	Crops	Location
8000 BCE	Squash	Oaxaca, Mexico
8000–5000 BCE	Potato	Peruvian and Bolivian Andes
6000–4000 BCE	Peppers	Bolivia
5700 BCE	Maize	Guerrero, Mexico
5500 BCE	Peanut	South America
5000 BCE	Avocado	Mexico
c. 4200 BCE	Sea-island cotton	Peru
4000 BCE	Common bean	Central America
3400 BCE	Mexican cotton	Tehuacan Valley, Mexico
3300 BCE	Cocoa	Ecuador
3000 BCE	Sunflowers, other beans	Arizona–New Mexico
1500 BCE	Sweet potato	Altiplano Cundiboyacense, Colombia
500 BCE	Tomato	Mexico

== Dissemination to the Old World ==
The transfer of people, crops, precious metals, and diseases from the Old World to the New World and vice versa is called the Columbian Exchange.

Food historian Lois Ellen Frank calls potatoes, tomatoes, corn, beans, squash, chili, cacao, and vanilla the "magic eight" ingredients that were found and used only in the Americas before 1492 and were taken via the Columbian Exchange back to the Old World, dramatically transforming the cuisine there. According to Frank,

If we deconstruct that these foods were inherently native, then that means that the Italians didn't have the tomato, the Irish didn't have the potato, half the British National Dish—Fish and Chips—didn't exist. The Russians didn't have the potato, nor did they have vodka from the potato. There were no chiles in any Asian cuisine anywhere in the world, nor were there any chiles in any East Indian cuisine dishes, including curries. And the French had no confection using either vanilla or chocolate. So the Old World was a completely different place.

== See also ==
- First agricultural revolution
- List of food plants native to the Americas
- Neolithic founder crops
- Timeline of agriculture and food technology
