= Eastern Agricultural Complex =

Achaeological culture in eastern North America

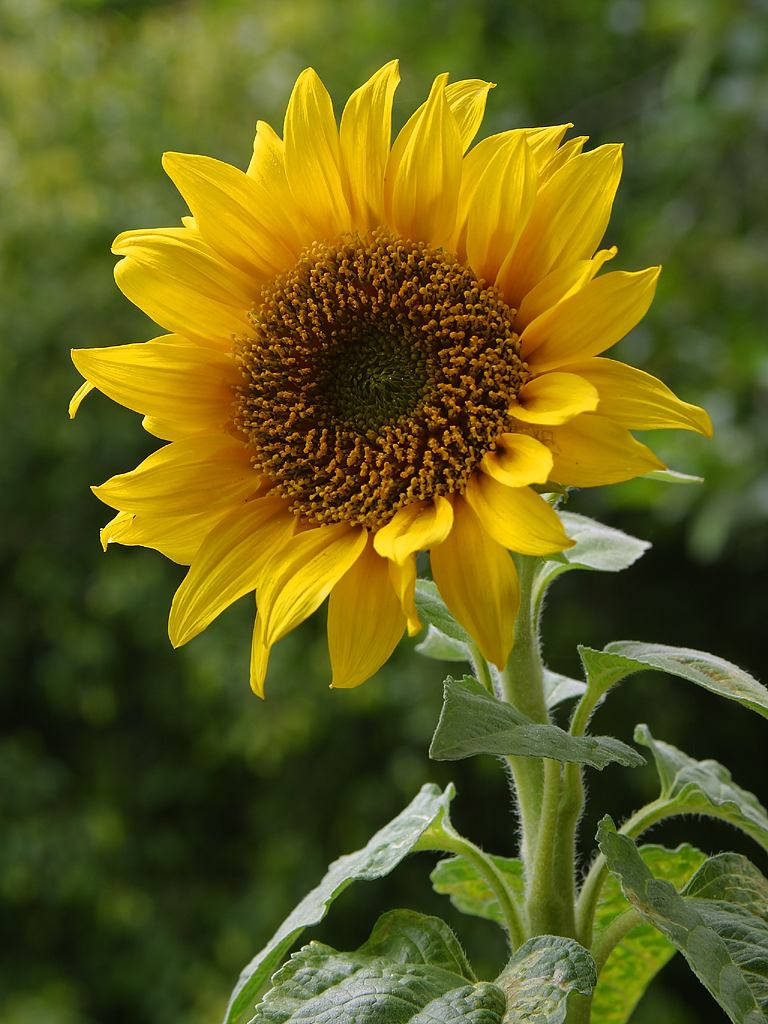
The sunflower was one of the plants that made up the Eastern Agricultural Complex.

The Eastern Agricultural Complex in the woodlands of eastern North America was one of about 10 independent centers of plant domestication in the pre-historic world. Incipient agriculture dates back to about 5300 BC. By about 1800 BC the Native Americans of the woodlands were cultivating several species of food plants, thus beginning a transition from a hunter-gatherer economy to agriculture. After 200 BC when maize (Zea mays, commonly called "corn") from Mexico was introduced to the Eastern Woodlands, the Native Americans of the eastern United States and adjacent Canada slowly changed from growing locally cultivated plant species to a maize-based agricultural economy. The cultivation of local indigenous plants other than squash and sunflower declined and was eventually abandoned. The formerly domesticated plants returned to their wild forms.

The first four plants known to have been domesticated at the Riverton Site in Illinois in 1800 BC were goosefoot (Chenopodium berlandieri), sunflower (Helianthus annuus var. macrocarpus), marsh elder (Iva annua var. macrocarpa), and squash (Cucurbita pepo ssp. ovifera). Several other species of plants were later domesticated.

== Origin of name and concept ==
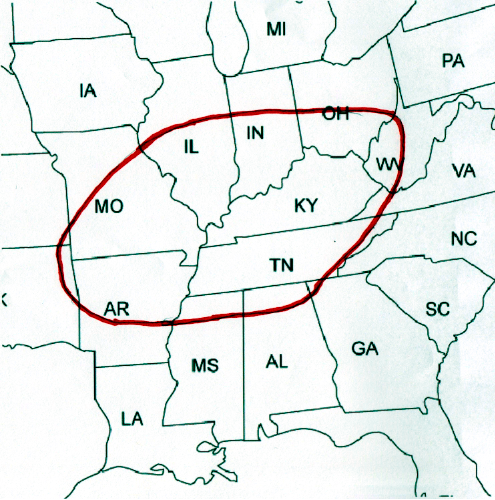
A map of the area in which the Eastern Agricultural Complex was first established.

The term Eastern Agricultural Complex (EAC) was popularized by anthropologist Ralph Linton in the 1940s. Linton suggested that the Eastern Woodland tribes integrated maize cultivation from Mayans and Aztecs in Mexico into their own pre-existing agricultural subsistence practices. Ethnobotanists Volney H. Jones and Melvin R. Gilmore built upon Ralph Linton's understanding of Eastern Woodland agriculture with their work in cave and bluff dwellings in Kentucky and the Ozark Mountains in Arkansas. George Quimby also popularized the term "Eastern complex" in the 1940s. Authors Guy Gibbons and Kenneth Ames suggested that "indigenous seed crops" is a more appropriate term than "complex".

Until the 1970s and 1980s most archaeologists believed that agriculture by Eastern Woodland peoples had been imported from what is now Mexico, along with the trio of subtropical crops: maize (corn), beans, and squash. What became accepted by the 21st century is that agriculture in the Eastern Woodlands preceded the import of crops from Mexico and that the Eastern Woodlands were one of about ten cultural regions in the world to become an "independent center of agricultural origin." In the 1970s and 1980s, new archaeological techniques demonstrated that by 1800 BC the Native Americans of the eastern woodlands had learned to cultivate indigenous crops independently and that indigenous crops formed an important part of their diets. A major element in determining that plants were cultivated rather than being collected in the wild was the larger size of edible seeds and the thinner seed coat of the domesticated plant compared to its wild relative, an attribute of domesticated crops that came about through human selection and manipulation. When cultivation of most indigenous plants ceased in favor of maize agriculture about 900 AD, seed sizes and seed coats of plants reverted to their former uncultivated size and thickness.

== Cultivated species ==
The earliest cultivated plant in North America is the bottle gourd, remains of which have been excavated at Little Salt Spring, Florida dating to 8000 BC. Squash (Cucurbita pepo var. ozarkana) is considered to be one of the first domesticated plants in the Eastern Woodlands, having been found in the region about 5000 BC, though possibly not domesticated in the region until about 1000 BC. The squash that was originally part of the complex was raised for edible seeds and to produce small containers (gourds), not for the thick flesh that is associated with modern varieties of squash. Cucurbita argyrosperma has been found in the region dated to circa 1300-1500 BC. C. pepo cultivars crookneck, acorn, and scallop squash appeared later.

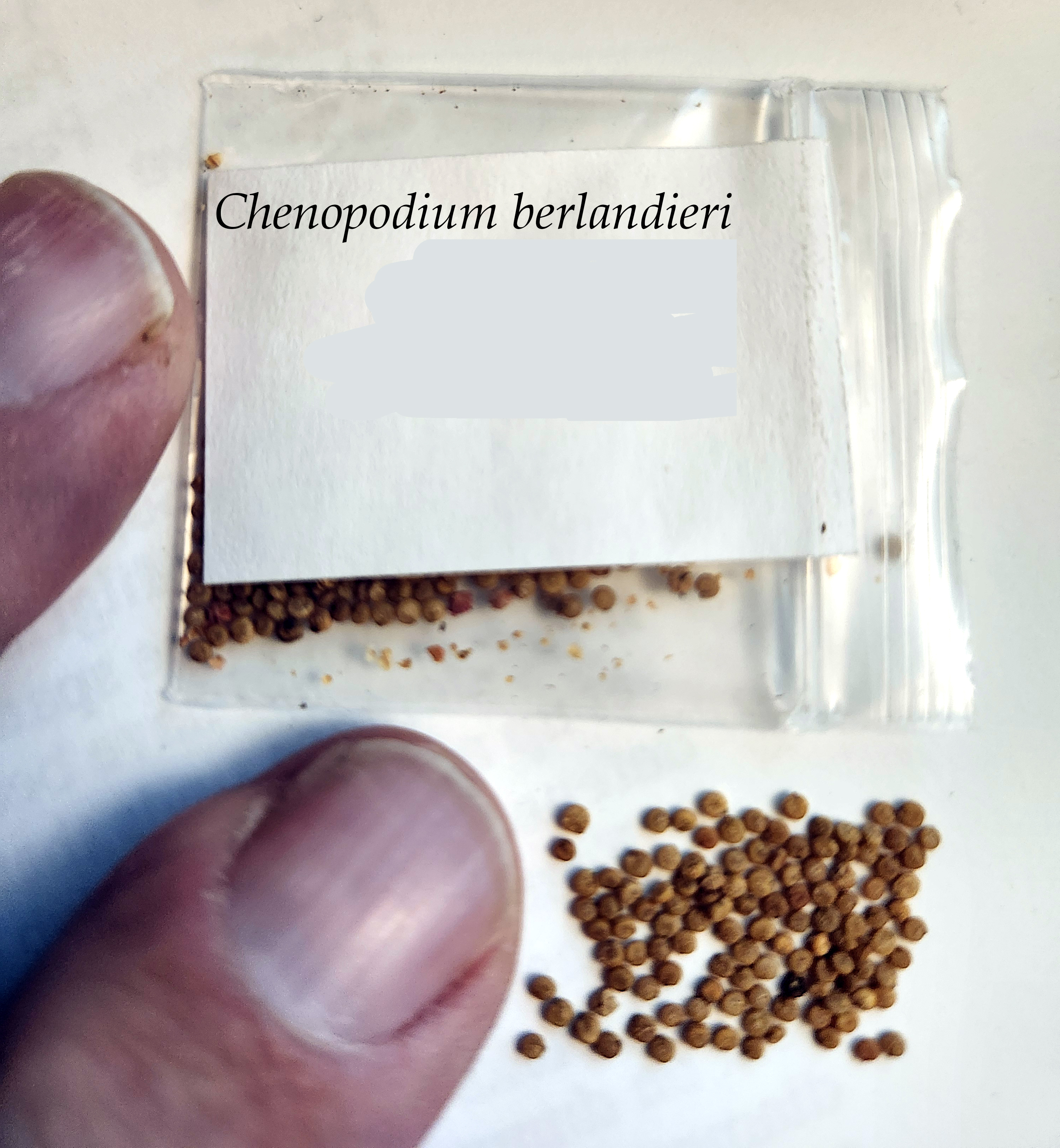
Chenopodium berlandieri seeds, huauzontle (Nahuatl).

Other plants of the EAC include

- goosefoot or lambsquarters (Chenopodium berlandieri);
- sunflower (Helianthus annuus);
- sumpweed or marsh elder (Iva annua);
- little barley (Hordeum pusillum);
- maygrass (Phalaris caroliniana); and
- erect knotweed (Polygonum erectum), which should not be confused with the Japanese knotweed (Reynoutria japonica) that is considered an invasive species in the eastern United States today.

The plants are often divided into "oily" or "starchy" categories. Sunflower and sumpweed have edible seeds rich in oil. The seeds of erect knotweed and goosefoot are starches, as are maygrass and little barley, both of which are grasses that yield grains that may be ground to make flour.

== Development ==
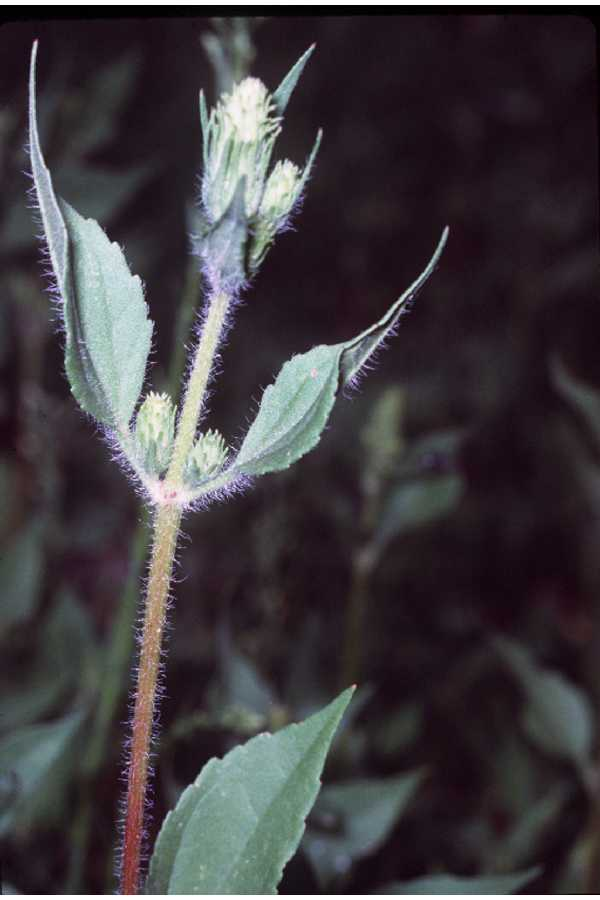
Iva annua (sumpweed, marshelder)

The archaeological record suggests that humans were collecting these plants from the wild by 6000 BC. In the 1970s, archaeologists noticed differences between seeds found in the remains of pre-Columbus era Native American hearths and houses and those growing in the wild. In a domestic setting, the seeds of some plants were much larger than in the wild, and the seeds were easier to extract from the shells or husks. This was evidence that Indigenous gardeners were selectively breeding the plants to make them more productive and accessible.

The region of this early agriculture is in the middle Mississippi valley, from Memphis north to St. Louis and extending about 300 miles east and west of the river, mostly in Missouri, Illinois, Kentucky, and Tennessee. The oldest archaeological site known in the United States in which Native Americans were growing, rather than gathering, food is Phillips Spring in Missouri. At Phillips Spring, dating from 3000 BC, archaeologists found abundant walnuts, hickory nuts, acorns, grapes, elderberries, ragweed, bottle gourd, and the seeds of Cucurbita pepo, a gourd with edible seeds that is the ancestor of pumpkins and most squashes. The seeds found at Phillips Spring were larger than those of wild C. pepo. The cause of this distinction is inferred to be human cultivation. Humans were selecting, planting, and tending seeds from plants that produced larger and tastier seeds. Ultimately, they would manipulate C. pepo to produce edible flesh.

By 1800 BC, Native Americans were cultivating several different plants. The Riverton Site in the Wabash River valley of Illinois, near the present day village of Palestine, is one of the best known early sites of cultivation. Ten house sites have been discovered at Riverton, indicating a population of 50 to 100 people in the community. Among the hearths and storage pits associated with the houses, archaeologists found a large number of plant remains, including a large number of seeds of chenopods (goosefoot or lamb's quarters) which are likely cultivated plants. Some of the chenopod (Chenopodium berlandieri) seeds had husks only a third as thick as those of wild seeds. Riverton farmers had bred them selectively to produce a seed easier to access than wild varieties of the same plant.

The wild food guru of the 1960s, Euell Gibbons, gathered and ate chenopods. "In rich soil," he said, "lamb's quarters will grow four or five feet high if not disturbed, becoming much branched. It bears a heavy crop of tiny seeds in panicles at the end of every branch. In early winter, when the panicles are dry, it is quite easy to gather these seeds in considerable quantity. Just hold a pail under the branches and strip them off. Rub the husks between the hands to separate the seed and chaff, then winnow out the trash. I have collected several quarts of seed in an hour, using this method. The seeds are quite fine, being smaller than mustard seeds, and a dull blackish-brown color....I find it pretty good food for humans."

Another plant species at Riverton that can confidently be identified as domesticated was sunflower (Helianthus annuus). This is based on the larger size of the seed in the domesticated than in the wild varieties. Remains of plants that were used, but may or may not have been domesticated at Riverton, include bottle gourd (Lagenaria siceraria), squash (C. pepo), wild barley (Hordeum pusillum) and marsh elder (Iva annua).

== Domestication ==
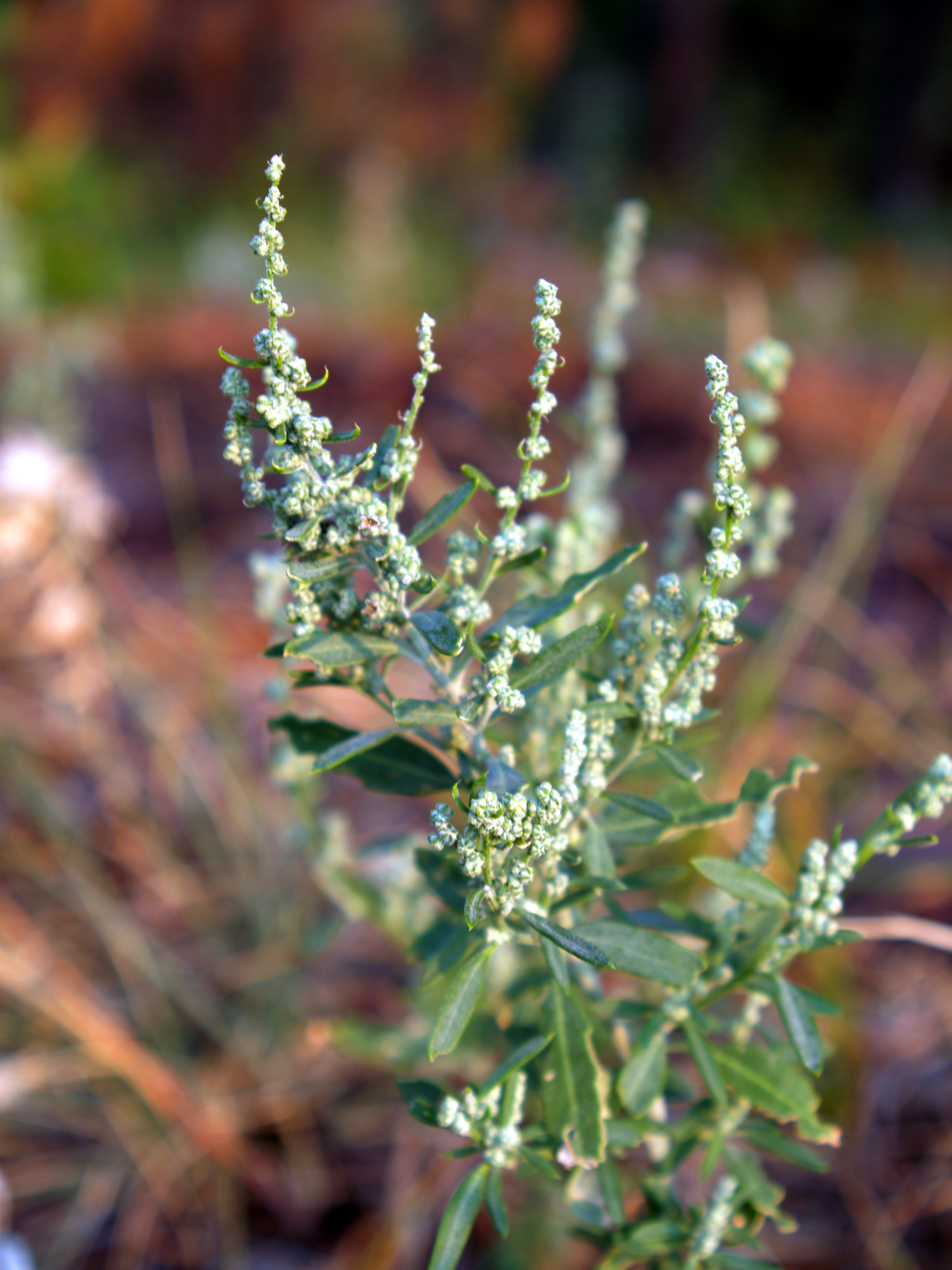
Chenopodium berlandieri or lambsquarters

Some of the species cultivated by Native Americans for food are today considered undesirable weeds. Another name for marshelder is sumpweed; chenopods are derisively called pigweed, although one South American species with a more attractive name, quinoa, is a health food store favorite. Many plants considered weeds are the colonizers of disturbed soil, the first fast-growing weeds to spring up when a natural or man-made event, such as a fire, leaves a bare patch of soil.

The process of domestication of wild plants cannot be described with any precision. However, Bruce D. Smith and other scholars have pointed out that three of the domesticates (chenopods, I. annua, and C. pepo) were plants that thrived in disturbed soils in river valleys. In the aftermath of a flood, in which most of the old vegetation is killed by the high waters and bare patches of new, often very fertile, soil were created, these pioneer plants sprang up like magic, often growing in almost pure stands, but usually disappearing after a single season, as other vegetation pushed them out until the next flood.

Native Americans learned early that the seeds of these three species were edible and easily harvested in quantity because they grew in dense stands. C. pepo was important also because the gourd could be made into a lightweight container that was useful to a seminomadic band. Chenopods have edible leaves, related to spinach and chard, that may have also been gathered and eaten by Native Americans. Chenopod seeds are starchy; marsh elder has a highly nutritious oily seed similar to sunflower seeds.

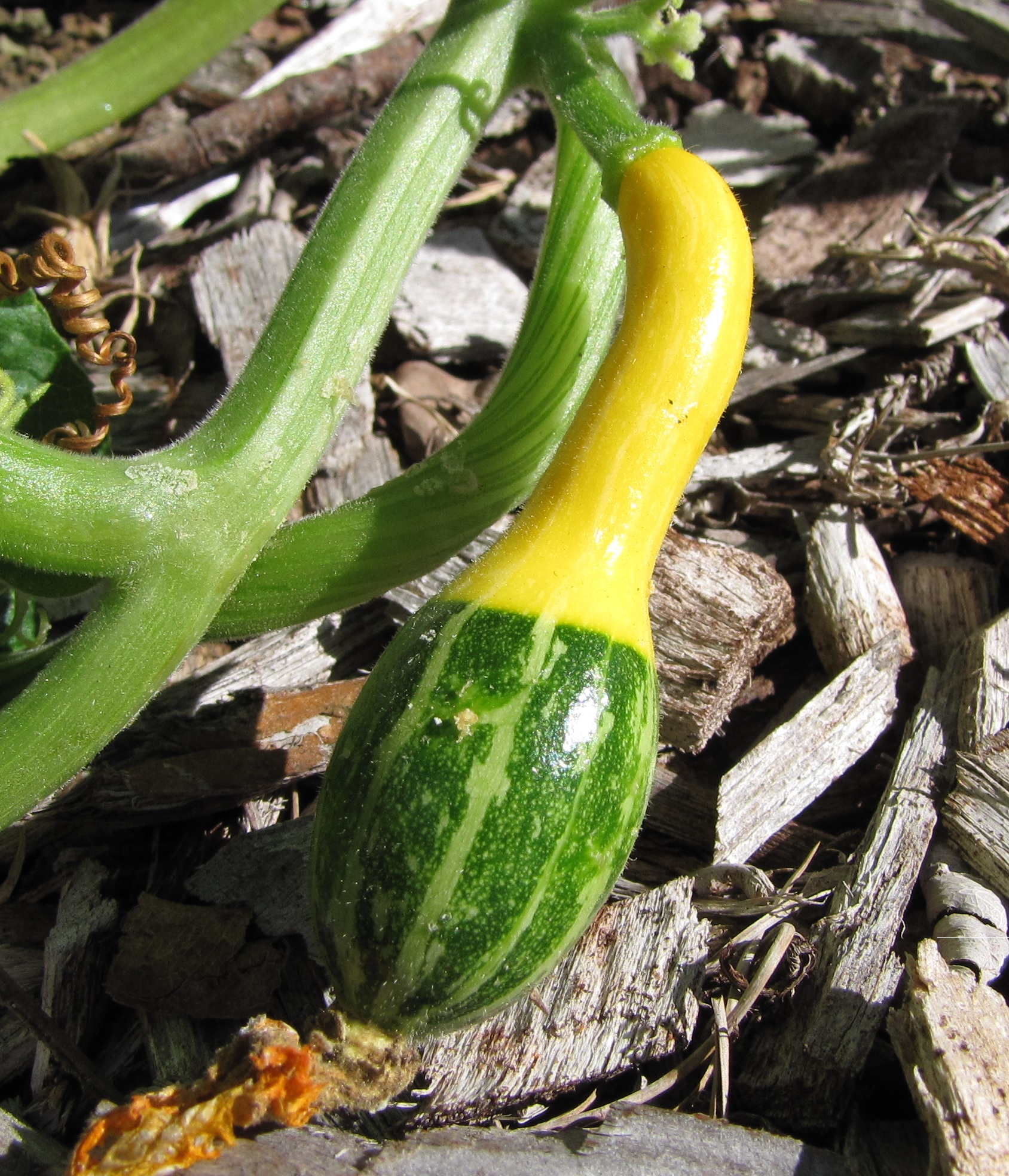
Cucurbita pepo was bred to produce both edible squash and gourds.

In gathering the seeds some were undoubtedly dropped in the sunny environment and disturbed soil of a settlement, and those seeds sprouted and thrived. Over time the seeds were sown and the ground was cleared of any competitive vegetation. The seeds which germinated quickest (i.e. thinner seed coats) and the plants which grew fastest were the most likely to be tended, harvested, and replanted. Through a process of unconscious selection and, later, conscious selection, the domesticated weeds became more productive. The seeds of some species became substantially larger and/or their seed coats were less thick compared to the wild plants. For example, the seed coats of domesticated chenopodium is less than 20 microns thick; the wild chenopodium of the same species is 40 to 60 microns thick. Conversely, when Native Americans quit growing these plants, as they did later, their seeds reverted within a few years to the thickness they had been in the wild.

By about 500 BC, seeds produced by six domesticated plants were an important part of the diet of Native Americans in the middle Mississippi River valley of the Eastern Woodlands region.

== Introduction of maize ==
The local indigenous crops were replaced slowly by other more productive crops developed by the Mesoamericans in what is now called Mexico: maize, beans and additional varieties of squash. Maize, or corn, was a relative latecomer to the Eastern Woodlands Cultures. The oldest known evidence of maize in what is now known as Mexico dates to 6700 BC. The oldest evidence of maize cultivation north of the Rio Grande in use is by about 2100 BC at several locations in what later became Arizona and New Mexico.

Maize was first grown by Eastern Woodlands Cultures by around 200 BC, and highly productive localized varieties became widely used around 900 AD. The spread was so slow because the seeds and knowledge of techniques for tending them had to cross inhospitable deserts and mountains, and more productive varieties of maize had to be developed to compete with local indigenous crops and to suit the cooler climates and shorter growing seasons of the northern regions. Maize does not flower under the long day conditions of summer north of tropical Mexico, requiring genetic adaptation. Maize was first grown as a supplement to existing local indigenous agricultural plants, but gradually came to dominate as its yields increased. Ultimately, the EAC was thoroughly replaced by maize-based agriculture. Most EAC plants are no longer cultivated, and some of them (such as little barley) are regarded as pests by modern farmers.

== See also ==
- Three Sisters (agriculture)
- Native American cuisine
- Sixty Islands
