= Bruce D. Smith =

American archaeologist and curator (born 1946)

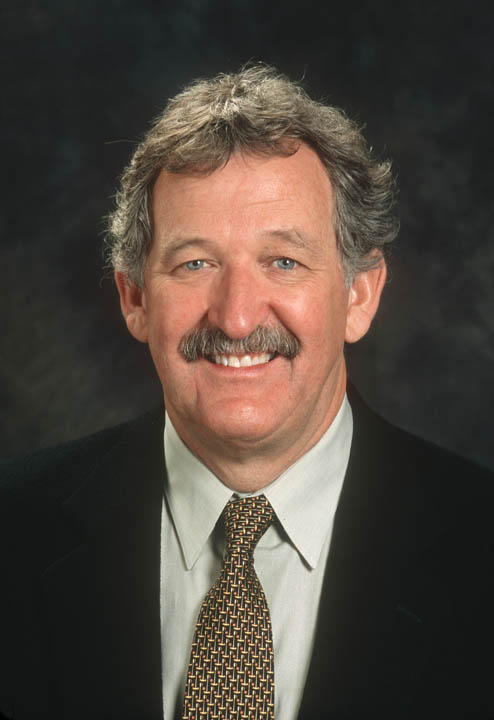
- Bruce D. Smith in 2003
- Born: 1946 (age 78–79); Iowa City, Iowa
- Occupation: Archaeologist

Bruce D. Smith (born 1946) is an American archaeologist and curator at the Smithsonian Institution's National Museum of Natural History who primarily focuses on the interaction of humans with their environment, especially the origins of agriculture in eastern North America agricultural complex.

== Early life and education ==
Smith was born in Iowa City, Iowa, the youngest of three brothers, and grew up in Highland Park, Michigan. His father was a history professor at Wayne State University and his mother was a librarian. He graduated from Cranbrook Schools, Bloomfield Hills, Michigan in 1964, where his parents had sent him for his senior year to strengthen his study habits. His college degrees are all from the University of Michigan: BA 1968, MA 1971, PhD 1973. His first field excavation was as an undergraduate in southeast Missouri, studying the Mississippian culture. Smith was an assistant professor of anthropology at Loyola University Chicago (1973–1974) and University of Georgia (1974–1977) before beginning his 37+ year career at the Smithsonian.

During the 1968–1969 school year, Smith taught 7th grade math in Inkster, Michigan instead of serving in the Vietnam War. He then joined the United States Army Reserve for five years as a combat medic. For his reserve training periods he wore a short-hair wig so he would not have to cut his hair. During his graduate school time he was part of a group of graduate students who belonged to the New Archaeology movement. His PhD dissertation was on the animal bones that had been found in the Missouri sites, focusing on why that culture hunted a small number of animal species.

== Smithsonian career ==
While at the Smithsonian, Smith has worked as an anthropologist, archaeologist, archaeobiologist, and curator. Much of his work there involves the National Museum of Natural History. While at the Smithsonian, Smith has been a member of several organizations, including the National Academy of Sciences and American Academy of Arts and Sciences. Interested in humanity's transition from hunter-gatherer societies to agricultural societies, after arriving at the Smithsonian Smith began focusing on proving that plant domestication arose independently in eastern North America rather than having spread to there from Mexico. This work began in the early 1980s with a cigar box full of seeds that had been stored in the attic of the Smithsonian. This box contained about 50,000 Chenopodium berlandieri (lamb's quarters, gooseberry) seeds. Helianthus (sunflower) and Iva annua (marshelder) had already been shown to have been domesticated early, but Cucurbita (squash and pumpkin) proved to have been domesticated even earlier. Using genetic analysis, Smith and others showed that Cucurbita pepo had been independently domesticated twice, once in Mexico and once in eastern North America.

Smith married Melinda Zeder, who is an archaeobiologist at the Smithsonian's National Museum of Natural History. Because she studies Old World animals and he studies New World plants, they have only co-authored three articles.

== Honors ==
Smith has published nine books and over 120 articles and received these awards and honors:

- 1972 Horace H. Rackham Prize Fellowship, University of Michigan
- 1986 Regent's Publication Program Fellow for 1987, Smithsonian Institution
- 1987 Robert L. Stigler Jr. Lectures in Archaeology, University of Arkansas
- 1988 Japan Society for the Promotion of Science Fellowship
- 1990 W. S. Webb Lecture in Archaeology, University of Kentucky
- 1993 Presidential Recognition Award, Society for American Archaeology
- 1995 Special Achievement Award, Society for American Archaeology
- 1996 James Henry Breasted Prize, American Historical Association. Rivers of Change selected as the best book in any field of history prior to A.D. 1000
- 1997 Book Award, Society for American Archaeology. The Emergence of Agriculture selected as the best book in archaeology written for a general audience
- 1997 Fellow, American Association for the Advancement of Science
- 2002 Brittingham Visiting Scholar, University of Wisconsin, Madison
- 2003 Elected to the United States National Academy of Sciences
- 2005 R. Fryxell Award and Medal for Interdisciplinary Research, Society for American Archaeology
- 2006 Distinguished Lecturer, 2006, Department of Anthropology, University of Kentucky
- 2007 NMNH 2006 Science Achievement Award
- 2010 Presidential Recognition Award, Society for American Archaeology.
- 2011 Elected to the American Academy of Arts and Sciences

== Selected works ==
- Smith, Bruce D. (1978). Prehistoric Patterns of Human Behavior: A Case Study in the Mississippi Valley. Waltham, MA: Academic Press. ISBN 978-0-12-650650-1.
- Smith, Bruce D., ed. (1990). The Mississippian Emergence. Washington, D.C.: Smithsonian Institution Press. ISBN 978-0-87474-844-4. JSTOR 1185810.
- Smith, Bruce D. (1992). Rivers of Change: Essays on Early Agriculture in Eastern North America. Clinton Corners, NY: Eliot Werner Publications. ISBN 978-1-58834-046-7.
- Smith, Bruce D. (1994). The Emergence of Agriculture. New York: W. H. Freeman and Co. ISBN 978-0-7167-5055-0.
- Smith, Bruce D., ed. (2011). The Subsistence Economies of Indigenous North American Societies. Landover, MD: Smithsonian Institution Scholarly Publications, Rowman-Littlefield. ISBN 978-1-935623-01-4.
