= Container revolution (pottery) =

Term for the introduction of pottery in the Eastern Woodlands of North America

Container Revolution refers to the introduction of pottery to use as containers.

Regarding the Eastern Woodlands of North America during the Archaic period; as these societies became more sedentary, they were able to manufacture and use vessels that would have broken during transportation. Pots allowed for more efficient processing of wild seeds, which created less work for people when the pots were made waterproof. More-efficient seed collection systems and the deliberate manipulation of the native plants, in turn led to the domestication of several plant species. This is just one of many cultural developments that began during this time.
