= Rogan (container) =

A rogan is a small container made of birch bark, used by various indigenous peoples of the Eastern Woodlands in North America.

== Etymology ==
According to the Oxford English Dictionary, the word derives ultimately from one or more Algonquian languages, by way of a word ouragan attested in French.

== Construction and use ==
Rogans could be relatively tightly constructed; a folktale features one used to trap mosquitoes. At least in some traditions, they were presumed to be made by women. A rogan is made from a single sheet of birch bark, measured and cut so that the center of the sheet becomes the bottom and carefully measured incisions allow the rest of the sheet to be folded into sides, which are then sewed together. Two smaller pieces of bark, one round and one rectangular, comprise the lid.
