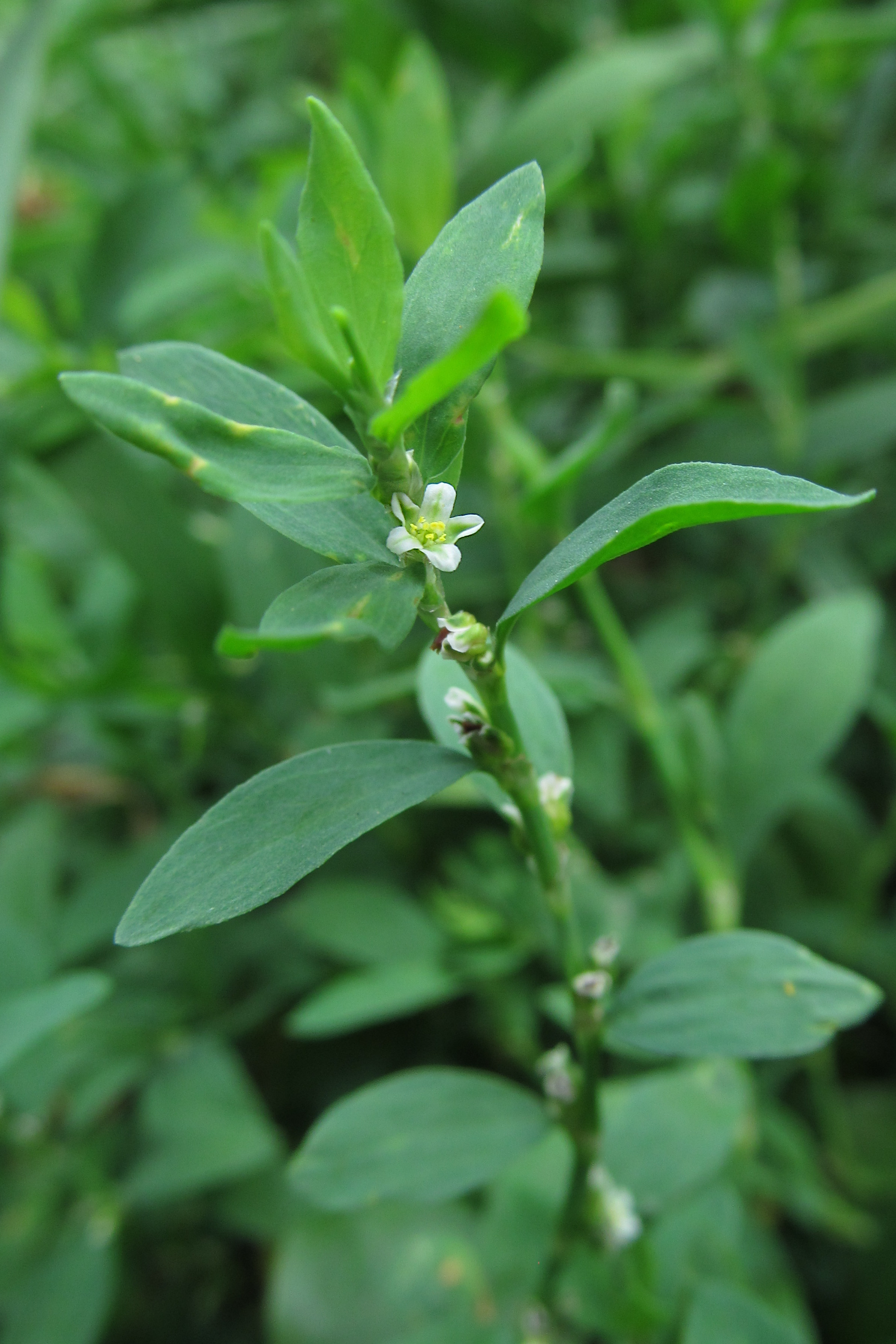

Scientific classification
- Kingdom: Plantae
- Clade: Tracheophytes
- Clade: Angiosperms
- Clade: Eudicots
- Order: Caryophyllales
- Family: Polygonaceae
- Genus: Polygonum
- Species: P. erectum

Binomial name
- Polygonum erectum L. 1753 not Roth 1783 nor Vell. 1827

= Polygonum erectum =

Species of flowering plant

Polygonum erectum, commonly called erect knotweed, is a North American species of herbaceous plant in the buckwheat family (Polygonaceae). It is found primarily in the northeastern and north-central parts of the United States, but with scattered populations in other parts of the US and also in Canada.

Its natural habitat is in bottomland forests and riparian areas. It is tolerant of ecological degradation, and can also be found in disturbed open areas such as pastures and lawns.

It was cultivated for food by Native Americans as early as 1000 BC. Domesticated in the area of North America just west of the Appalachian Mountains, erect knotweed was part of a group of crops known as the Eastern Agricultural Complex, along with goosefoot, sunflower, sumpweed, little barley, maygrass, and squash. These crops became the primary source of calories for many communities in North America until the gradual introduction of maize supplanted them from circa 500 AD to circa 850 AD, culminating in the Three Sisters method of farming maize, squash, and beans together circa 1050 AD. By 1 AD, domesticated subspecies of erect knotweed (Polygonum erectum subsp. watsoniae) was developed in the Ohio River Valley, but it has since become extinct.

== Description ==
Polygonum erectum is an erect annual growing 10–75 cm (4–29.5 in) tall with many to few, non-wiry branches. The leaves have distinct veins and entire edges or have jagged cut edges. The pedicels are shorter or equal the length of the calyx and typically longer than the ocreae. The closed flowers have a calyx that is typically 3 mm (0.12 in) long, green in color and 5-lobed. Flowers in clusters of 1 to 5 in cymes that are produced in the axils of most leaves. The calyx segments are unequal with the outer lobes longer and not keeled and the inner ones narrowly keeled. The tepals are greenish, with yellowish tinting or sometimes with whitish tints. The seeds are produced in fruits called achenes that can be of two different types; one type is dark brown with a shiny surface and is broadly egg-shaped, typically about 2.5 mm (0.098 in) long. The other achene type is dull brown, exsert and egg-shaped, and 3–3.5 mm (0.12–0.14 in) long. Late season fruiting is uncommon and if produced the achenes are 4 to 5 mm (0.16 to 0.20 in) long.

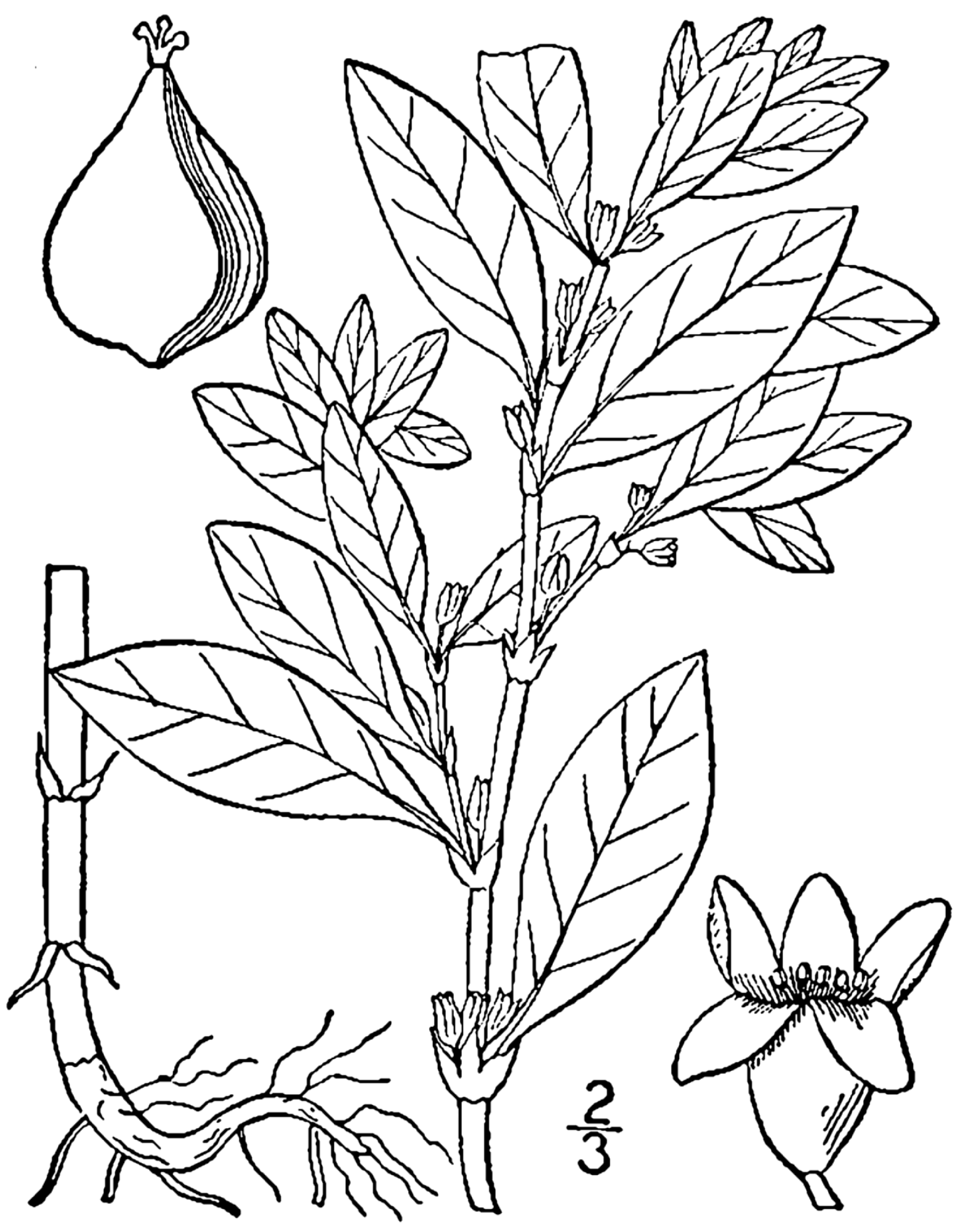
Botanical illustration of Polygonum erectum

== Conservation ==
Polygonum erectum is considered to be globally secure. However, it is uncommon throughout much of its range, and population have declined dramatically in some regions. It is listed as endangered in New Hampshire and New York.
