= Lamb's quarters =

Lamb's quarter, lambsquarters, and similar terms refer to any of various edible species of herbaceous plants otherwise known by the common names goosefoot or pigweed.

There are numerous variations, with or without hyphens and apostrophes, using one word or two, and singular or plural. As a rule, the British English spelling uses two terms with or without hyphen though usually with an apostrophe, while the American English spelling uses one word.

- In Europe, the term usually refers to Chenopodium album (white goosefoot).
- In North America, the term usually refers to Chenopodium berlandieri (pitseed goosefoot).

The name "lambsquarters" is thought to derive from the name of the English harvest festival Lammas quarter. This festival was associated both with sacrificial lambs and with the vegetable Chenopodium album.
