= Salts Cave Archeological Site =

- U.S. National Register of Historic Places
- Nearest city: Munfordville, Kentucky
- Area: 10 acres (4.0 ha)
- NRHP reference No.: 79000278
- Added to NRHP: May 15, 1979

Salts Cave Archeological Site, near Munfordville, Kentucky, is a cave and archeological site which was listed on the National Register of Historic Places in 1979. The cave is part of Mammoth Cave National Park.

It has also been known as West's Cave and as Old Salts Cave. It was listed for its information potential.

Salts Cave was explored, and mined for gypsum and medicinal sulphates, by Indigenous people from around 800-300 BC, during the Early Woodland period. It is archaeologically valuable for the many paleofaecal deposits and plant waste left behind by the miners, which give insight into their diets. These deposits show the miners were eating many crops farmed in the region (goosefoot, sumpweed, sunflower, maygrass, erect knotweed, and pepo gourd), as well as wild foods (particularly hickory nuts).

The listed area spans the borders of Hart County, Kentucky and Edmonson County, Kentucky.
