= Indigenous peoples of the Eastern Woodlands =

Cultural area of the Indigenous peoples of North America

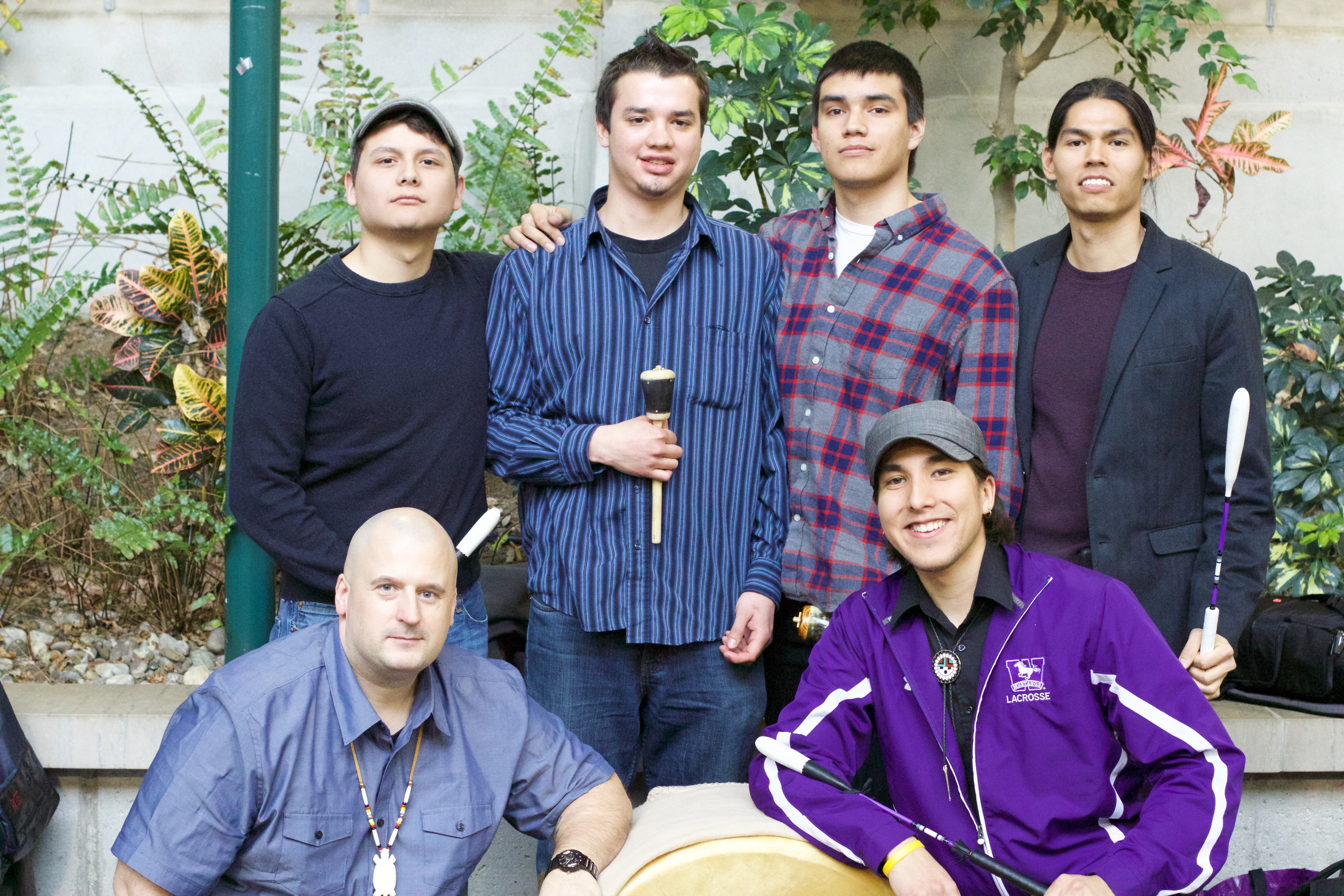
Purple Spirit Singers, Mohawk people, Ontario

The Eastern Woodlands is a cultural region of the Indigenous people of North America. The Eastern Woodlands extended roughly from the Atlantic Ocean to the eastern Great Plains, and from the Great Lakes region to the Gulf of Mexico, which is now part of the Eastern United States and Canada. The Plains Indians culture area is to the west; the Subarctic area to the north. The Indigenous people of the Eastern Woodlands speak languages belonging to several language groups, including Algonquian, Iroquoian, Muskogean, and Siouan, as well as apparently isolated languages such as Calusa, Chitimacha, Natchez, Timucua, Tunica and Yuchi. Many of these languages are still spoken today.

== Background ==
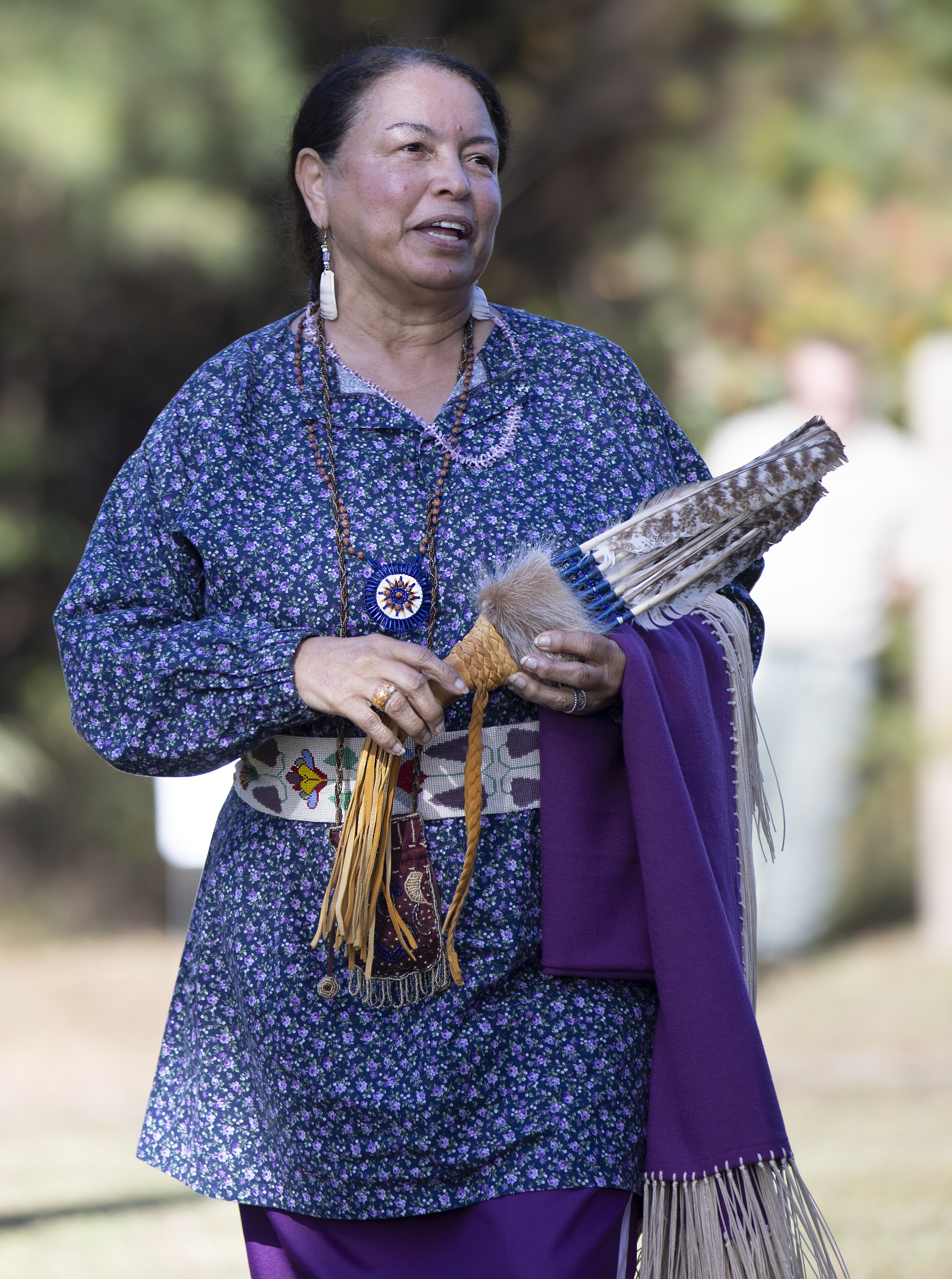
Citizen of the Rappahannock Tribe, Virginia

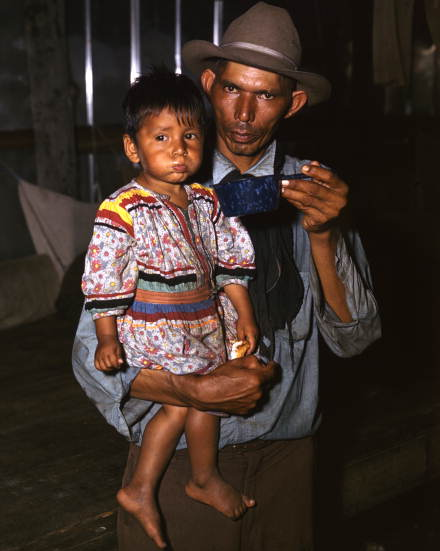
Seminole father and son at a barbeque, Big Cypress Reservation, Florida

The earliest known inhabitants of the Eastern Woodlands were peoples of the Adena and Hopewell cultures, the term for a variety of peoples, speaking different languages, who inhabited the Ohio and Mississippi river valleys between 800 BC and 800 AD, and were connected by trading and communication routes. The cultures had a tradition of building earthwork mounds and, in some cases, large shaped constructions known as effigy mounds. They had a variety of purposes, some apparently related to astronomical calculations and ritual observances.

These peoples were generally hunters and gatherers, while also relying on some farming to produce food on the fertile land in the Ohio and Mississippi river valleys. For example, research from the Late Archaic period suggests that they ate grains such as sunflower, sumpweed, chenopod, knotweed, maygrass, and barley, and consumed several types of nuts such as hickory nuts, pecans, walnuts, acorns, and chestnuts that are spread across a large portion of the region. They most likely also consumed several types of fleshy fruits like cabbage palm, persimmon, saw palmetto, or hawthorn that could be found in forest clearings and used as a supplemental source of vitamins and antioxidants. Tribes in the north may have also seen cultivation of tuber plants such as wild potato, garlic, and chufa that could grow in cold, frozen soil.

Because of this reliance on farming, these tribes did not migrate like the more northern Eastern Woodlands tribes and instead stayed in one place, which resulted in them developing new social and political structures.

The Eastern Woodlands tribes located further north (Algonquian-speaking people) relied heavily on hunting to acquire food. These tribes did not plant many crops, however, some tribes, such as the historic Ojibwe, grew wild rice and relied on it as one of their major food sources. The type of animals these tribes hunted depended on the geographic location of the tribe. For example, the tribes located close to the coast hunted seals, porpoises, and whales, while the more inland tribes hunted deer, moose, and caribou. The meat was either cooked to be eaten immediately or was smoke-dried, to preserve it for later consumption.

The largest political unit among the Eastern Woodland tribes were village bands, which were led by one chief. In the Eastern Woodlands Algonquian-speaking societies, patrilineal clans had names associated with animal totems; these clans comprised the village bands. The Eastern Woodlands Iroquoian-speaking societies had a matrilineal kinship system, with inheritance and property passed through the mother's line. The Iroquoian village-bands were also composed of numerous clans. Individuals would marry outside their clan to form exogamous clans. They considered themselves to be sibling with the other individuals within the exogamous clan.

== See also ==
- Indigenous peoples of the Northeastern Woodlands
- Indigenous peoples of the Southeastern Woodlands
