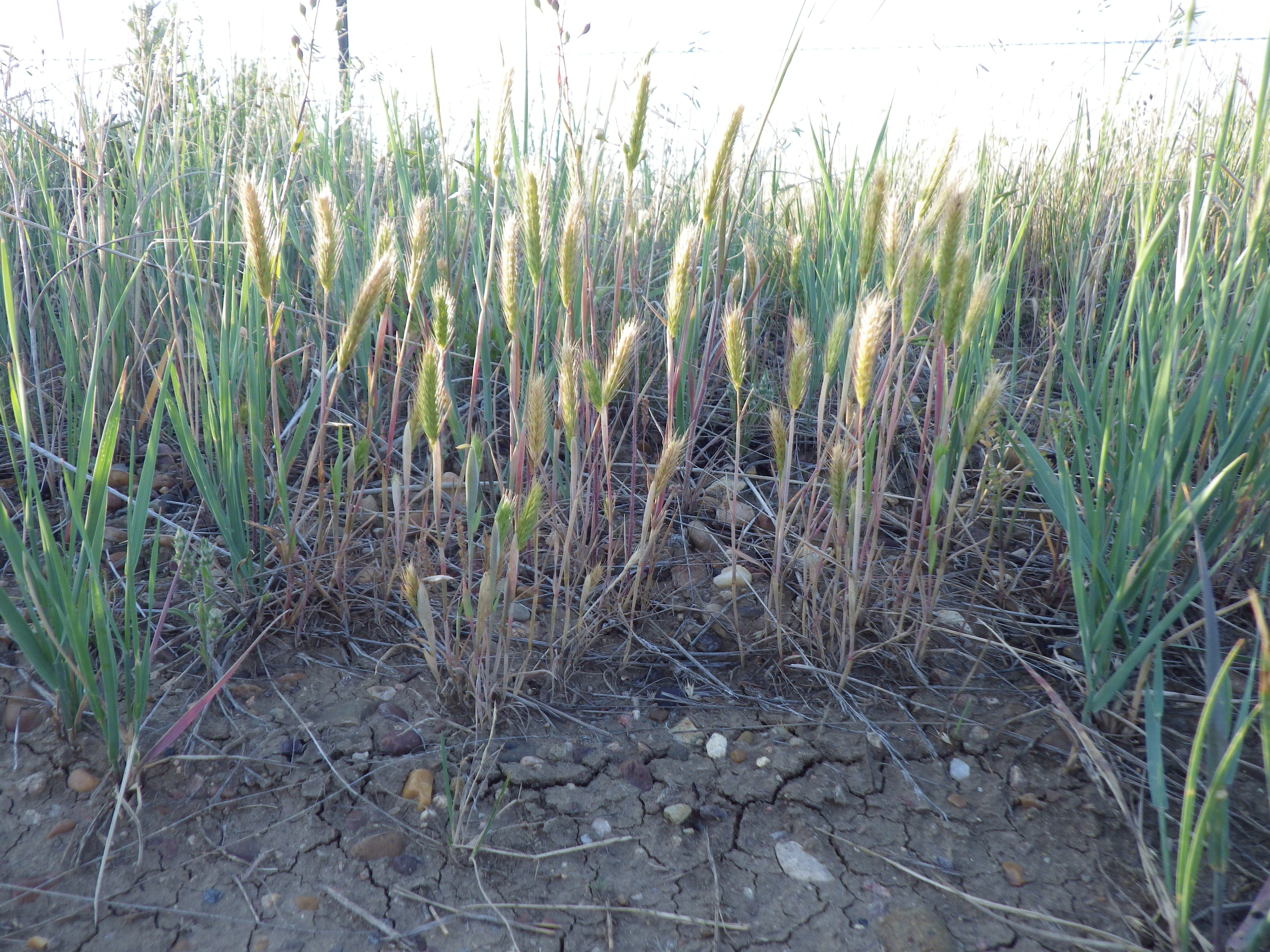
- Growing in a disturbed area

Scientific classification
- Kingdom: Plantae
- Clade: Tracheophytes
- Clade: Angiosperms
- Clade: Monocots
- Clade: Commelinids
- Order: Poales
- Family: Poaceae
- Subfamily: Pooideae
- Genus: Hordeum
- Species: H. pusillum

Binomial name
- Hordeum pusillum Nutt. (1818)

= Hordeum pusillum =

Species of grass

Hordeum pusillum, also known as little barley, is an annual grass native to most of the United States and southwestern Canada. It arrived via multiple long-distance dispersals of a southern South American species of Hordeum about one million years ago. Its closest relatives are therefore not the other North American taxa like meadow barley (Hordeum brachyantherum) or foxtail barley (Hordeum jubatum), but rather Hordeum species of the Pampas of central Argentina and Uruguay. It is less closely related to the Old World domesticated barley, from which it diverged about 12 million years ago. It is diploid.

== Etymology ==
Hordeum comes from the Latin word horreō, horrēre "to bristle " and pusillum is the "nominative neuter singular of pusillus"- "very little, very small, tiny."

== Description ==
First described in 1818 by Thomas Nuttall, Hordeum pusillum, also known as little barley, is an annual flowering plant native to the majority of North America, mainly the United States and southwestern Canada. It is a member of the subfamily Pooideae in the grass family Poaceae. The plant itself is approximately 14–40 cm (5.5–15.7 in) tall and is self-fertilizing. Leaves and spikelets are alternate. The flat, pubescent leaves can range anywhere from 2.4–12.7 cm (0.94–5.00 in) in length and 2.0–4.5 mm (0.079–0.177 in) wide. The sheath of little barley can be either glabrous or pubescent and wraps loosely around the stem. The inflorescence ranges between 4–8 cm (1.6–3.1 in) long. Of the three alternating floral spikelets, only one is fertile. The plant's growth period is during the winter months, producing mature grains by April. The roots are fibrous, and the mark of a mature spikelet is when they turn a tan to brown color. The stem changes from a bluish-green color to brown as the plant matures. Its habitat is in sunny locations on dry gravely soils, rock outcrops, roadsides, railroads, waste places, in grasslands, and on marsh edges.

== Germination ==
Little barley germinates best when exposed to light, and experiences best germination after one to two weeks of pre-chilling. Anymore than that and the viability of seeds decreases over time. After two weeks of pre-chilling, little barley seeds go into dormancy, allowing little barley to overwinter and come back year after year. Seeds germinate best between 17 and 20 degrees C. The more mature the seeds, the better they germinate.

== Pollination ==
Pollination occurs during the winter through the summer. The center spikelet is fertile whilst the lateral spikelets are male and infertile.

== Weed control ==
Little barley can suppress the growth of more desirable forage grasses. Little barley is best controlled prior to its dormancy in the fall or early spring, and can be further controlled through the use of the herbicides. Spring usage of herbicides has also been found effective at controlling the growth of little barley. Late winter or early spring treatment with Accent has been found effective. Prolonged usage of herbicides can result in higher tolerance.

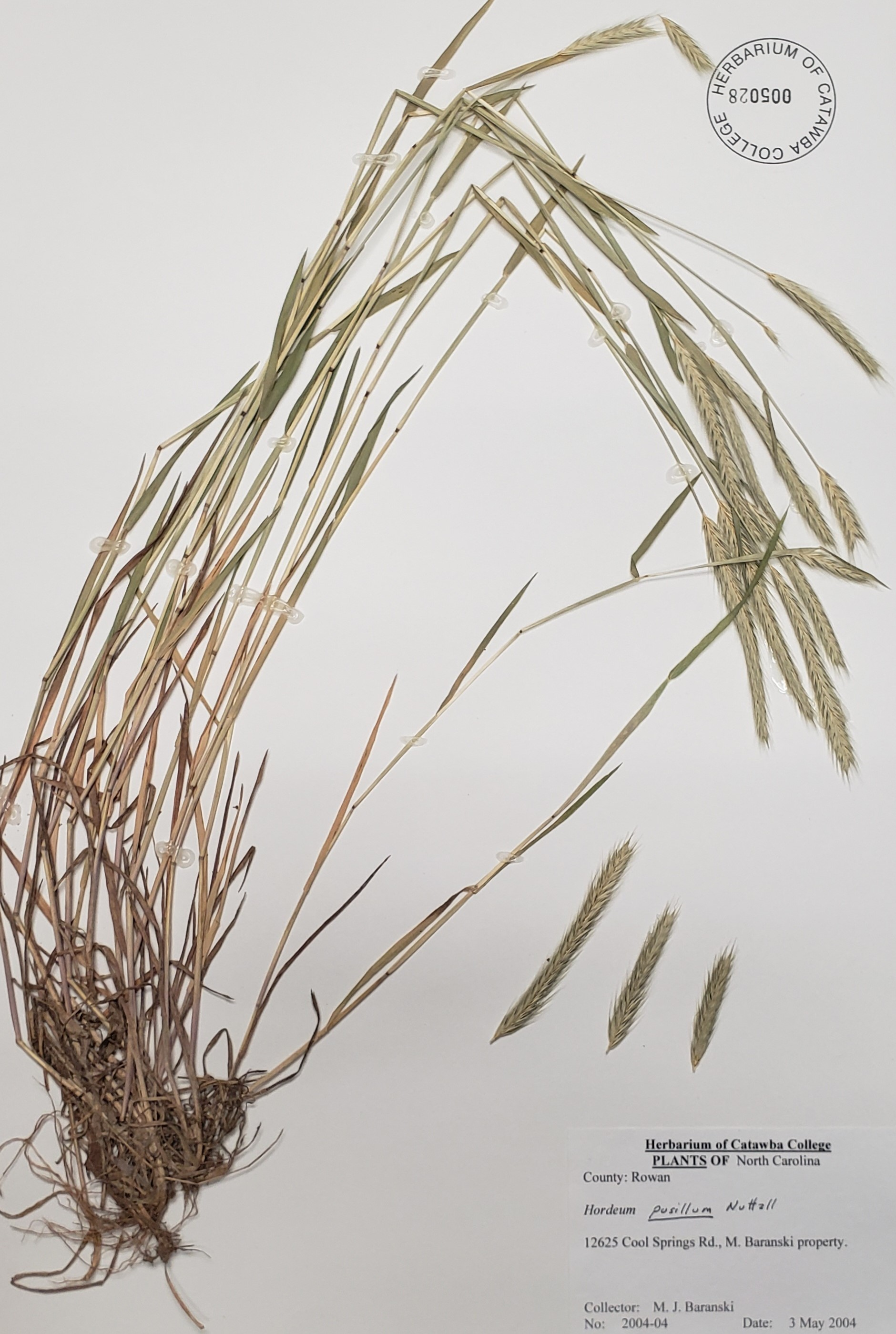
Hordeum pusillum herbarium sheet

== Domestication ==
Little barley is believed to have been cultivated by Native Americans due to its abundance in archaeological sites. Evidence for the earliest known cultivation in eastern North America was found at the Gast Spring site in what is today Louisa County, Iowa. Seeds were found alongside domesticated goosefoot seeds and squash or gourd rinds dating to 2,800 to 3,000 years ago. Large plots were required to produce adequate harvests due to the grain's small size. Hordeum pusillum was briefly domesticated during the Prehispanic period. Evidence suggests domestication took place in the southeastern and southwestern United States. In the southeastern and midwestern United States, however, domestication lasted through the Middle Archaic and protohistoric periods. To the Hohokam culture in Arizona, archeological evidence suggests that little barley was used for trade between other tribes whose diet did not normally include domesticated little barley.

Little barley cultivation is important in understanding pre-maize agriculture.

== Uses ==
The small grains are edible, and this plant was part of the Eastern Agricultural Complex of cultivated plants used in the Pre-Columbian era by Native Americans. Before being displaced by agriculture based on maize, little barley may have been domesticated.

== Edibility ==
The grains would be dried, processed, and then cooked before eating. Cultivated for its edible grains, it is also classified as a cereal grain. Little barley seeds have an awn, a sharp hair-like attachment on the grain, which was then separated from the grain and possibly parched, roasted, and boiled. The seeds are nutritious and starchy. 100 grams of little barley constitutes almost 24.3 percent of carbohydrates, 22.4 percent of protein, 18 percent of calories, and 5–6 percent of fiber and fat of a recommended daily 2,000-calorie diet.

== Allergenic ==
Little barley is known to be a mild allergen.
