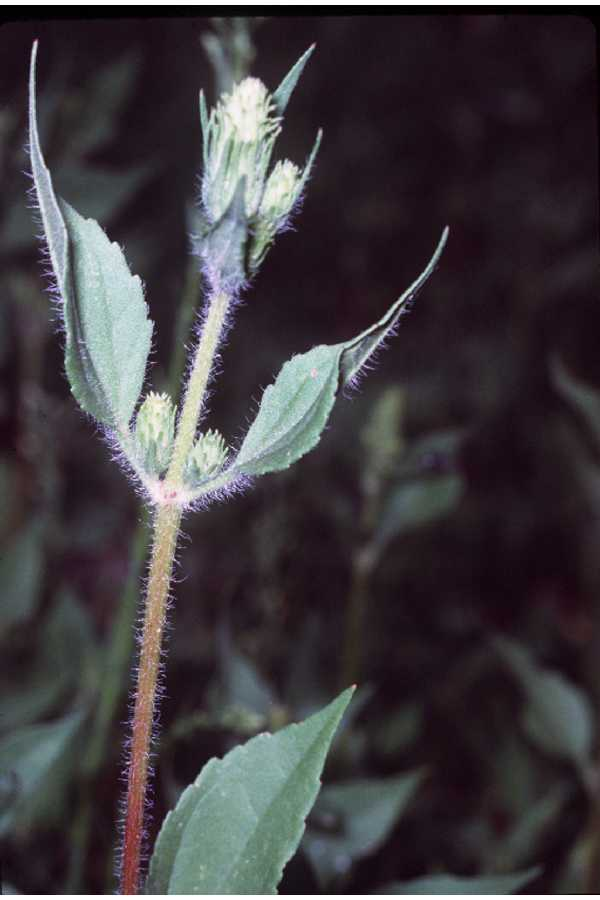

Conservation status
- Secure (NatureServe)

Scientific classification
- Kingdom: Plantae
- Clade: Tracheophytes
- Clade: Angiosperms
- Clade: Eudicots
- Clade: Asterids
- Order: Asterales
- Family: Asteraceae
- Tribe: Heliantheae
- Genus: Iva
- Species: I. annua

Binomial name
- Iva annua L. 1753

Synonyms
- Iva annua var. caudata (Small) R.C.Jacks.; Iva annua var. macrocarpa (S.F.Blake) R.C.Jacks.; Iva caudata Small; Iva ciliata var. macrocarpa S.F.Blake

= Iva annua =

Species of flowering plant

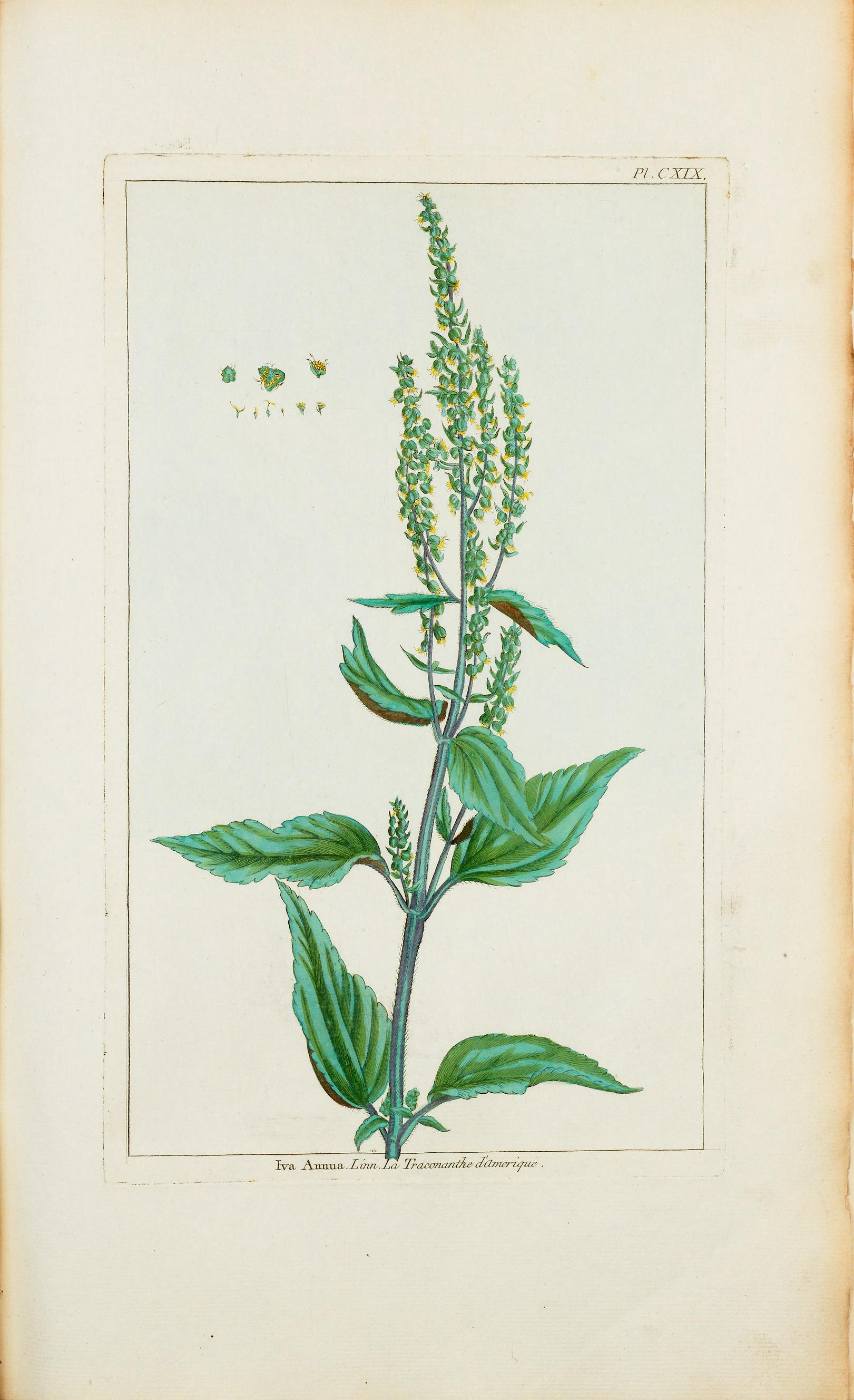
Illustration of Iva annua

Iva annua, the annual marsh elder or sumpweed, is a North American herbaceous annual plant in the family Asteraceae that was historically cultivated by Native Americans for its edible seed.

== Description ==
Iva annua is an annual herb up to 150 cm (5 feet) tall. The plant produces many small flower heads in a narrow, elongated, spike-like array, each head with 11–17 disc florets but no ray florets. Marshelder has a unique odor when the leaves or pollen are touched, but this odor is not present in winnowed seed.

Cultivated varieties of Marshelder (var. macrocarpa) bred by Native Americans possessed seeds 6-9mm in length; whereas wild-type Marshelder has seeds 3 mm in length on average (not exceeding 4.5 mm).

== Distribution ==
It is native to northeastern Mexico (Tamaulipas) and to the central and southern United States, primarily the Great Plains and Mississippi Valley as far north as North Dakota. There are some populations in the eastern US, but these appear to represent introductions.

=== Conservation ===
NatureServe evaluated Iva annua in 1998 as globally secure, G5.

== Uses ==
Iva annua was cultivated for its edible seed by Native Americans around 4,000 years ago in the central and eastern United States as part of the Eastern Agricultural Complex. It was especially important to the indigenous peoples of the Kansas City Hopewell culture in present-day Missouri and Illinois. The edible parts contain 32 percent protein and 45 percent oil.

However, like its relative ragweed, sumpweed possesses many objectionable qualities which include being a severe potential allergen and possessing a unique odor. Probably for these reasons it was abandoned after more pleasant alternatives (such as maize) were available and, by the time Europeans arrived in the Americas, had disappeared as a crop.

== See also ==
- New World crops
