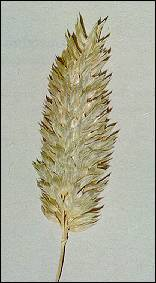

Scientific classification
- Kingdom: Plantae
- Clade: Tracheophytes
- Clade: Angiosperms
- Clade: Monocots
- Clade: Commelinids
- Order: Poales
- Family: Poaceae
- Subfamily: Pooideae
- Genus: Phalaris
- Species: P. caroliniana

Binomial name
- Phalaris caroliniana Walter

= Phalaris caroliniana =

Species of flowering plant

Phalaris caroliniana is a species of grass known as Carolina canarygrass and maygrass.

== Background ==
It is native to the southern United States, and it can be found as a naturalized species along the west coast of the United States, as well as northern Mexico, Europe, Australia, and Puerto Rico. It is most often found in moist to wet habitats, such as marshy meadows, and it can thrive in disturbed areas. It is an annual grass reaching a maximum height between 1 and 1.5 m (3.3 and 4.9 ft). The hairy inflorescence is roughly oval in shape and up to 7 cm (2.8 in) long by 2 cm (0.79 in) wide.

This grass probably made up part of the Eastern Agricultural Complex of plants cultivated by pre-Columbian Native Americans in the United States. Its grains have been identified in archaeological sites from Texas to Indiana to Alabama which may be four millennia old. Laboratory analysis of the grass seed indicates that it is quite nutritious, with a good amount of vitamins and minerals.
