= Estuaire-de-la-Rivière-Bonaventure Aquatical Reserve =

Aquatic reserve in Gaspésie, Quebec, Canada

- French: Réserve aquatique de l'Estuaire-de-la-Rivière-Bonaventure
- IUCN category II (national park)
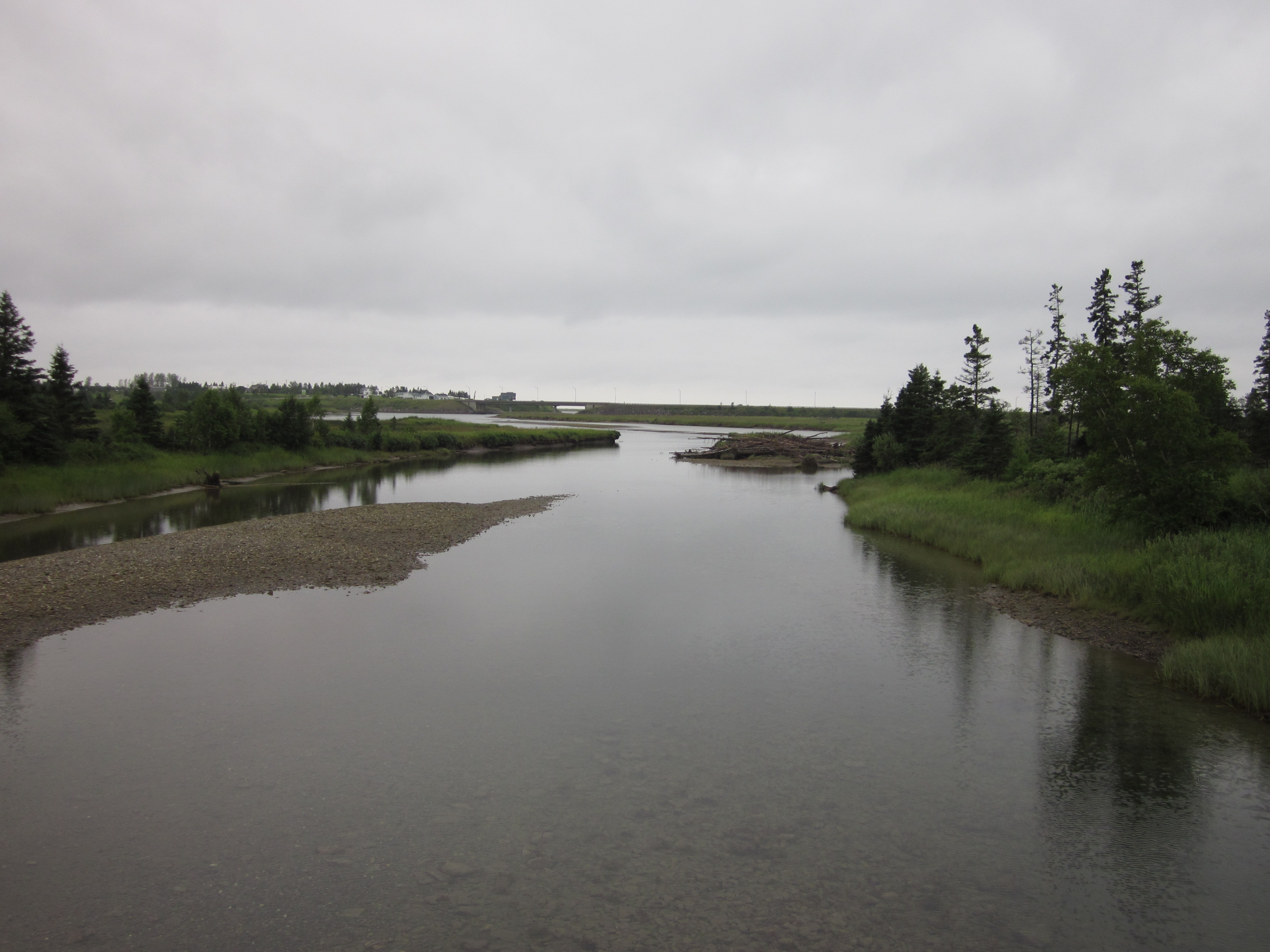
- Barachois of Bonaventure

- Location within Canada Location within Quebec
- Location: Baie-Sainte-Catherine, Charlevoix-Est Regional County Municipality / Sacré-Coeur, and Tadoussac, La Haute-Côte-Nord Regional County Municipality, Quebec, Canada
- Nearest city: Bonaventure
- Coordinates: 48°02′19″N 65°28′35″W
- Area: 218.73 km^{2} (84.45 sq mi)
- Established: 8 June 1998
- Governing body: Ministry of Sustainable Development, Environment, and Fight Against Climate Change

The aquatic reserve of Estuaire-de-la-Rivière-Bonaventure (French: Réserve aquatique de l'Estuaire-de-la-Rivière-Bonaventure) is an aquatic reserve of Quebec, in Canada, located near the town of Bonaventure in the Gaspé Peninsula. The mission of this protected area of 218.73 hectares (540.5 acres) is to preserve the estuary of the Bonaventure River, one of the ten barachois estuaries in Quebec. On the islands of the estuary one can find several rare species in Quebec including the Macoun's gentian (Gentianopsis virgata subsp. macounii), the Anticosti aster and mat muhly as well as twenty-seven other rare plant species in the Gaspé.

The reserve, born from the donation of a forestry company to the government of Quebec in 2001, was partially protected during the creation, in 2005, of the floral habitat of Barachois-de-Bonaventure, intended to safeguard the vegetation of the islands. The protected area, definitively created in 2009, is administered by the Ministry of Sustainable Development, Environment, and Fight Against Climate Change.

== Geography ==
Map of the reserve

The aquatic reserve has a total area of 218.73 hectares (540.5 acres) and includes part of the estuary of the Bonaventure River. It includes the Îles des Prés, des Sapins, des Chardons and Arseneault as well as the sandy spit of Île aux Pirates. It is entirely located on the territory of the town of Bonaventure in the Bonaventure Regional County Municipality of the administrative region of Gaspésie–Îles-de-la-Madeleine.

It encompasses the entire plant habitat of Barachois-de-Bonaventure, with an area of 38.67 hectares (95.6 acres); its southern part includes the 20.92 kilometres (13.00 mi) of the Pointe de Paspébiac waterfowl concentration area.

=== Geology and relief ===
The reserve is located in the Appalachian Mountains, more precisely on the bedrock of the Bonaventure formation; it is a formation composed of conglomerate, sandstone and red mudstone which dates from Mississippian (between 358 and 323 million years ago). The islands' deposits are composed of sand, gravel and silt with a small proportion of clay of marine origin. The shape of the islands evolves under the action of erosion and sedimentation linked to floods and ice.

Its relief is that of a river delta, at an altitude not exceeding ten meters.

=== Hydrography ===
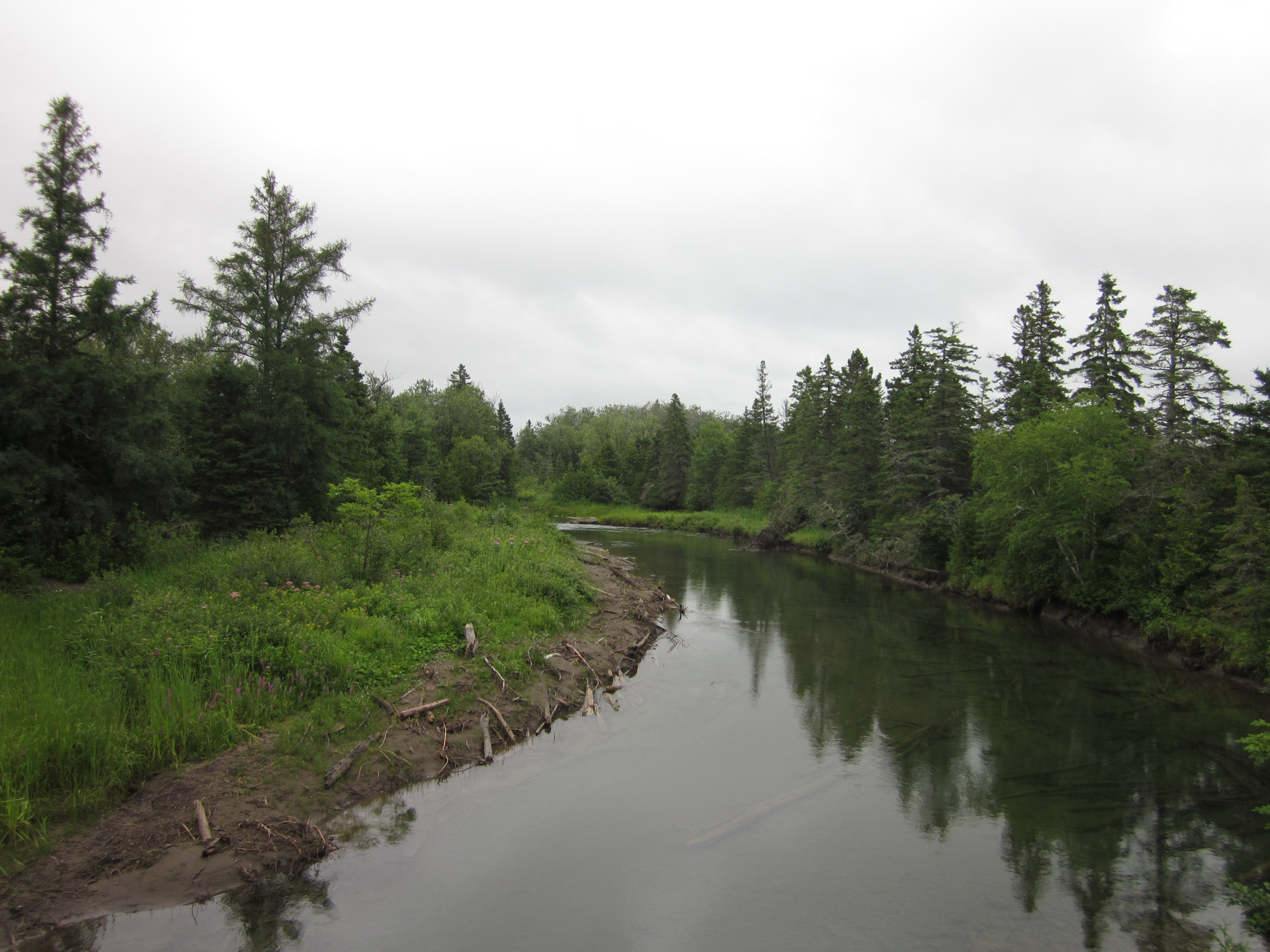
A channel of the Bonaventure River

The Bonaventure River, 125 kilometres (78 mi) long, has its source in the Chic-Choc Mountains at 487 metres (1,598 ft) altitude. It drains a basin of 2,391 kilometres (1,485.70 mi) and it has a discharge at the mouth of 46 cubic metres per second (1,600 cu ft/s), which makes it one of the most important rivers of the Gaspé Peninsula, after the rivers Restigouche and Matapédia. At each tide, the estuary lets in between 80,000 and 1,000,000 metres (3,280,839.895 ft) of seawater, which can penetrate up to 350 metres (1,150 ft) north of route 132 during low water. He is one of ten barachois estuaries in Québec.

=== Climate ===
Its climate, that of the coastal plain of Chaleur Bay, is characteristic of an average temperate zone, cool and rainy with harsh winters. However, the bay's maritime influence mitigates the extreme temperatures; winters are therefore milder than in Quebec, for example. The annual duration of sunshine is one of the highest after Montreal and the frost-free period is 140 days (12,000 ks). It is the region with the least snowfall in eastern Quebec. The prevailing winds, in winter as in summer, blow from the west.

== Natural environment ==
The name and delimitation of ecoregions differ according to the organizations that establish them. According to the Commission for Environmental Cooperation, the reserve is located in the Maritime Lowlands Eastern Temperate Forests. The Canadian ecological framework. Listed in the ecozone of the northern highlands of New Brunswick while the World Wildlife Fund locates it in the New England–Acadian forests ecoregion.

The northern highlands ecozone of New Brunswick includes in its upland areas forests of sugar maple, American beech and yellow birch. The valleys are dominated by eastern hemlock, balsam fir, white pine and white spruce. In the drier north of the ecoregion, grow white pine, red pine, jack pine, spruce and fir.

=== Delta ===
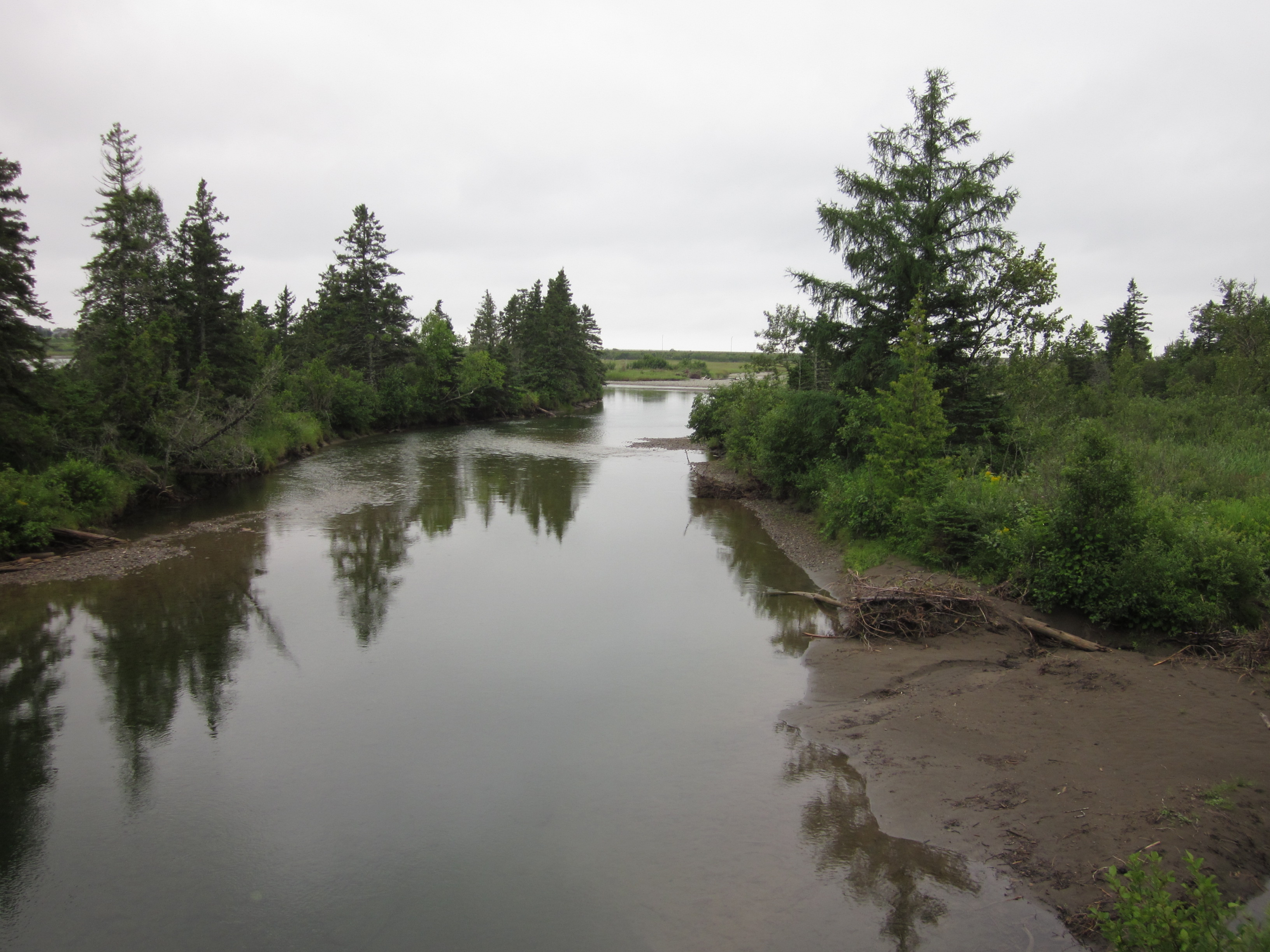
One of the channels of the Bonaventure River

The channels of the river are colonized by the Enteromorpha intestinalis, a plant very resistant to changes in salinity. The islands contain wooded swamps populated by black spruce, American elm, balsam poplar with unwooded portions colonized by herbaceous plants and shrubs. The broadleaf cattail is the dominant plant in freshwater marshes. The wet grasslands are populated by Canadian reedgrass, panicled bulrush, Canadian burnet, and earth loosestrife. The shrub swamps are composed of speckled alder (Alnus incana subsp. rugosa), Bebb's willow, Missouri River willow, all accompanied by bog-myrtle and sanguisorb from Canada. The driest stations are occupied by white spruce and northern white-cedar.

The islands provide habitat for three rare species in Quebec. The first is Macoun's gentian (Gentianopsis virgata subsp. macounii). It is an annual herbaceous plant that grows on the shores of fresh or brackish water estuaries. This plant is found in Quebec on the coast of James Bay and in Bonaventure. This is the only occurrence of this plant in Gaspésie. We also find Anticosti aster, a herbaceous plant endemic to the Gulf of St. Lawrence and Richardson's muhlenbergie, a riverine plant and limestone plateaus which is only present in about fifteen places in Quebec. There are also twenty-seven other regionally rare species such as Gmelin's buttercup and the marsh aster (Symphyotrichum novi-belgii var. elodes).

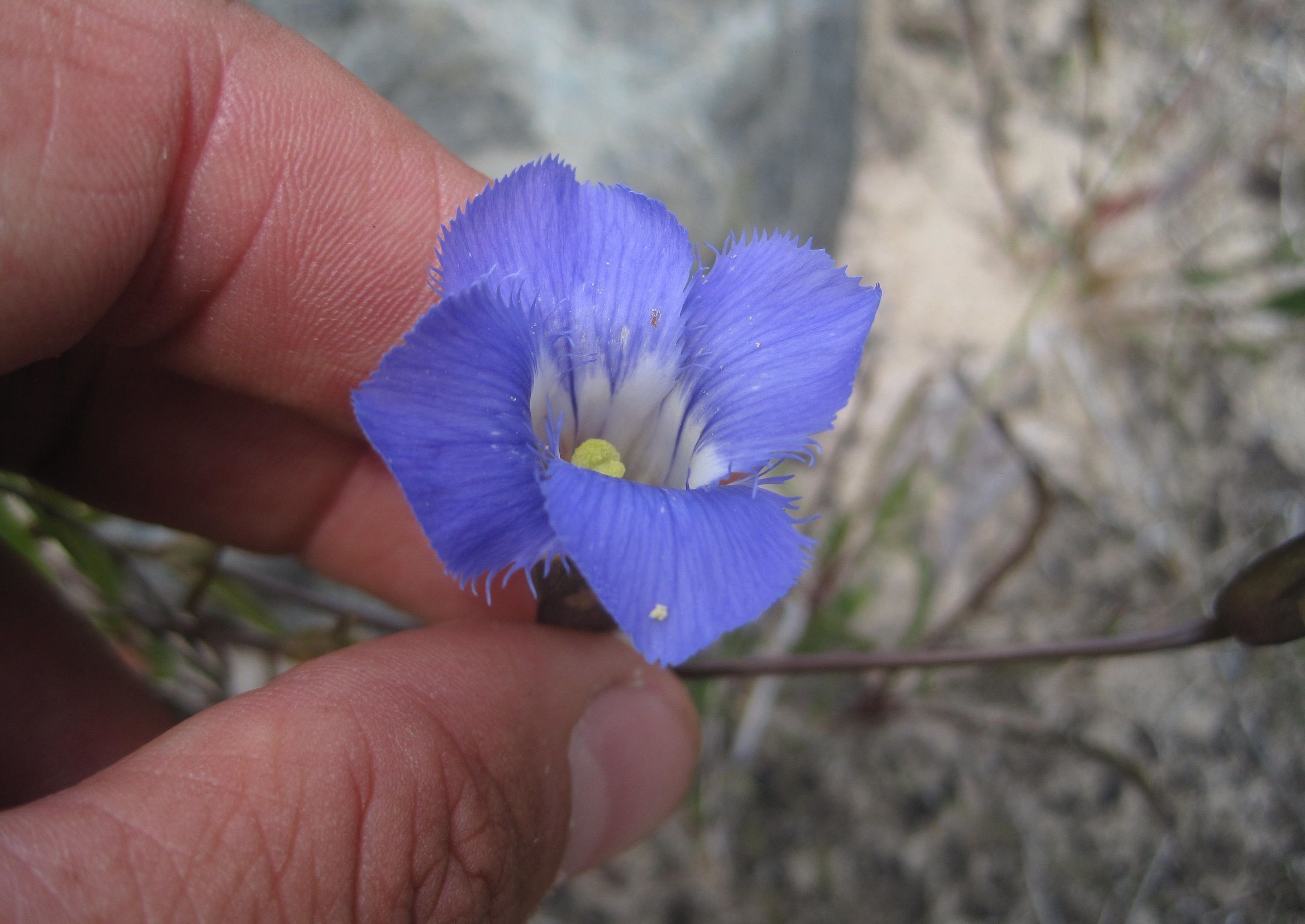
Great gentian, Gentianopsis virgata

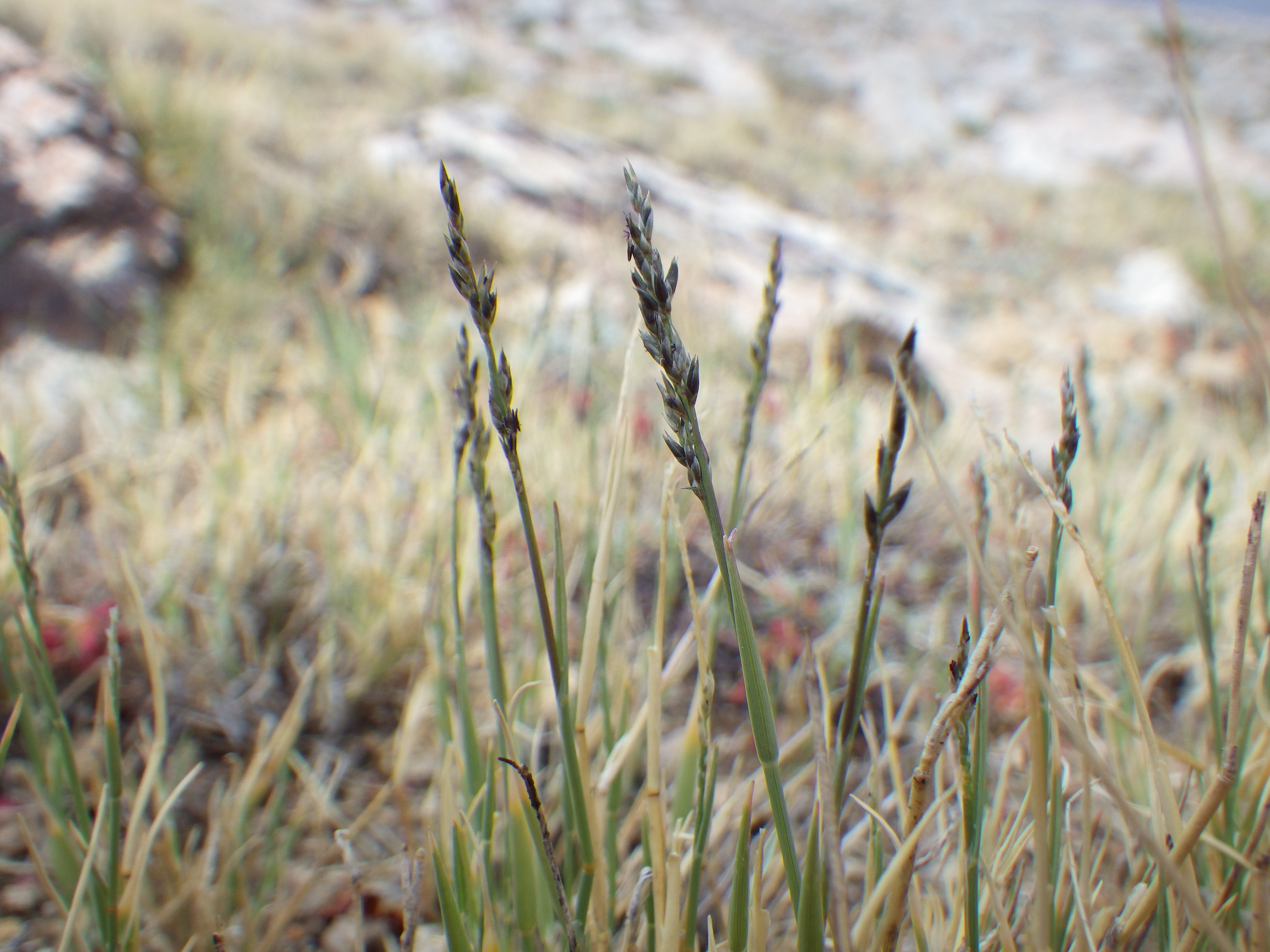
Richardson's Muhlenbergie

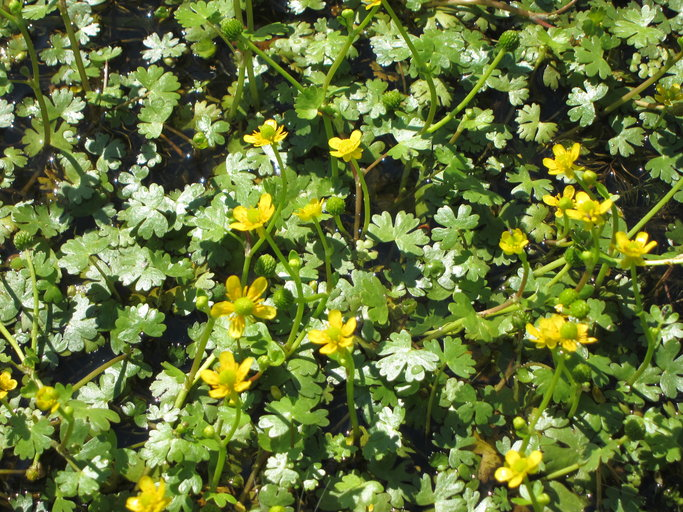
Gmelin buttercup

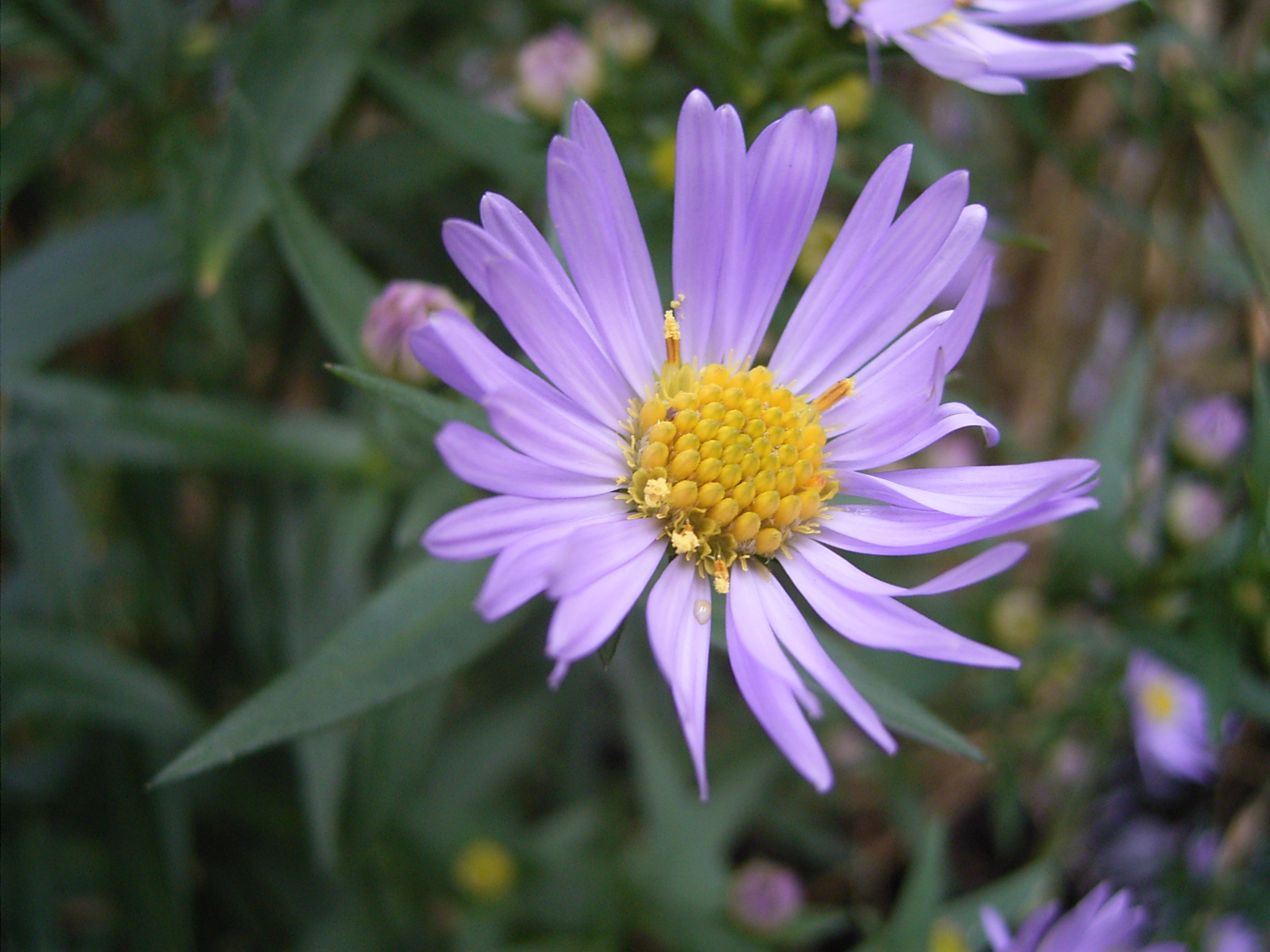
Marsh Aster

The Bonaventure River is frequented by two species of Salmonidae, Atlantic salmon, whose population is estimated at 2500 and brook trout as well as by the rainbow smelt. The river is the most important rainbow smelt spawning ground in Gaspésie.

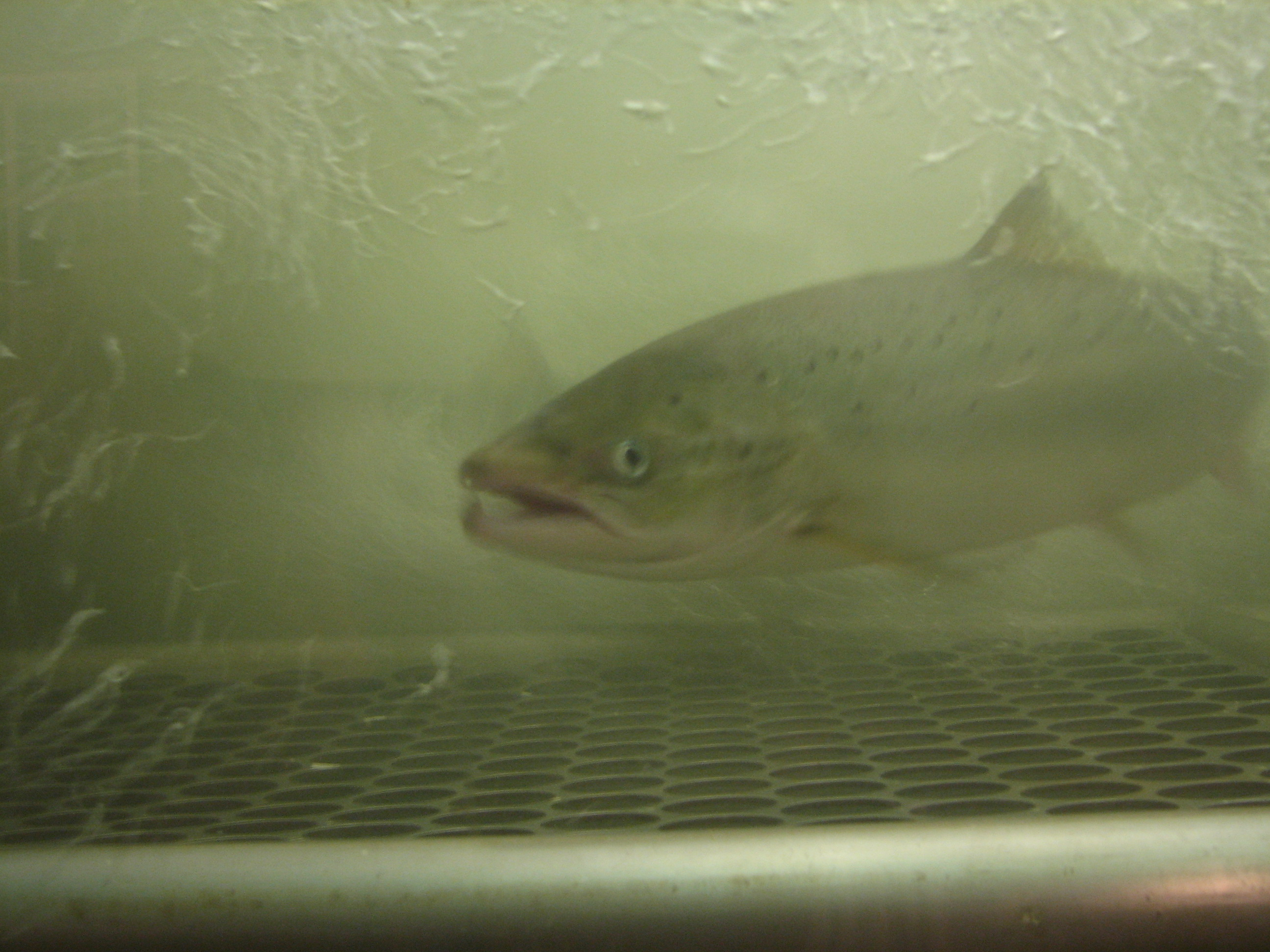
Atlantic salmon

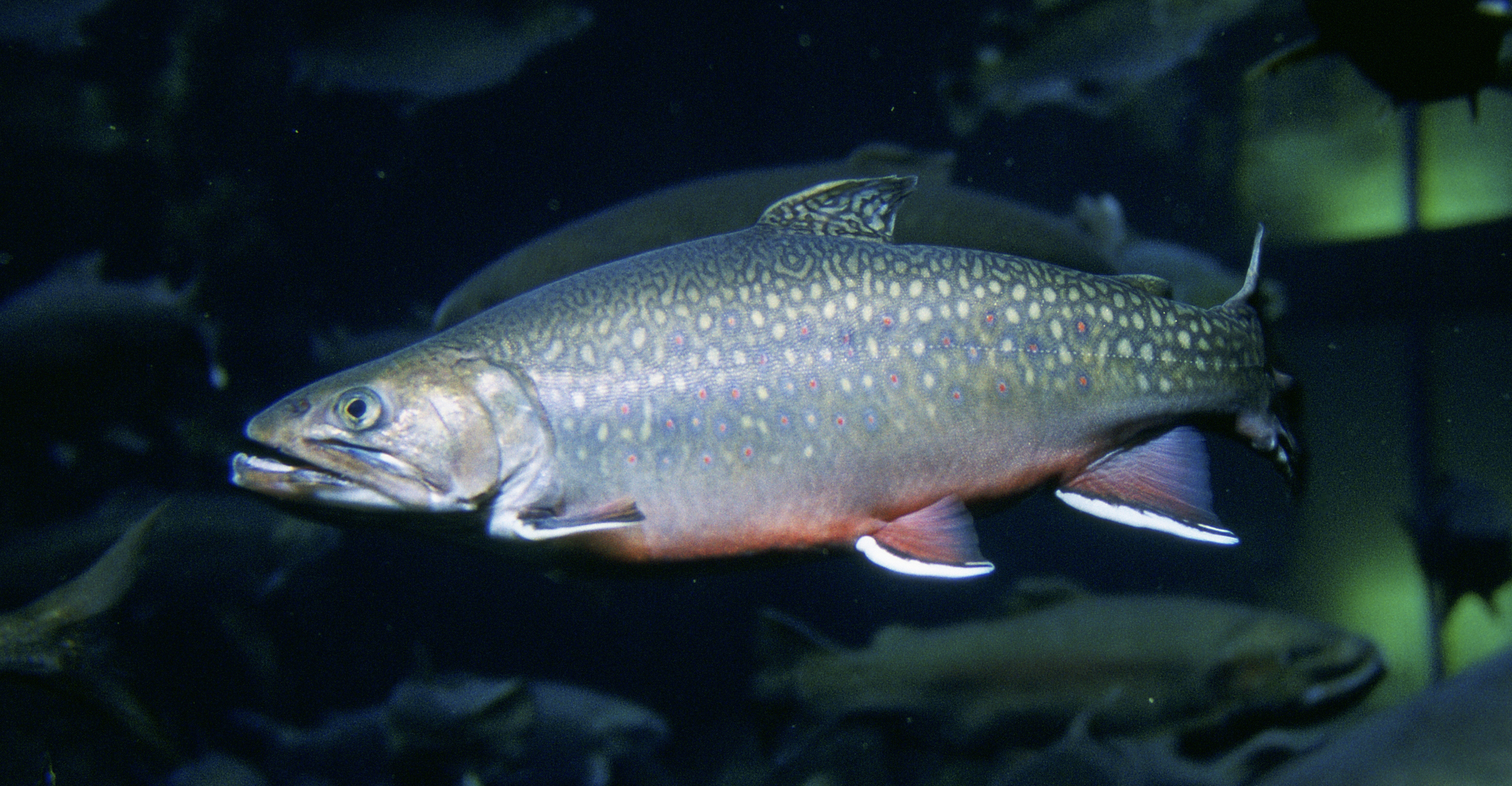
Brook trout

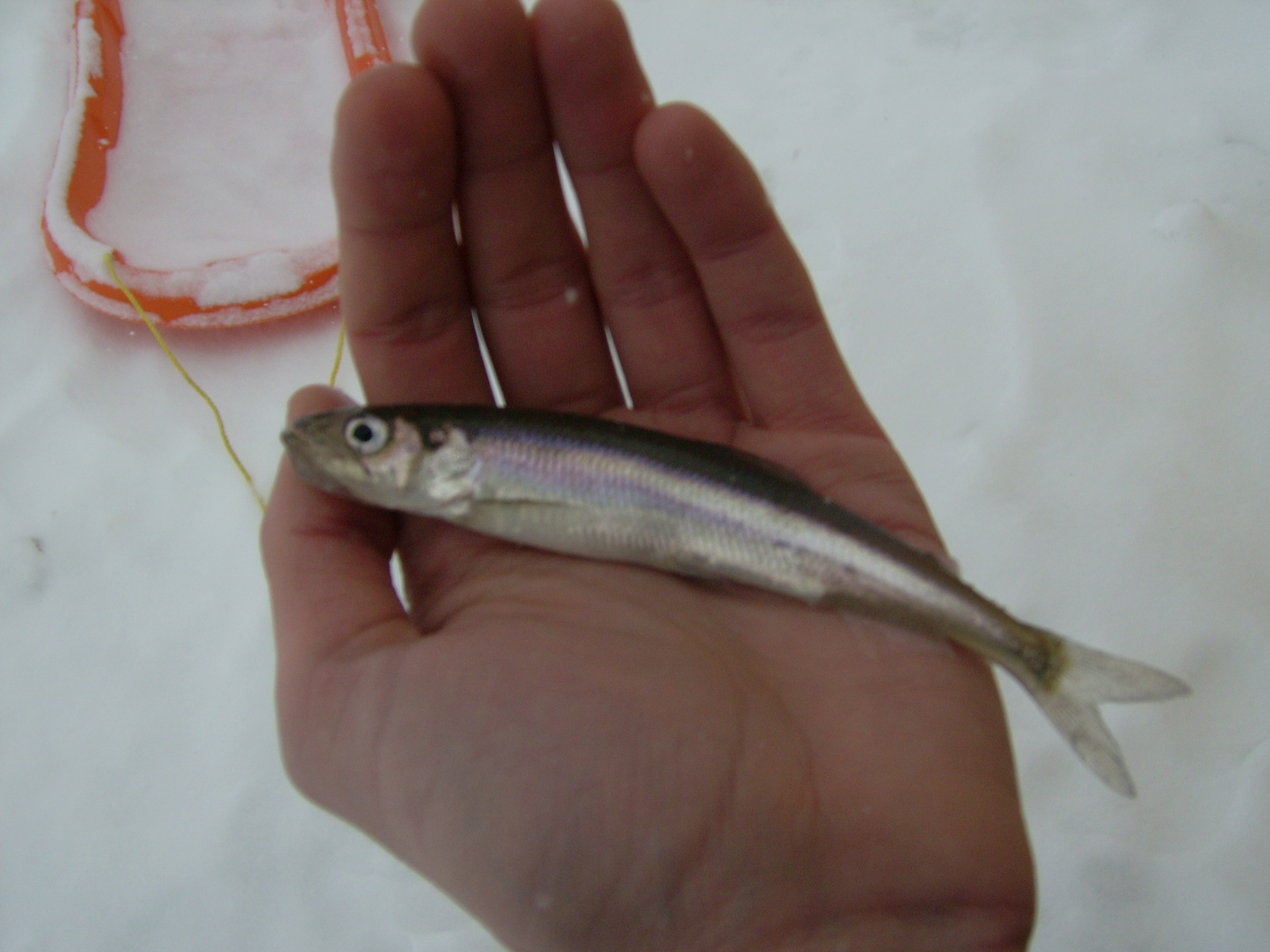
Rainbow smelt

The channel between Arsenault and Des Prés islands is appreciated by bird x in migration period. The most commonly observed migratory bird species are the Canada goose, black duck, mallard and green-winged teal.

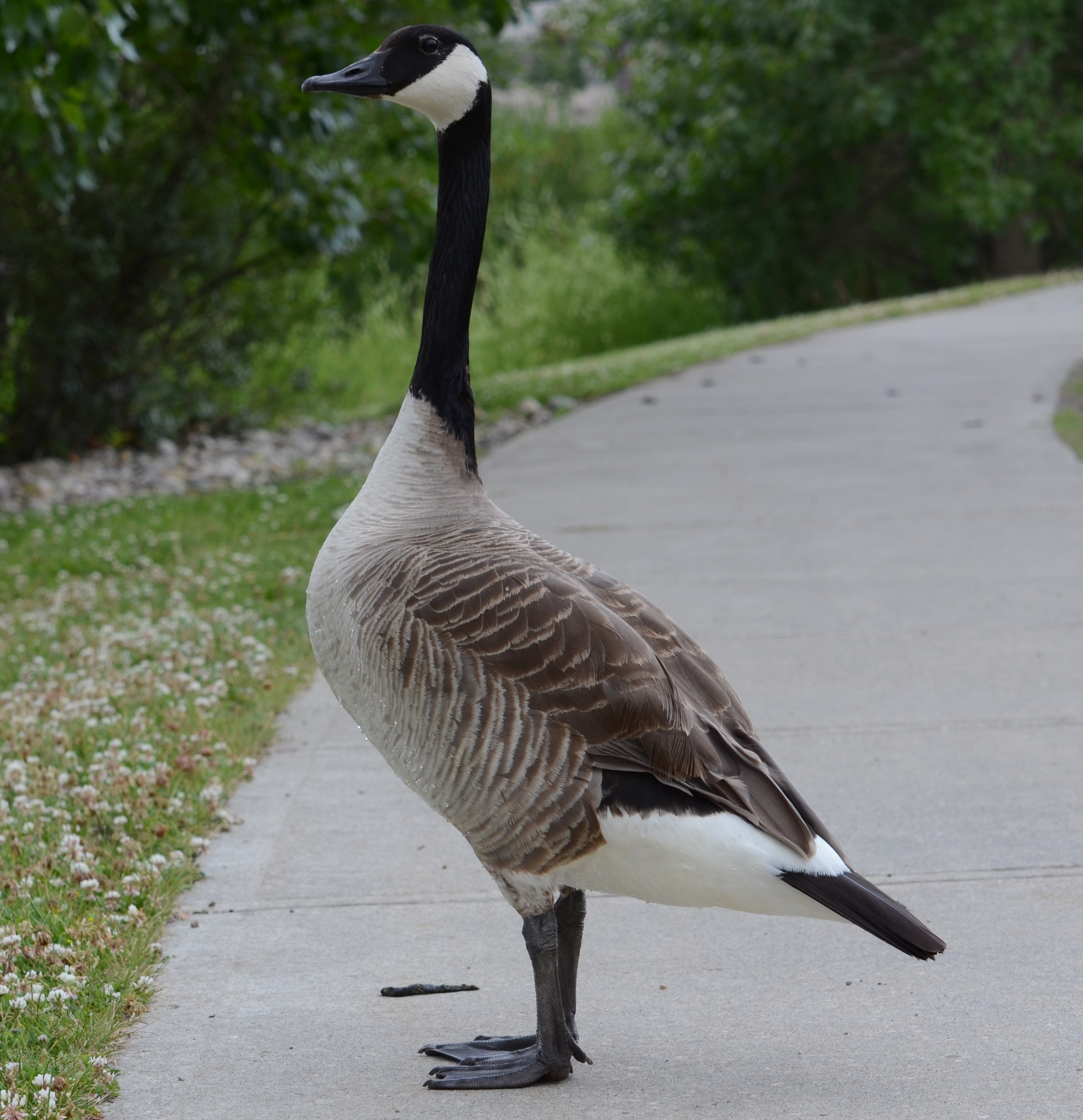
Canada goose

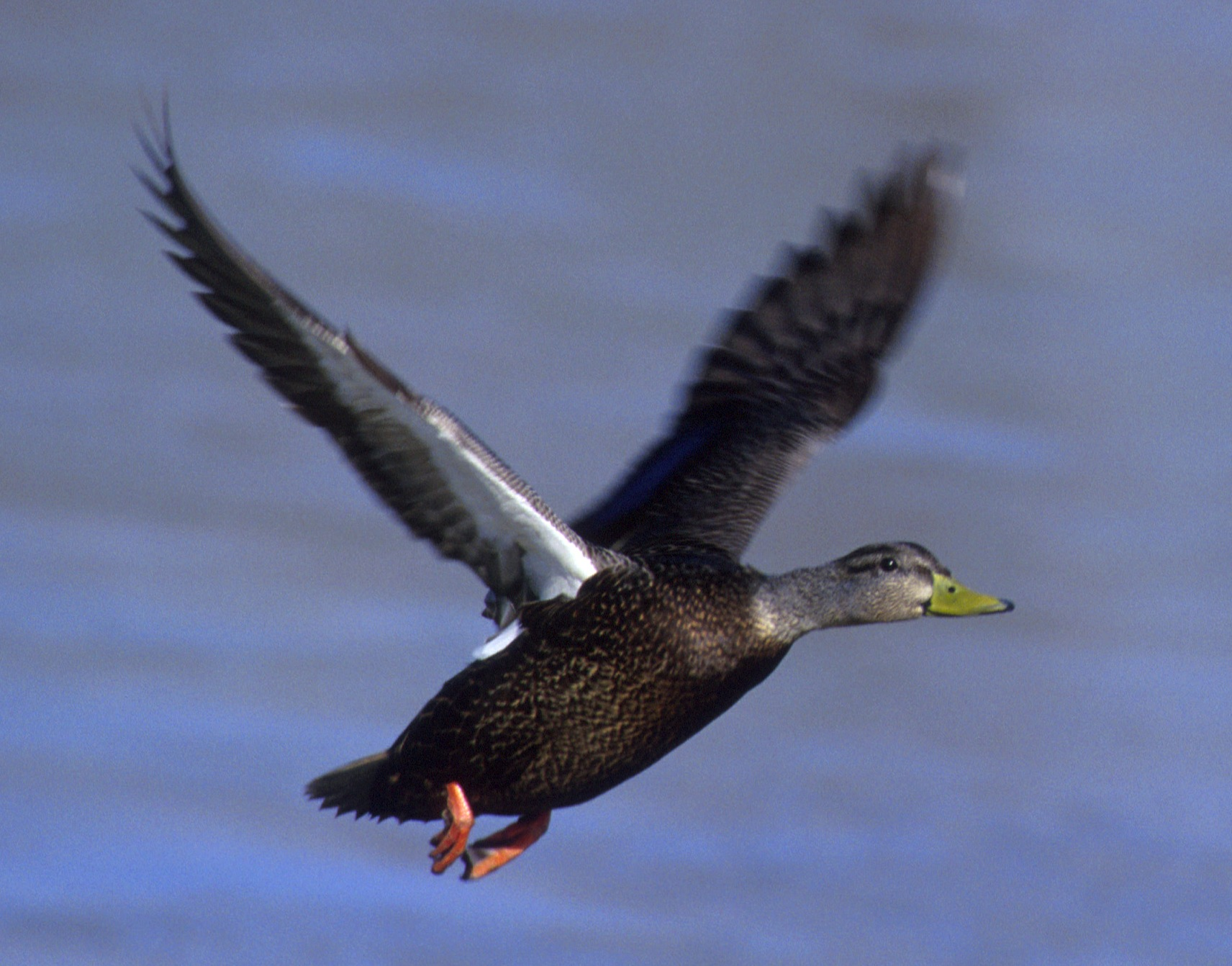
Black duck

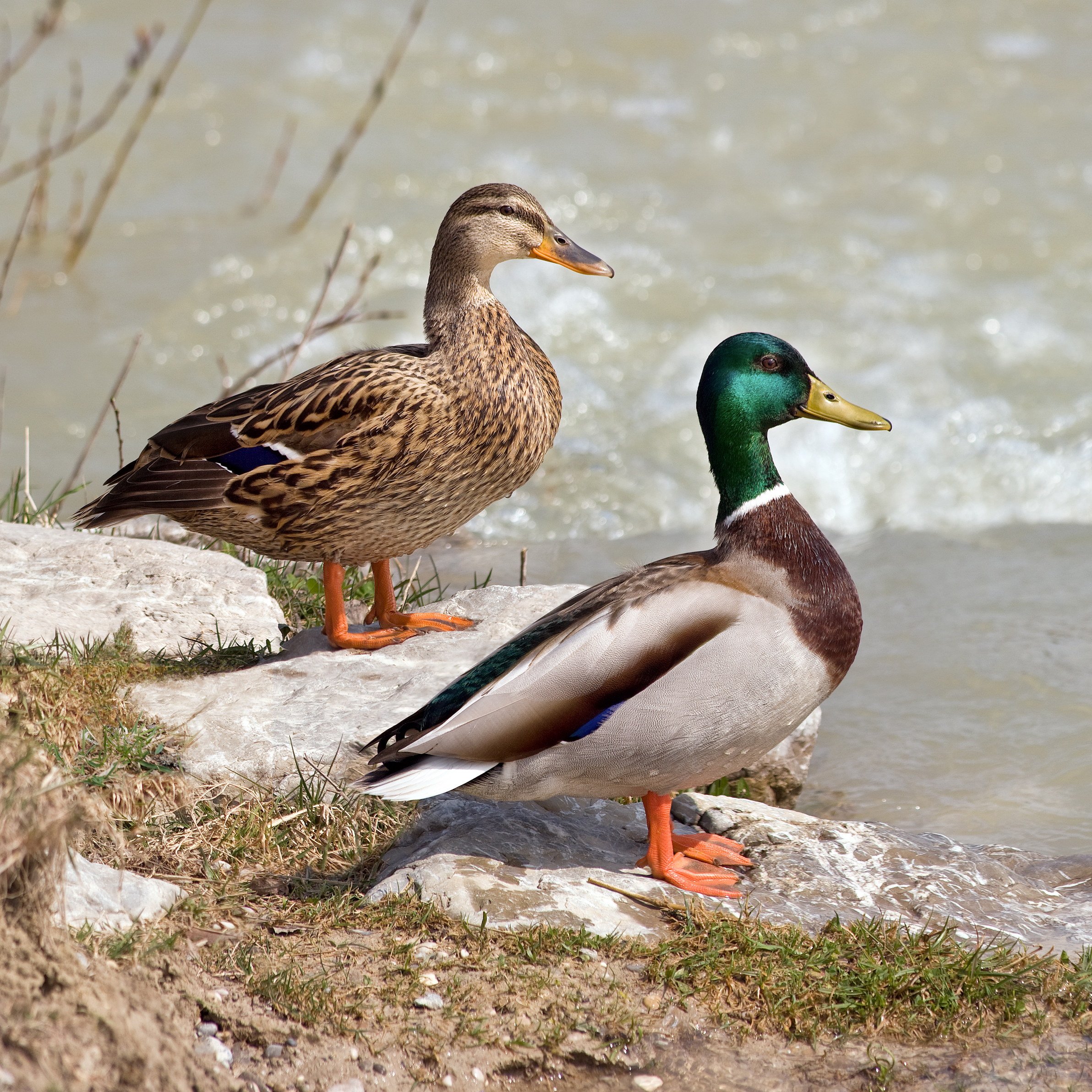
Mallard

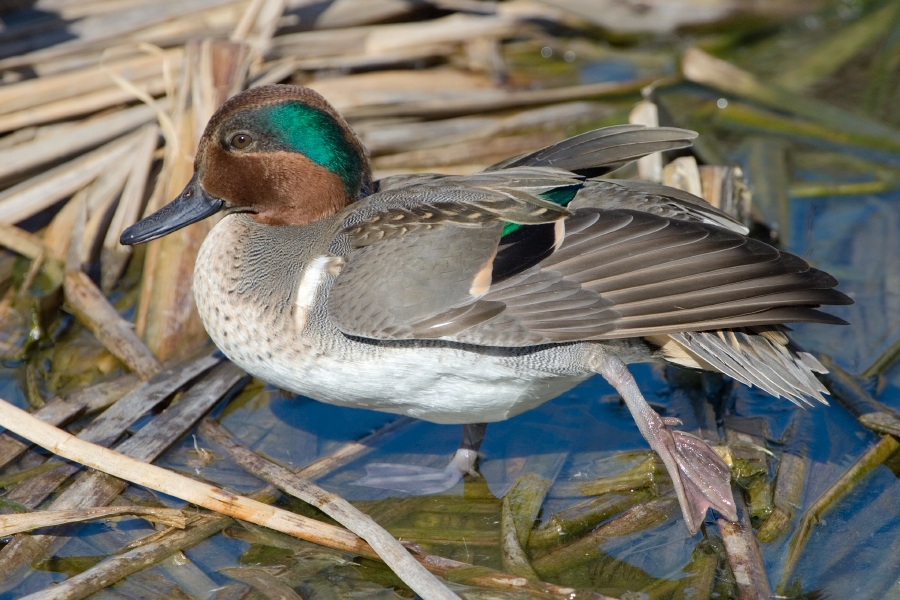
Green-winged teal

=== Lagoon ===
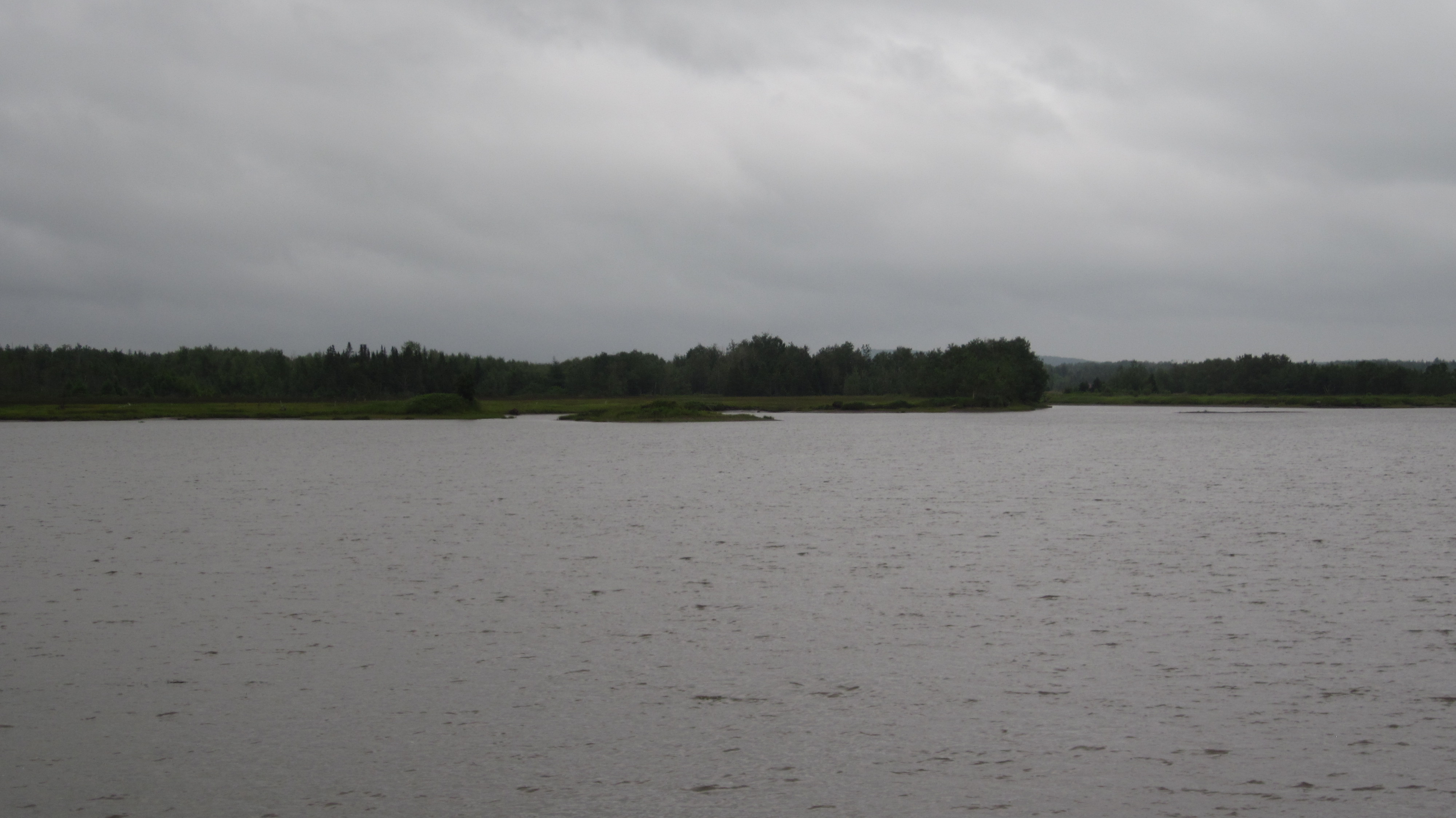
The lagoon view of the village

Eelgrass is the dominant plant in barachois, often accompanied by Ulva intestinalis. The flora of the lagoon also includes Ulva lactuca, beaked tasselweed and horned pondweed. The lagoon is bordered, in places, by salt or brackish marshes. The dominant plants in the marshes are Baltic rush, green sedge, red fescue, prairie cordgrass, New York aster and the Eleocharis uniglumis.

The plankton of the lagoon is composed of copepods and nauplius of crustaceans. The benthos is composed of 14 species, the most common of which are ragworms and minute hydrobia. The lagoon is also occupied by about fifteen species of fish including stickleback, Atlantic silverside, mummichog, little sculpin, American smooth flounder, winter flounder, American eel, rainbow smelt, Atlantic herring and Atlantic herring. The mudflats are visited by several species of birds, shorebirds and web-footed birds. The species at risk in Quebec or Canada are the yellow rail and the red-headed woodpecker. Regionally rare species include the American coot, the little gull, the black-headed gull and the great egret.

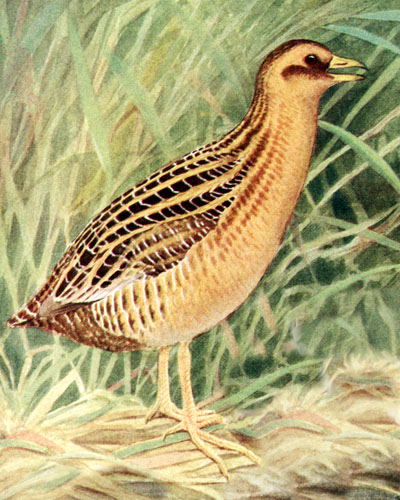
Yellow rail

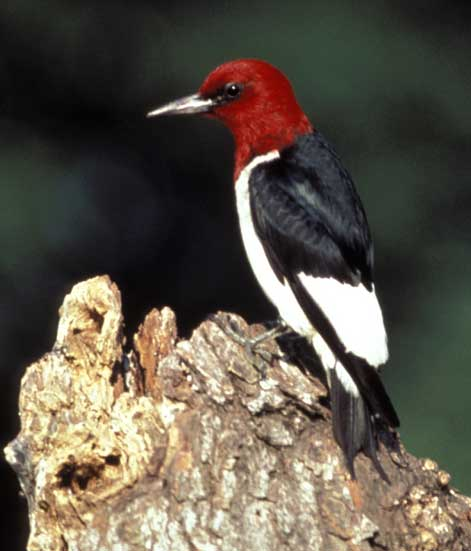
Red-headed woodpecker

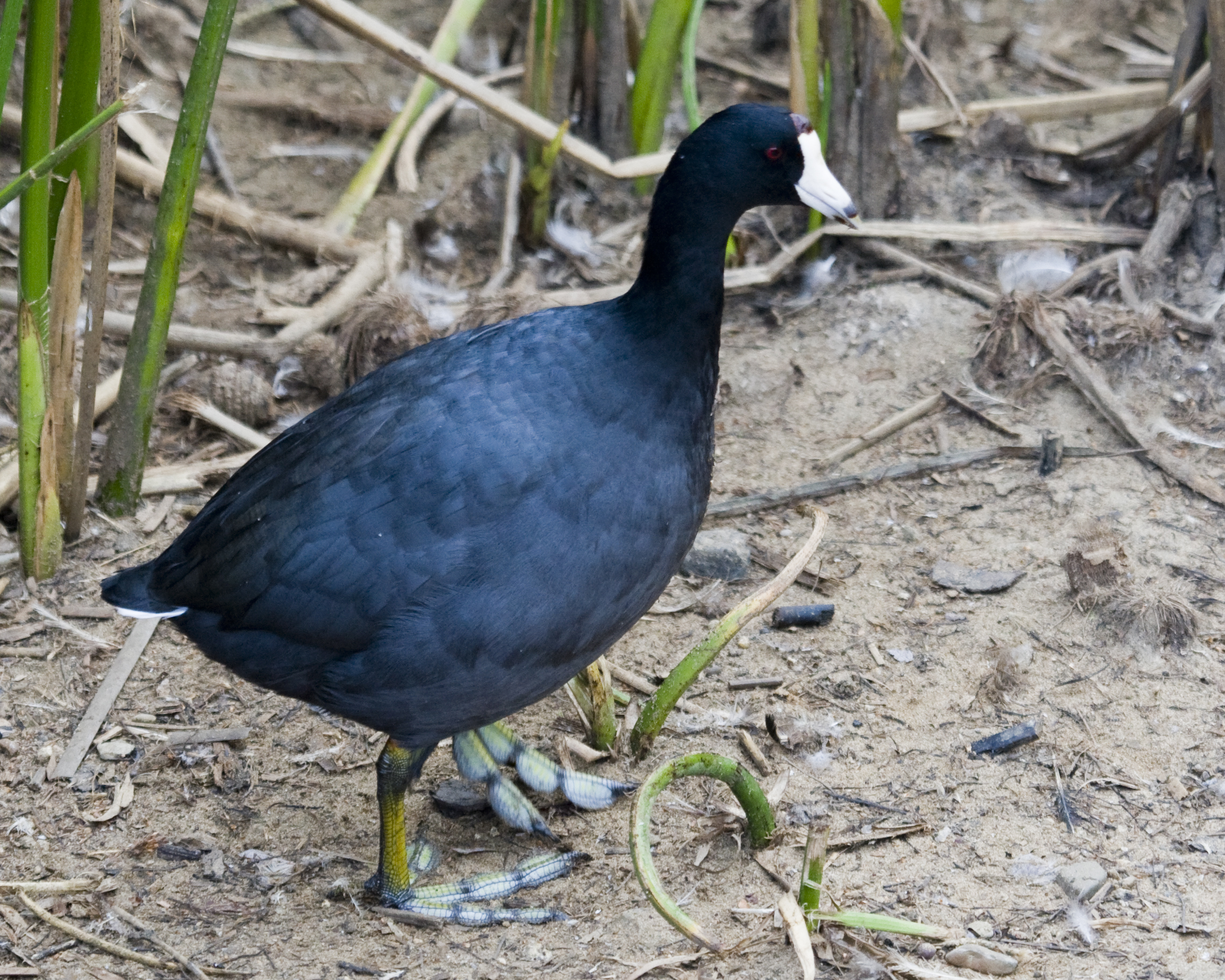
American coot

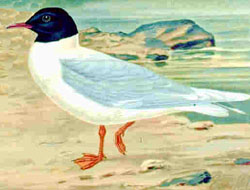
Little gull

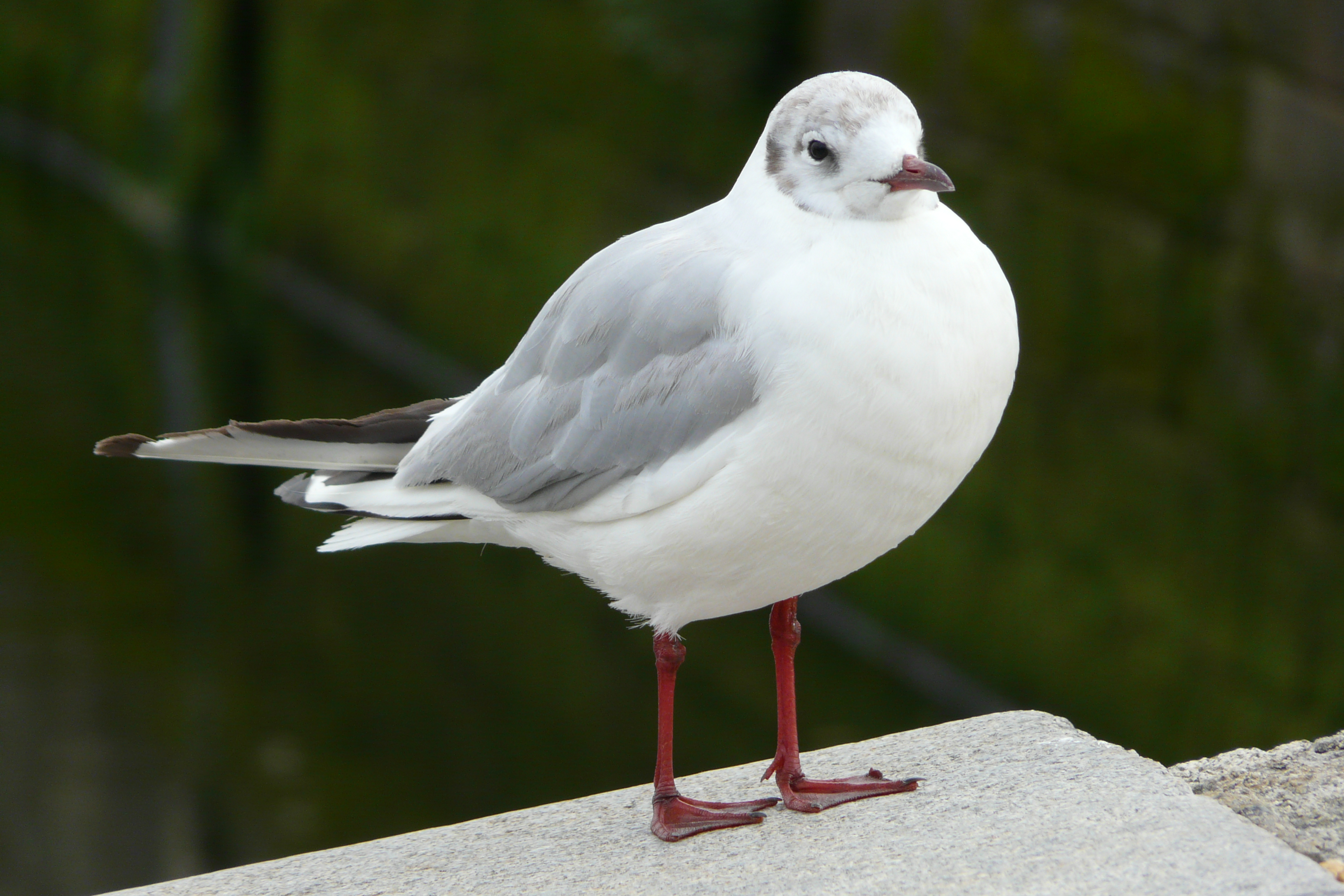
Black-headed gull

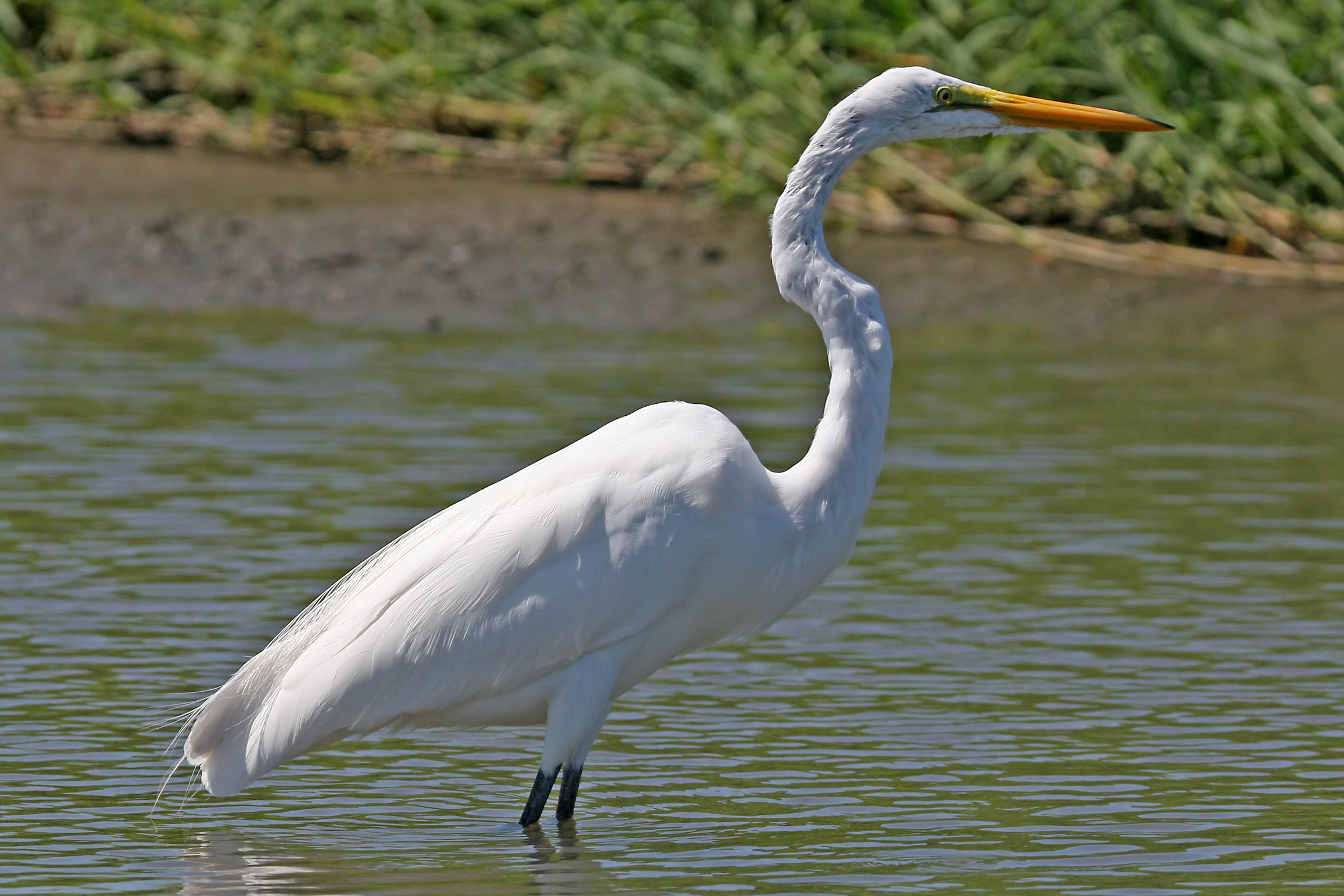
Great egret

Click on images to enlarge

=== Cordon littoral ===
On the eastern spit, the most common plants are American beachgrass, American dune grass, sea pea, common toadflax, pitseed goosefoot, American searocket and sea sandwort. The western spit, which is not part of the reserve, is strongly disturbed and its vegetation is similar to that of the anthropogenic environments. The upper part of the beach is dominated by smooth cordgrass accompanied by Canadian sandspurry, Salicornia virginica, sea plantain and Suaeda maritima. As in case of bay mud, it is dominated by eelgrass. The cordon fauna receives a large number of birds, in particular anatidae and shorebirds.

=== Littoral ===
The vegetation off the spit consists of a large seagrass area consisting eelgrass 5.5 kilometres (3.4 mi) long ranging from Saint-Siméon to Bonaventure and, further on, an underwater prairie of long-stipe kelp. The vegetation of stony bottoms is composed of algae, the main species of which are rockweed, bladder wrack, Irish moss, Agarum clathratum, Ascophyllum and dulse.

The coastal waters of Bonaventure are home to many species of invertebrates, including blue mussel, soft-shell clam, Atlantic deep-sea scallop, Iceland scallop, green sea urchin, common periwinkle, common starfish, opilio crab and American lobster. The seagrass beds provide refuge for the Atlantic rock crab, Crangon septemspinosa and marine worms. Among the 30 species of fish recorded are the Atlantic tomcod and American eel. The coastline is an important staging area for water and shorebirds. The Barrow's Goldeneye has already been observed there, considered to be a vulnerable species in Canada. A few marine mammals visit the site, including northern minke whale, fin whale, harbor seal, gray seal and harbor porpoise.

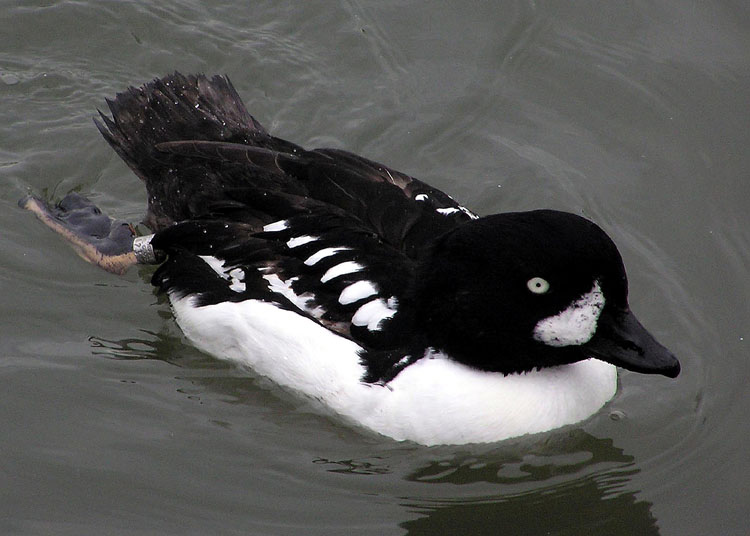
Barrow's Goldeneye

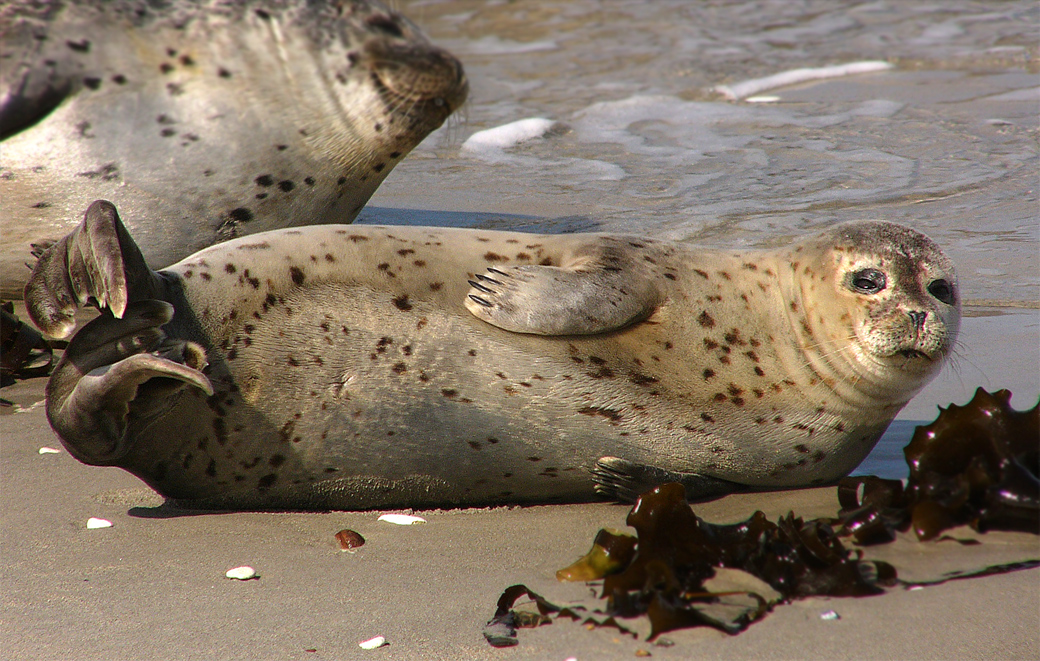
Harbor seal

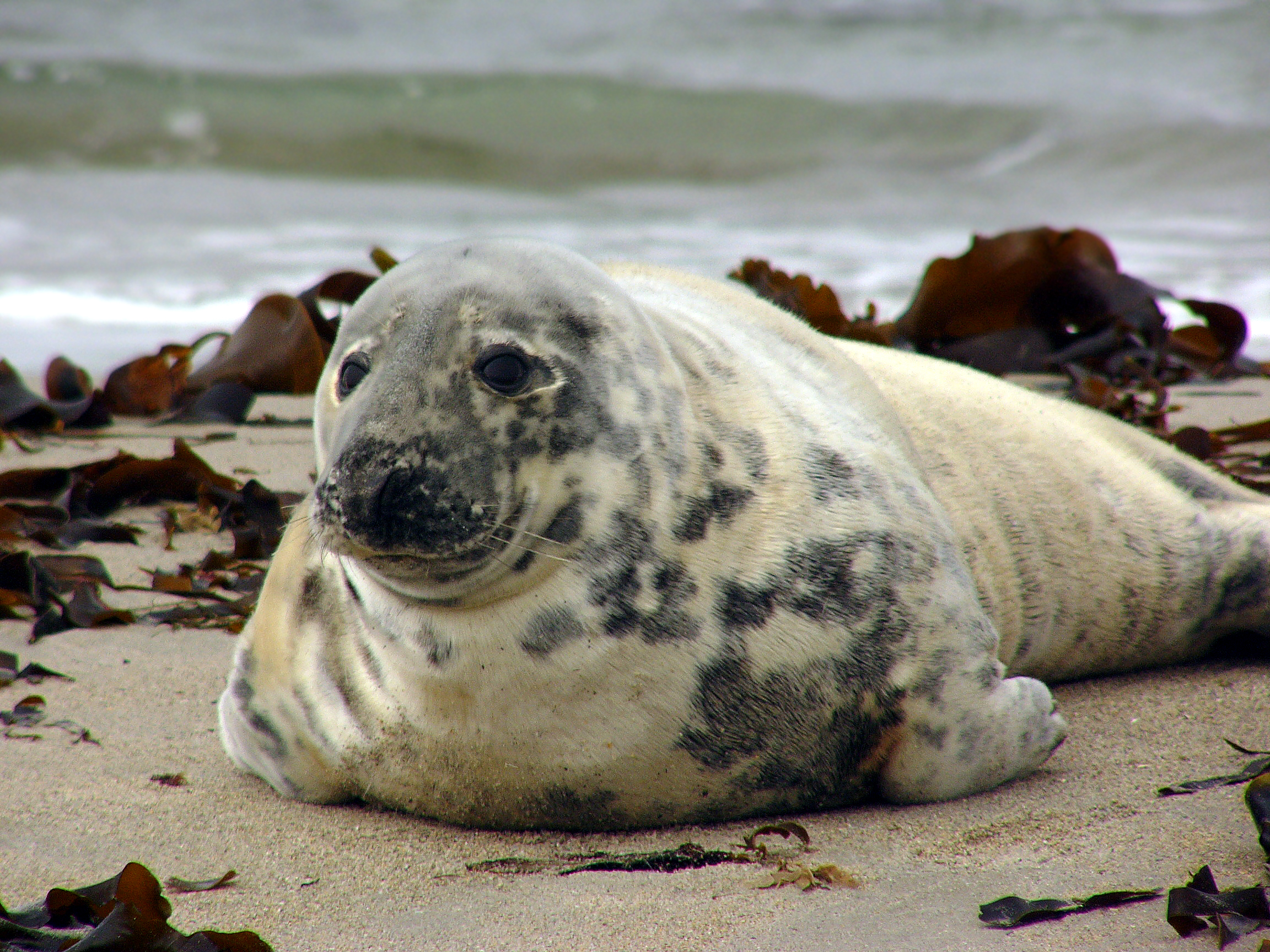
Gray seal

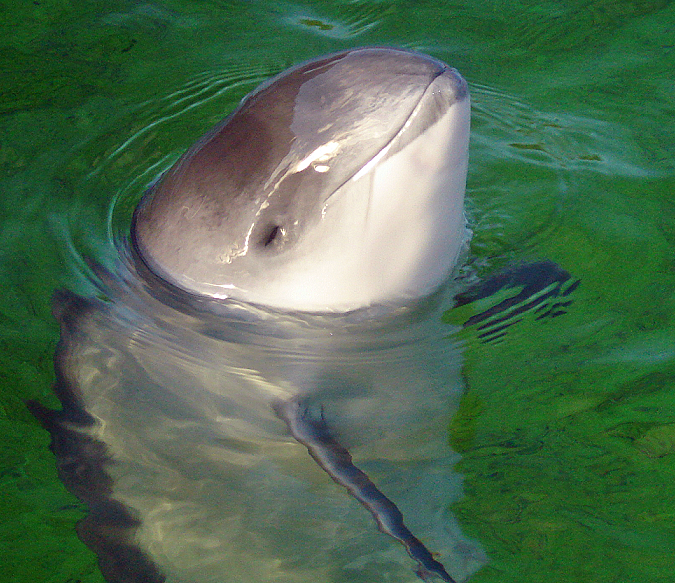
Harbor porpoise

== History ==
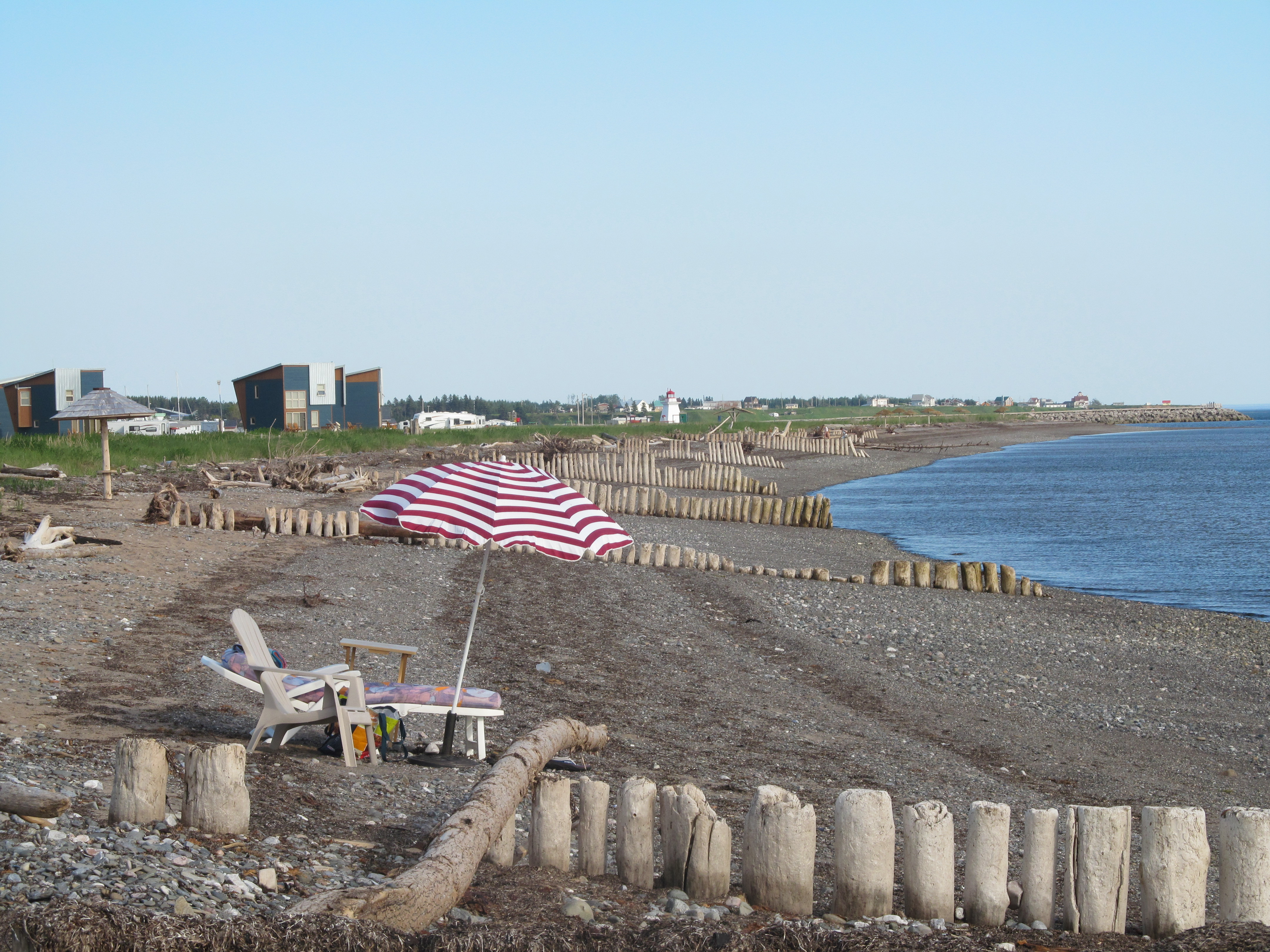
Beaubassin beach, excluded from the protected area

The first developments of the estuary were carried out from the end of the 19th century and during the 1960s, with the construction of the timber flotation channel feeding a sawmill. Subsequently, the construction of the causeway of the route 132, port facilities and a marina, greatly disrupted water circulation as well as the lagoon sedimentation processes. To remedy this, the causeway was pierced with a culvert and the jetty, connecting route 132 to the Pointe de Beaubassin, was dismantled.

The origin of the reserve comes from an ecological gift from the Smurfit-Stone Container Corporation to the government of Quebec, in 2001. In 2005, all of the estuary islands were included in the Barachois-de-Bonaventure plant habitat. On 7 September of the same year, the territory of the reserve obtained the status of "proposed aquatic reserve". The ministry entrusted to the Bureau d'audiences publiques sur l'environnement (BAPE), in July 2006, the mandate to carry out public consultations, in order to give a permanent status to the aquatic reserve and the Karst-de-Saint-Elzéar Biodiversity Reserve. Sessions were held in September and October of the same year and the report was published in February 2007. The BAPE recommended removing two portions of the initial project: the beach on the sand spit of Beaubassin, because of its intensive use, and the basin between the Bonaventure marina and the route 132, because of the dredging works which maintain navigation towards the fishing port and the marina. These two withdrawals were accepted by the ministry and excluded from the reserve, which obtained its permanent status on 15 April 2009.

== Activity ==
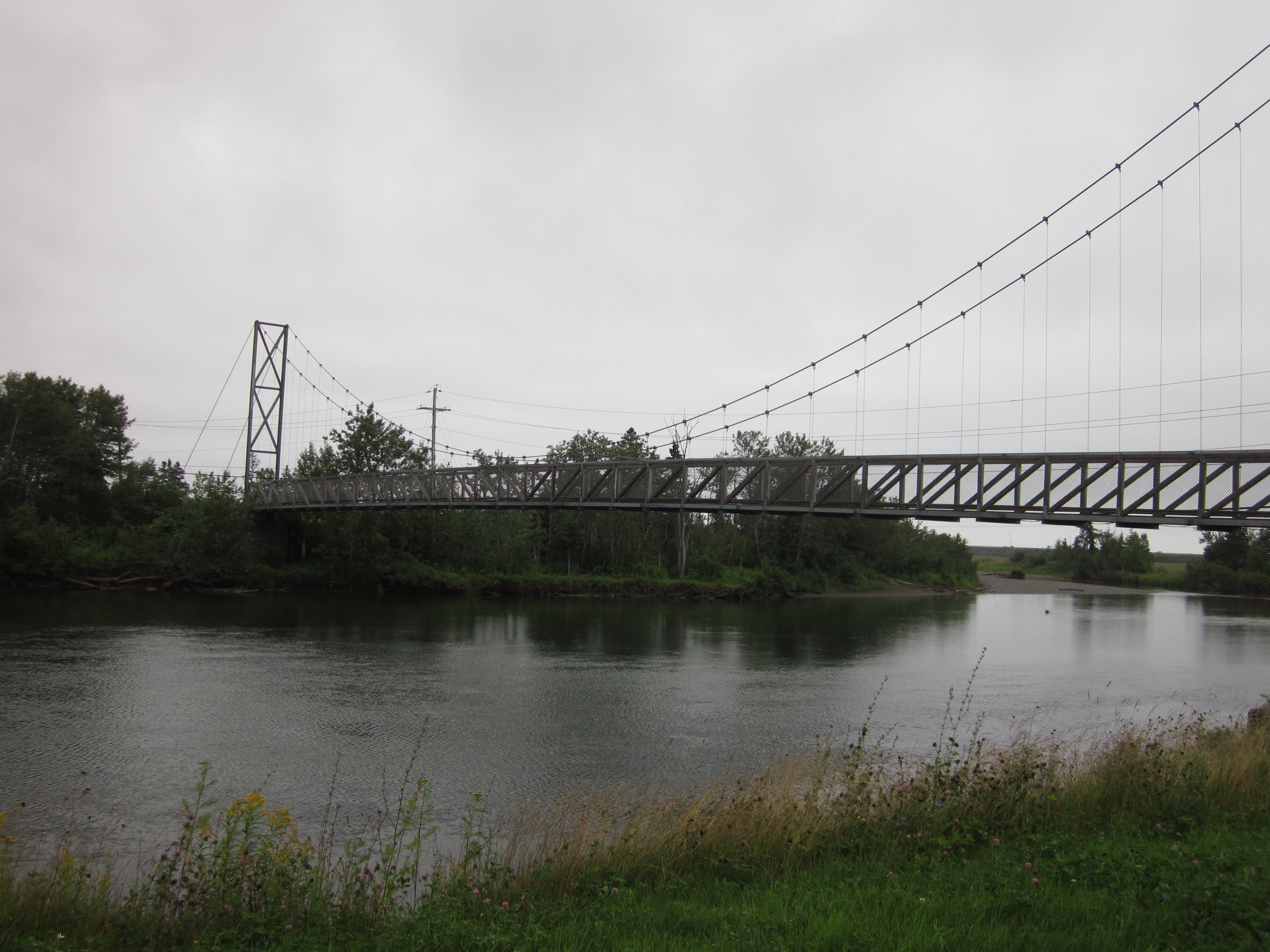
Bridge on the hiking trail crossing the reserve

The reserve, administered by the Ministry of Sustainable Development, Environment, and Fight Against Climate Change, has no infrastructure. Access to Île aux Pirates, via the Cap-de-Sable road, is one kilometer southeast of the Vieux-Ponts road on route 132. Boats can also dock there. A hiking trail crosses the reserve at the level of the old route 6. A tourist stop located at the Acadian Museum of Quebec offers a point of view on the barachois. Unlike National Parks of Quebec, hunting and fishing are tolerated but, since 2012, the installation of ice fishing huts has been subject to authorization due to the incidents observed in 2011.

== See also ==
- Zec de la Rivière-Bonaventure
- Protected areas of Quebec

== Bibliography ==
- Government of Quebec (2009). Conservation plan, Estuaire-de-la-Rivière-Bonaventure aquatic reserve (PDF). Quebec. p. 27. plan.
- Office of public hearings on the environment (2006). Projects for the Saint-Elzéar karst biodiversity reserve and the aquatic reserve of the Bonaventure River estuary - Investigation and public hearing report (no. 234) (PDF). Quebec. p. 62. ISBN 978-2-550-48725-8. projects.
