= Zec de la Rivière-Bonaventure =

- Location within Quebec
- Location: Canada, Quebec, Bonaventure Regional County Municipality
- Nearest city: Bonaventure
- Coordinates: 48°26′00″N 65°30′00″W
- Area: Length of 199 kilometres (124 mi)
- Established: 1980

Zec de la Rivière-Bonaventure is a "zone d'exploitation contrôlée" (controlled harvesting zone) (ZEC) located in the non organized territory of Rivière-Bonaventure, in Bonaventure Regional County Municipality, in the administrative region Gaspésie-Îles-de-la-Madeleine, Québec, Canada. The economy of the zec is mainly based on recreational salmon fishing.

== Geography ==
With a length of 199 kilometres (124 mi), this zec is the longest salmon zec in province of Quebec; the next one in term of length is zec de la Rivière-Sainte-Marguerite which is located on north of Saguenay River.

Zec Rivière-Bonaventure is located at centre-south of Gaspésie peninsula. This long protected area on Bonaventure River and its tributary the Bonaventure Ouest River, look like a narrow ribbon on all the course. This zec is on public domain at 78% and the rest is on private property.

The Bonaventure River takes its source at south of the municipality of Murdochville, i.e. at around 10 km at north of Bonaventure lake (length: 1,2 km) in Chic-Choc Mountains, at 487 m of altitude, in Gaspésie National Park. Its main tributary of West bank is Bonaventure Ouest River, at 183 m of altitude; and Garin River on East bank. Bonaventure River flows straight toward South 125 km and empties in Chaleur Bay (Baie des Chaleurs), in large bay of Bonaventure where many islands are located in the estuary. The zec operate a river segment of about 65 km on this river for recreative salmon fishing.

The zec is easily accessible by road through "chemin Garin", from route 132 which goes along the Chaleur Bay (Baie des Chaleurs), up to kilometer 65, i.e. at the mouth of Bonaventure Ouest River (also commonly designated "Big Ouest"). Upstream from this point, there is a forested road between kilometer 65 to 115, which less accessible, and the navigation also because of the slope of the river.

== Salmon fishing ==
This river is characterized by cold waters of exceptional clarity, a key factor in ensuring good conditions for salmon fishing. The clarity of the water is caused by the fact that the river flows over a rocky bottom, in places with stones and pebbles.

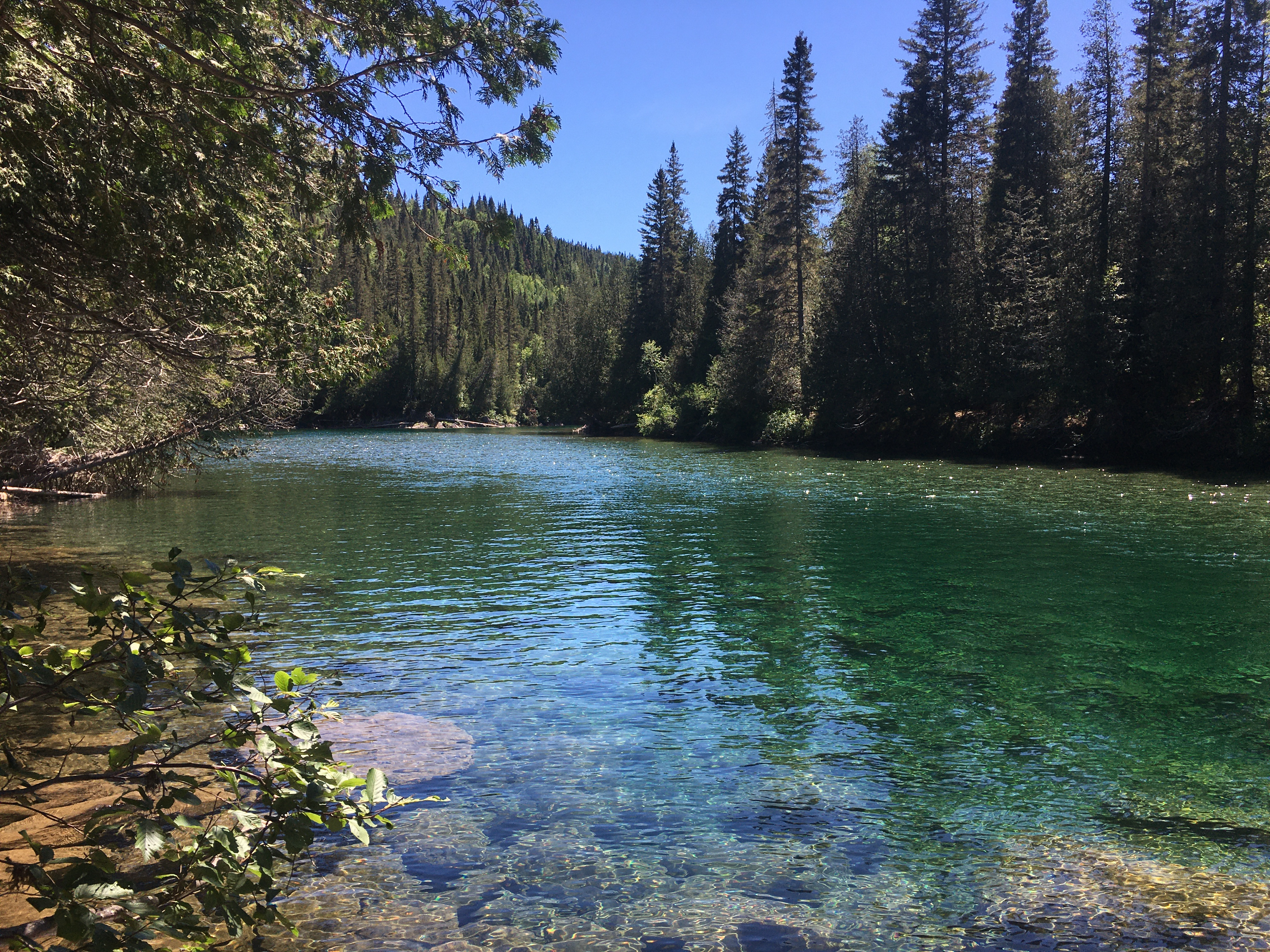
Bonaventure River

The economy of the recreational salmon fishery is under the auspices of two organizations that share the exploitation of the salmon resource: "l'Association des pêcheurs sportifs de la Bonaventure" and "Le Club de pêche au saumon « Le Canadien »".

In the territory of the ZEC, many water pits are caught fording. However, in case of high flood waters, the use of a boat river is of prime importance. The waters of the Bonaventure River are inhabited by seven species of fish (listed in order of importance): the salmon, the brook trout, the American eel, the red miller, the stickleback, the rainbow smelt rainbow and black dace.

Annually, more than 20,000 boaters go downstream using riverboat (non-motorized), canoes, kayaks ... The river was a constant flow of water and offers rapids of class I to III.

== Toponymy ==
According to the Commission de toponymie du Quebec (Geographical Names Board of Quebec), the term "Bonaventure" appears in 73 names on the territory of the Quebec. Several names "Bonaventure" are associated together in the same sector: Zec, the "unorganized territory", the lake, the river, the river west and the city of Bonaventure city.

The name "River Bonaventure" is interconnected to four names of the same origin and which are entities in the same sector of the Gaspésie: the zone d'exploitation contrôlée (controlled harvesting zone) (ZEC), the "unorganized territory" (TNO), the municipality and the hamlet. The name Zec de la Rivière-Bonaventure has been formalized on August 5, 1982 at the Bank of place names in the Commission de toponymie du Québec (Geographical Names Board of Quebec).

== See also ==
- Chaleur Bay (Baie des Chaleurs)
- Gaspésie
- Gaspésie National Park
- Rivière-Bonaventure, unorganized territory
- Bonaventure River, river emptying in Chaleur Bay (Baie des Chaleurs)
- Barachois, coastal lagoon separated from the ocean by a sand or shingle bar
- Zone d'exploitation contrôlée (controlled harvesting zone) (ZEC)
