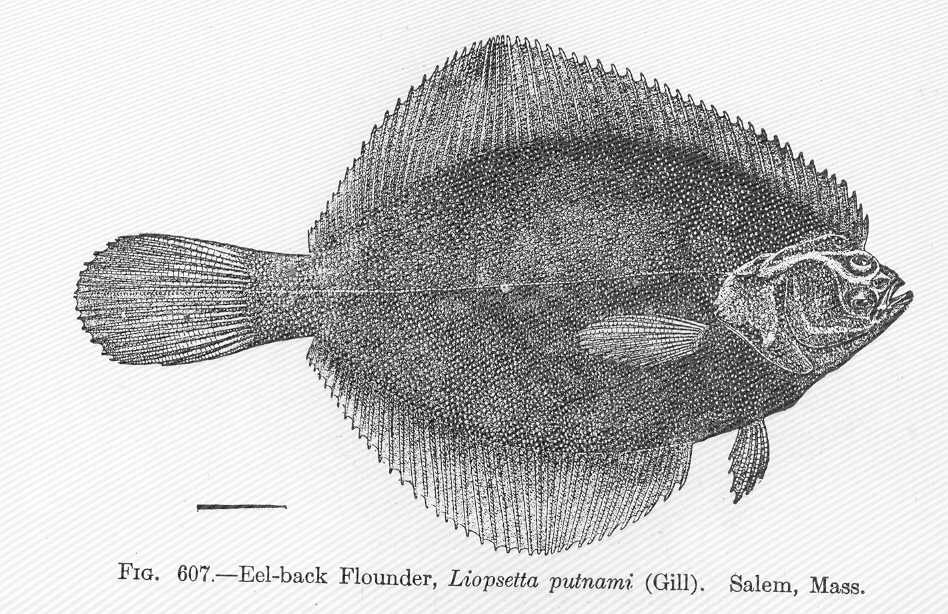

Scientific classification
- Kingdom: Animalia
- Phylum: Chordata
- Class: Actinopterygii
- Order: Carangiformes
- Suborder: Pleuronectoidei
- Family: Pleuronectidae
- Genus: Pleuronectes
- Species: P. putnami

Binomial name
- Pleuronectes putnami (Gill, 1864)
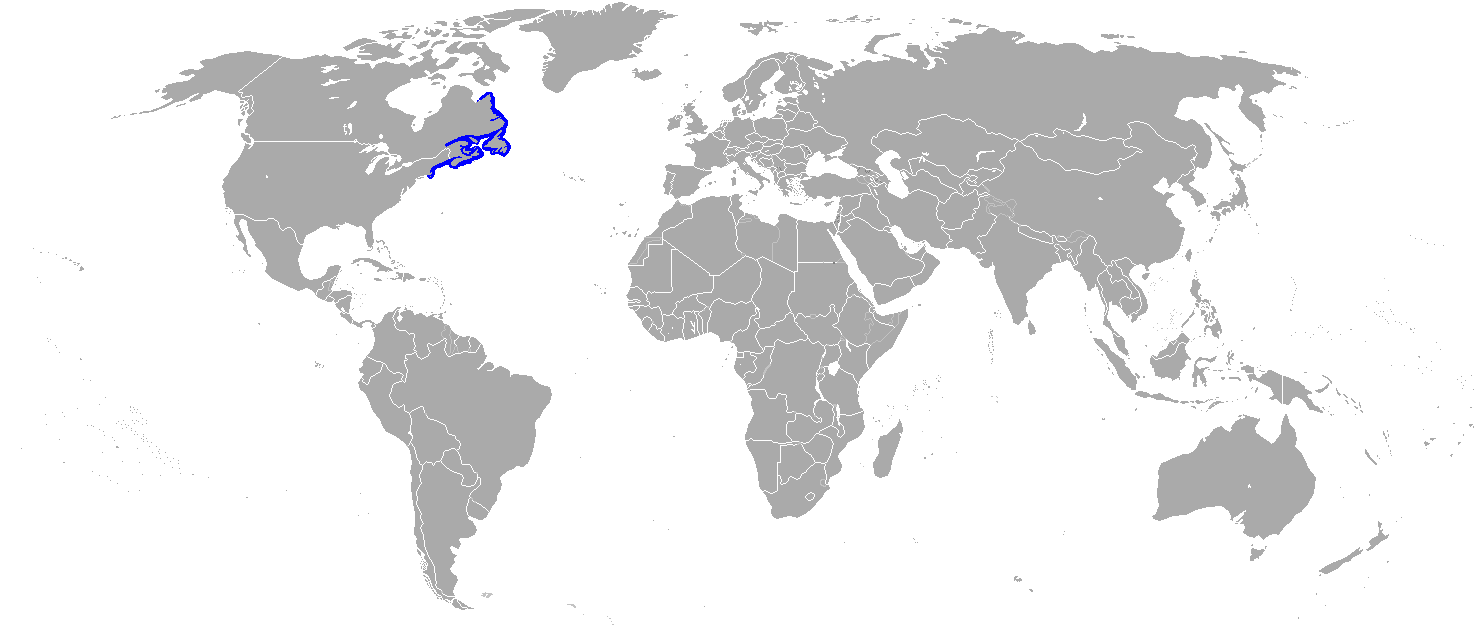
- Distribution of American smooth flounder

Synonyms
- Euchalarodus putnami Gill, 1864; Limanda putnami (Gill, 1864); Liopsetta putnami (Gill, 1864)

= American smooth flounder =

Species of fish

The American smooth flounder (Pleuronectes putnami) is a flatfish of the family Pleuronectidae. It is a demersal fish that inhabits shallow inshore salt and brackish waters at depths of up to 27 metres (89 ft). Its native habitat is the temperate waters of the northwestern Atlantic, from Ungava Bay in Quebec, Canada to Rhode Island, United States. It can grow up to 30 centimetres (12 in) in length.

== Description ==
The American smooth flounder is a right-eyed flatfish, resembling the winter flounder in shape and appearance. Its upper side, including the fins, ranges in colour from dark grey to brown or almost black, and may be either uniform or mottled with darker patches of the same colour; its underside is white. Females are smooth on both sides of the body, whilst males are rough on the upper side.

== Range and habitat ==
The American smooth flounder inhabits the shallow salt and brackish arctic-boreal waters of the northwestern Atlantic, living inshore on the soft mud bottoms of estuaries, river mouths and sheltered bays. Its range stretches along the Canada–US coast from Quebec through Newfoundland and Labrador, Nova Scotia, Prince Edward Island, Maine, New Hampshire and Massachusetts to Rhode Island.

== Diet ==
The diet of the American smooth flounder consists mainly of zoobenthos invertebrates such as crustaceans, molluscs and marine worms.
