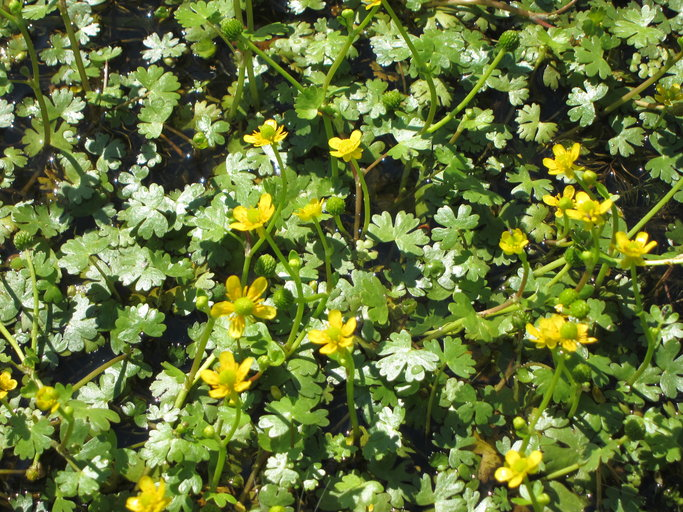

Conservation status
- Secure (NatureServe)

Scientific classification
- Kingdom: Plantae
- Clade: Embryophytes
- Clade: Tracheophytes
- Clade: Angiosperms
- Clade: Eudicots
- Order: Ranunculales
- Family: Ranunculaceae
- Genus: Ranunculus
- Species: R. gmelinii

Binomial name
- Ranunculus gmelinii DC.

Synonyms
- Ranunculus limosus Nutt. Ranunculus purshii Richardson

= Ranunculus gmelinii =

Species of flowering plant

Ranunculus gmelinii, Gmelin's buttercup or small yellow water-crowfoot, is a species of flowering plant in the buttercup family, Ranunculaceae. It is native to northern North America, where it occurs across Canada and the northern and higher-elevation regions of the United States. It is also present in Eurasia.

This species is a perennial herb growing prostrate stems on moist ground or floating stems in shallow water. It is hairy to hairless. The leaf blades are round or kidney-shaped and are divided into three parts that may be subdivided. The yellow petals are 4 to 14 millimeters long. Ranunculus gmelinii occurs in wetland habitats and on shorelines.

The plant is not a threatened species, but it becomes rare in the habitat on the edges of its range; it is protected as a threatened plant in the state of Maine, and var. hookeri is a state-listed endangered plant in Wisconsin. It is listed as an endangered species in Newfoundland and Labrador.

This species was named in honor of Johann Georg Gmelin (1709-1755).
