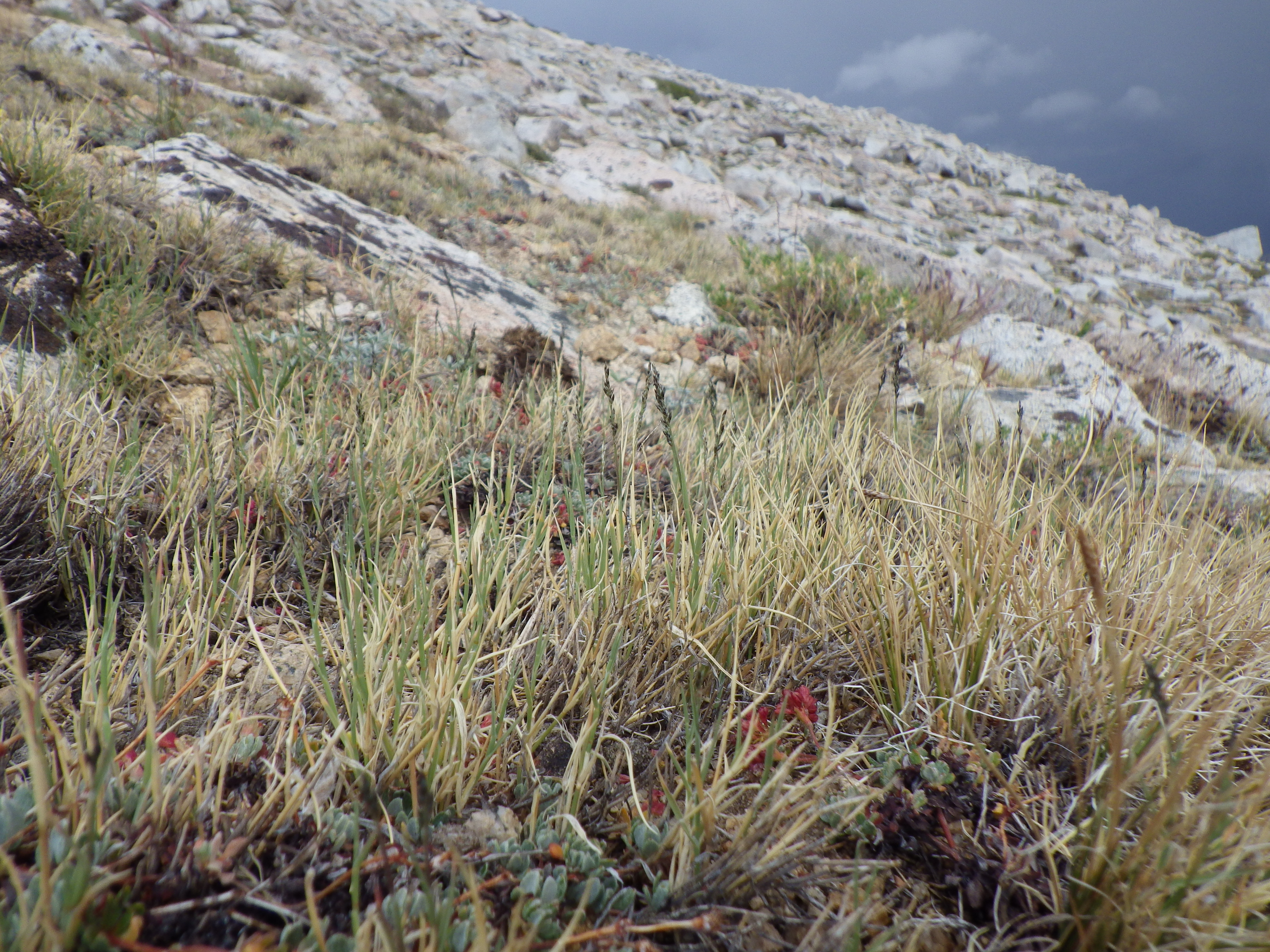

Conservation status
- Secure (NatureServe)

Scientific classification
- Kingdom: Plantae
- Clade: Tracheophytes
- Clade: Angiosperms
- Clade: Monocots
- Clade: Commelinids
- Order: Poales
- Family: Poaceae
- Subfamily: Chloridoideae
- Genus: Muhlenbergia
- Species: M. richardsonis

Binomial name
- Muhlenbergia richardsonis (Trin.) Rydb.

= Muhlenbergia richardsonis =

Species of flowering plant

Muhlenbergia richardsonis, known by the common name mat muhly, is a species of grass. It is native to North America, where it can be found throughout much of Canada, Alaska, the western half of the contiguous United States through California, and in Baja California, Mexico.

== Description ==
Muhlenbergia richardsonis is a rhizomatous perennial grass producing knotted, mat-forming stems up to about 40 centimeters long. The blue-green leaves are up to 5 or 6 centimeters long. The inflorescence is a narrow cylindrical series of tightly appressed branches bearing gray-green, single-flowered spikelets 2 or 3 millimeters long.

== Habitat ==
Muhlenbergia richardsonis grows in a number of habitat types including talus and meadows in alpine mountain environments, wet alkaline and saline soils, desert arroyos, chaparral, forests and woodlands. It is a species of botanical interest for being an alpine plant utilizing C4 carbon fixation, reported at higher altitudes than any other C4 plant in North America. It occurs at 3,670 metres (12,040 ft) of elevation in California, such as in the White Mountains and 3,200 metres (10,500 ft) meters high in Utah.

=== Prairie fens ===
This grass is the only known food plant for the leafhopper Flexamia huroni, which lives only in Michigan. The grass is limited to alkaline prairie fens in the area, an increasingly rare habitat type, making the leafhopper a species of concern itself.
