= Bonaventure, Quebec =

Bonaventure
- City
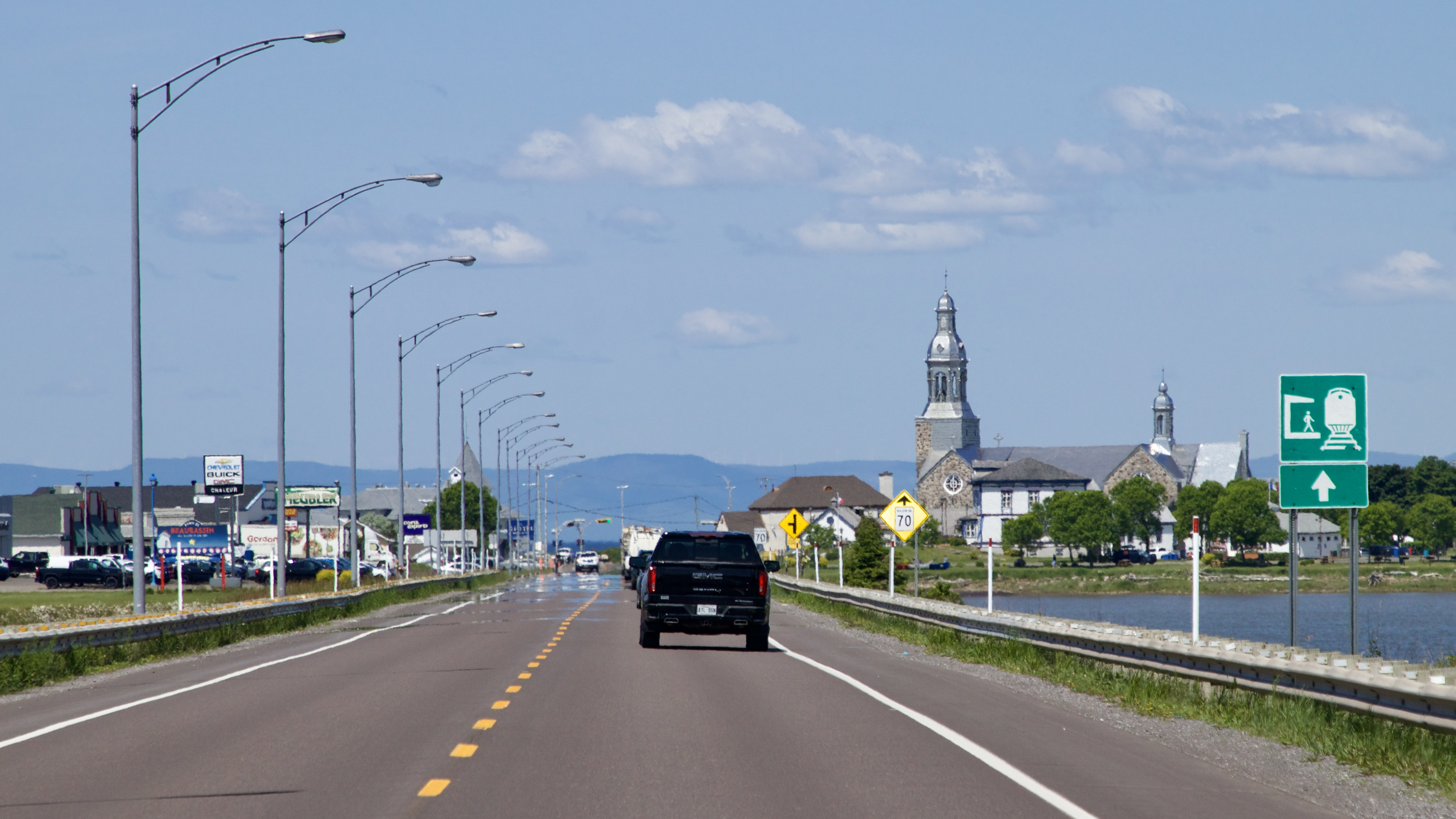

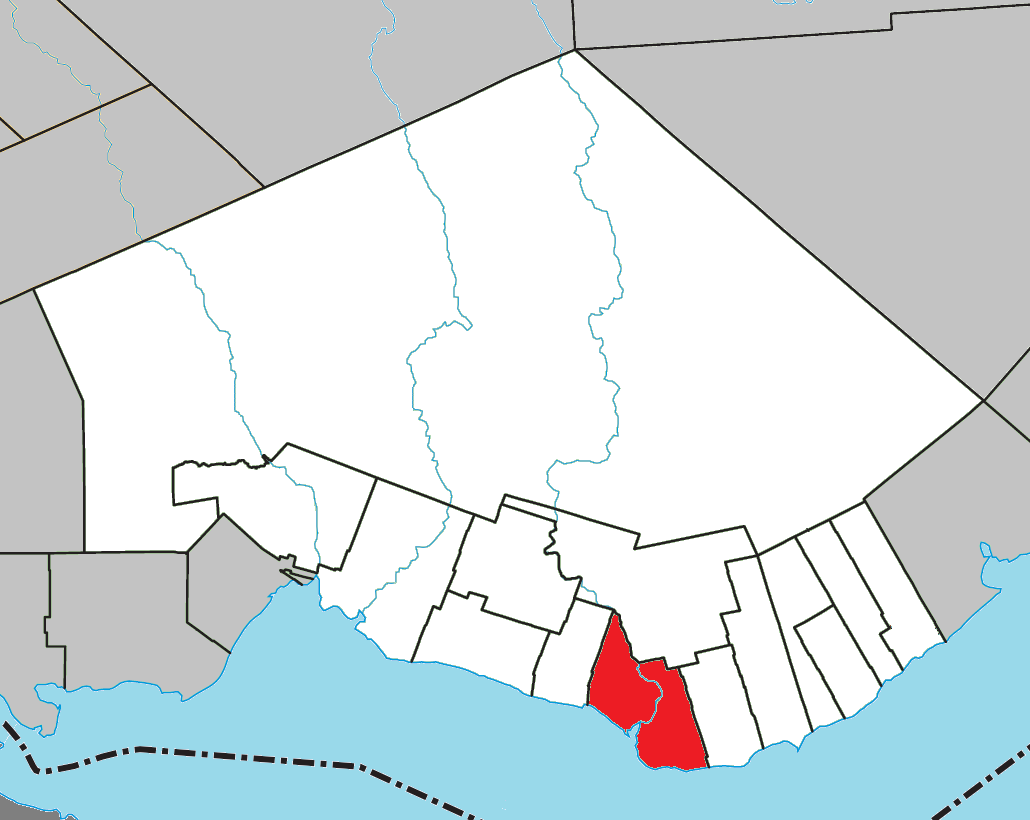
- Location within Bonaventure RCM

- Location in eastern Quebec
- Coordinates: 48°03′N 65°29′W
- Country: Canada
- Province: Quebec
- Region: Gaspésie– Îles-de-la-Madeleine
- RCM: Bonaventure
- Settled: 1760
- Constituted: January 1, 1884

Government
  - Mayor: Pierre Gagnon
  - Federal riding: Gaspésie—Les Îles-de-la-Madeleine—Listuguj
  - Prov. riding: Bonaventure

Area
  - Total: 108.17 km^{2} (41.76 sq mi)
  - Land: 104.50 km^{2} (40.35 sq mi)

Population (2021)
  - Total: 2,733
  - Density: 26.2/km^{2} (68/sq mi)
  - Pop (2016-21): ▲1.0%
  - Dwellings: 1,404
- Time zone: UTC−5 (EST)
  - Summer (DST): UTC−4 (EDT)
- Postal code(s): G0C 1E0
- Area codes: 418 and 581
- Highways: R-132
- GNBC Code: EQKCG
- NTS Map: 022A03
- Website: www.villebonaventure.ca

Bonaventure (French pronunciation: [bɔnavɑ̃tyʁ]; Mi'kmaq: Waqam'tgug) is a town on the Gaspé Peninsula in the Bonaventure Regional County Municipality of Quebec, Canada. It is located on Chaleur Bay near the mouth of the Bonaventure River. The town is situated on Route 132 between Saint-Siméon and New Carlisle.

The majority of the inhabitants are of Acadian descent, who found refuge there after the expulsion of the Acadians in 1755. They arrived there in 1760. The Quebec Acadian Museum (Musée Acadien du Québec) is located in the town. Bonaventure celebrated its 250th anniversary in 2010.

The toponym Bonaventure has been associated with several locations in the Gaspé since the beginnings of New France, such as Bonaventure Island and Bonaventure River. No definite origin of this name has been identified.

== History ==
In 1697, a concession on both sides of the Bonaventure River was granted in 1697 to Charles-Henry de La Croix. Prior to permanent settlement, the Bonaventure harbour was often visited by Europeans and was the location of temporary camps and posts for many years.

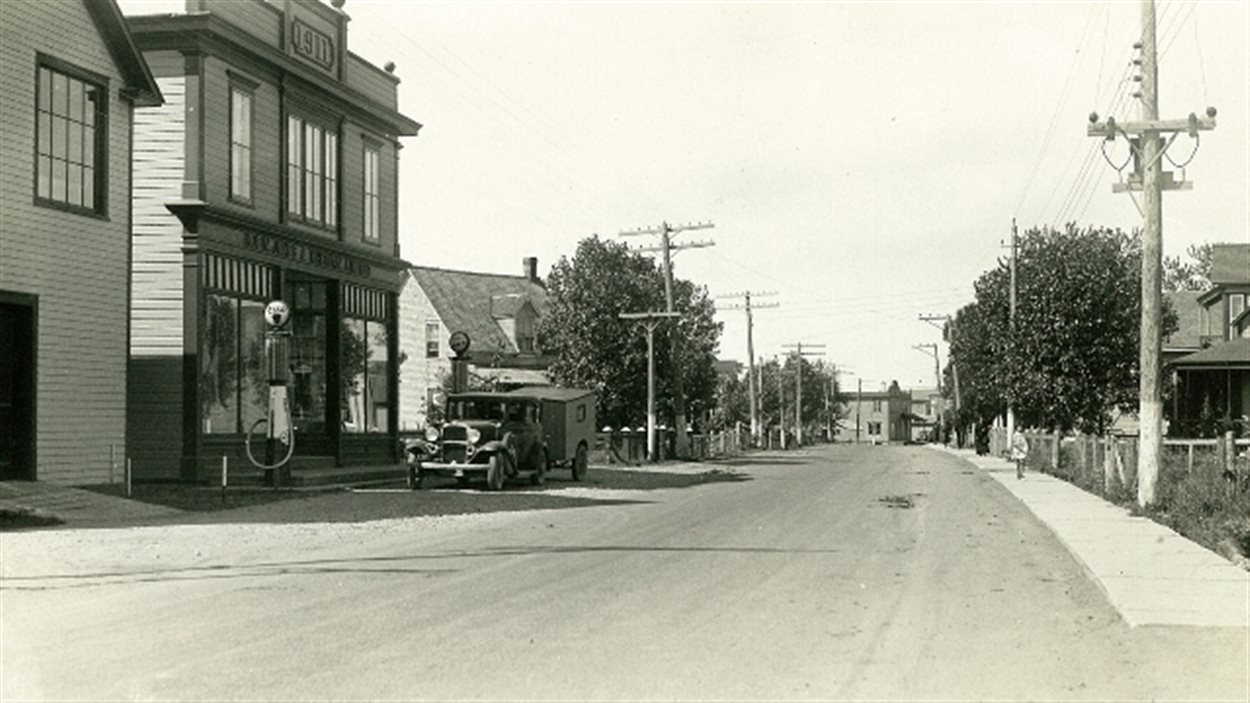
Grand-Pré Avenue in Bonaventure early 20th-century

The first permanent European settlement of Bonaventure was in 1760 by Acadian refugees who had successfully avoided the expulsion of Acadians that had begun in 1755. Some of these early settlers were present at the Battle of Restigouche in July 1760, where a mixed force of French navy aided by Acadians were defeated by the Royal Navy. Many of today's Bonaventure residents are of Acadian descent.

At the time of settlement, Bonaventure was located in lands possessed by France, but in 1763, after the Treaty of Paris, all of New France was ceded to Britain, and Bonaventure became part of British colony of the Province of Quebec. Later, some of the lands already settled by the Acadians were granted to anglophones, although after decades of petitioning the Quebec government, some of the Acadian settlers were able to gain title to the lands they occupied. However, even as late as 1891, more than half of the homesteaders in this region had no legal title to the lands they lived on.

Bonaventure was raided by Americans during the War of Independence.

In 1845, it was first incorporated as the Township Municipality of Hamilton, coinciding with the geographic township that was proclaimed in 1842 and named after Henry Hamilton. In 1847, the township municipality was abolished, but reestablished on July 1, 1855. In 1884, it changed its name and statutes from Township Municipality of Hamilton to Parish Municipality of Saint-Bonaventure de Hamilton.

On December 31, 1955, it changed its name and statutes again to become the Municipality of Bonaventure. On May 3, 1997, its statutes were changed to city (ville).

== Demographics ==
In the 2021 Census of Population conducted by Statistics Canada, Bonaventure had a population of 2,733 living in 1,318 of its 1,404 total private dwellings, a change of 1% from its 2016 population of 2,706. With a land area of 104.5 km^{2} (40.3 sq mi), it had a population density of 26.2/km^{2} (67.7/sq mi) in 2021.

Canada census – Bonaventure community profile

	2021	2016	2011
Population	2,733 (+1.0% from 2016)	2,706 (-2.5% from 2011)	2,775 (+3.8% from 2006)
Land area	104.50 km^{2} (40.35 sq mi)	104.35 km^{2} (40.29 sq mi)	104.15 km^{2} (40.21 sq mi)
Population density	26.2/km^{2} (68/sq mi)	25.9/km^{2} (67/sq mi)	26.6/km^{2} (69/sq mi)
Median age	52.4 (M: 51.6, F: 53.2)	51.1 (M: 51.0, F: 51.2)	48.6 (M: 48.5, F: 48.7)
Private dwellings	1,404 (total) 1,318 (occupied)	1,312 (total)	1,294 (total)
Median household income	$62,800	$57,003	$53,199

References: 2021 2016 2011

Historical Census Data - Bonaventure, Quebec

Year	Pop.	±%
1861	1,309	—
1871	1,484	+13.4%
1881	1,367	−7.9%
1891	2,328	+70.3%
1901	2,862	+22.9%
1911	3,667	+28.1%
1921	2,780	−24.2%
1931	2,804	+0.9%

Year	Pop.	±%
1941	3,015	+7.5%
1951	2,945	−2.3%
1956	3,010	+2.2%
1961	2,929	−2.7%
1966	3,209	+9.6%
1971	2,857	−11.0%
1976	2,895	+1.3%
1981	2,950	+1.9%

Year	Pop.	±%
1986	2,995	+1.5%
1991	2,844	−5.0%
1996	2,884	+1.4%
2001	2,756	−4.4%
2006	2,673	−3.0%
2011	2,775	+3.8%
2016	2,706	−2.5%
2021	2,733	+1.0%

Source: Statistics Canada

Mother tongue language (2021):

Language	Population	Pct (%)
French only	2,525	93%
English only	145	5.3%
Both English and French	25	0.9%
Other languages	20	0.7%

== See also ==
- List of cities in Quebec
