= Bonaventure River =

Bonaventure River Rivière Bonaventure
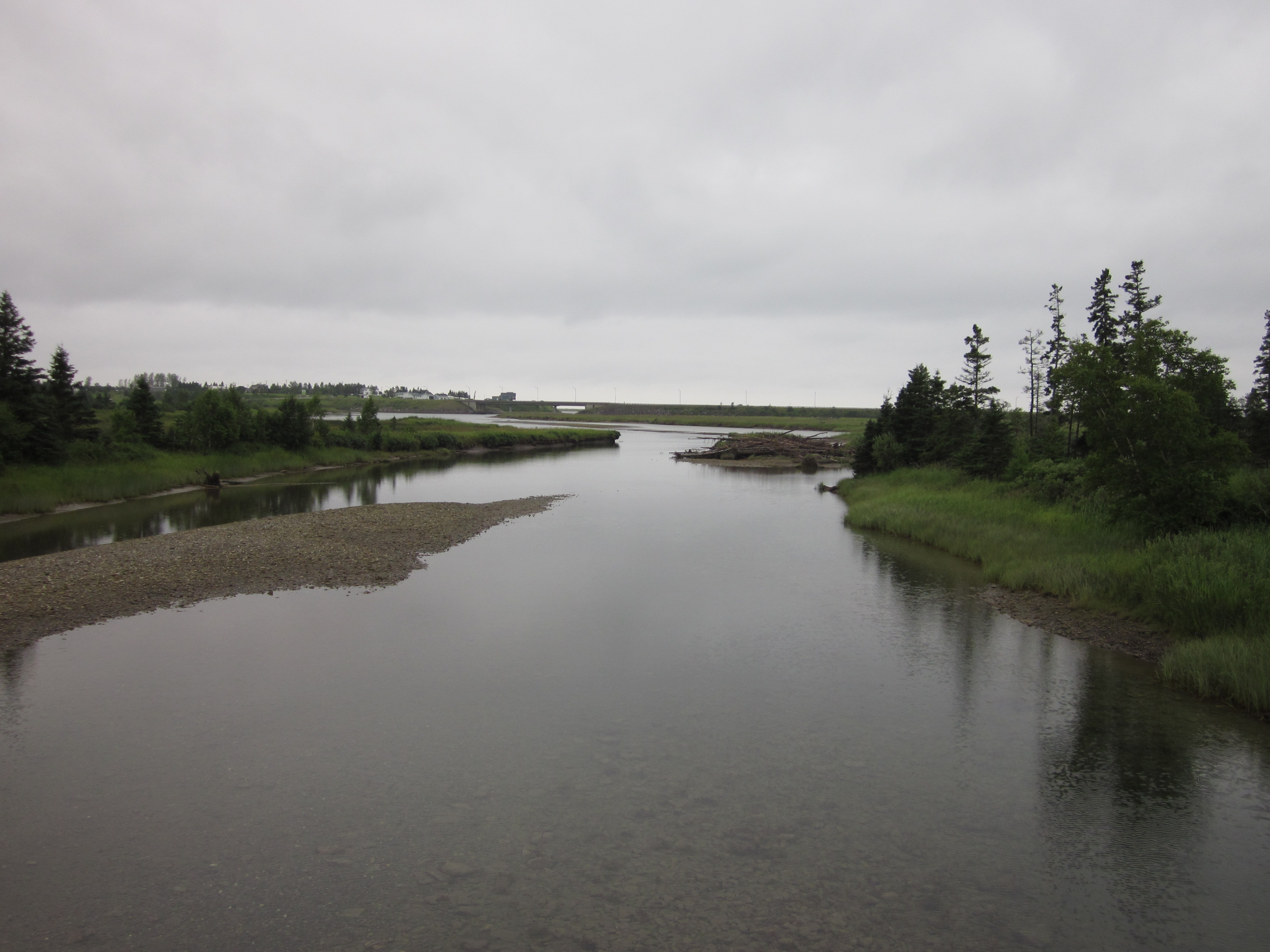
- Mouth of the Bonaventure

Location
- Country: Canada
- Province: Quebec
- Region: Gaspésie–Îles-de-la-Madeleine

Physical characteristics
- Source: Chic-Choc Mountains
  - location: Mont-Albert, Quebec
  - coordinates: 48°53′00″N 65°32′30″W
  - elevation: 600 m (2,000 ft)
- Mouth: Chaleur Bay
  - location: Bonaventure, Quebec
  - coordinates: 48°02′00″N 65°29′00″W
  - elevation: 0 m (0 ft)
- Length: 115 km (71 mi)

Basin features
- Tributaries
  - left: Hall River
  - right: West Bonaventure River

The Bonaventure River (French: rivière Bonaventure, pronounced [ʁivjɛʁ bɔnavɑ̃tyʁ]) is a river in the Gaspé Peninsula of Quebec, Canada. It rises in the Chic-Choc Mountains and flows south to empty into Baie des Chaleurs near the town of Bonaventure, Quebec. The river is about 115 km (71 mi) long.

The indigenous Mi'kmaq called the river Wagamet, meaning "clear water". The river is still noted for its clear, cold water, making it well known as a great place for Atlantic Salmon fishing and recreational canoeing.

The origin of the river's name is uncertain. It may come from the French bonne aventure (meaning "good fortune"); or named in honour of Simon-Pierre Denys de Bonaventure; or named after the ship Bonaventure of Lord La Court de Pré-Ravillon et de Granpré who entered the Gulf of Saint Lawrence in 1591. In any case, this name was already in use in 1697 when Governor Louis de Buade de Frontenac and Superintendent Jean Bochart de Champigny granted both sides of the river as the Seignory of the Bonavanture [sic] River to Charles-Henry de La Croix.

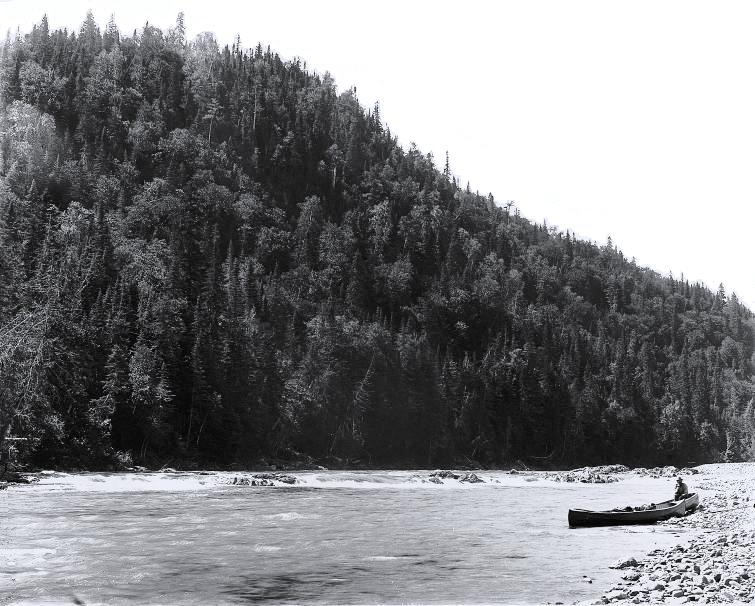
Bonaventure River circa 1898

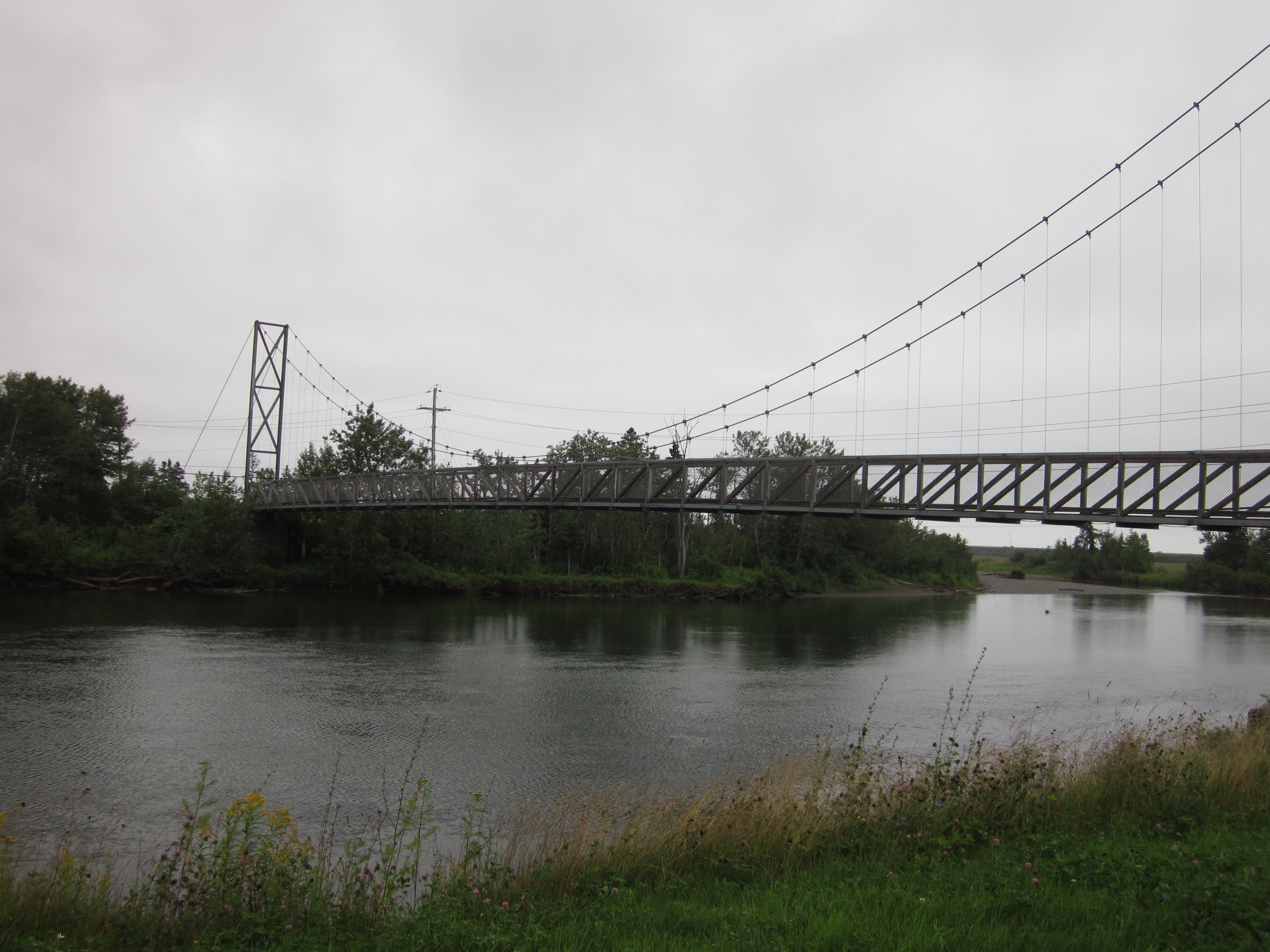
Footbridge over the Bonaventure

== See also ==
- List of rivers of Quebec
