= Streator, Illinois =

Streator
- City
- Streator, Illinois
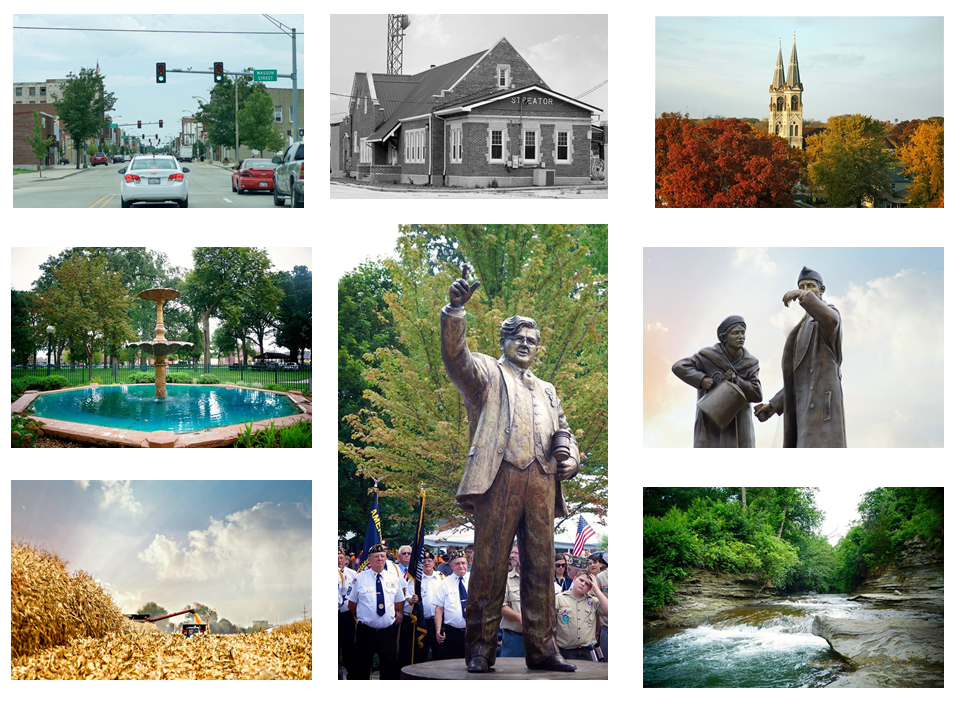
- Images representing the city of Streator, Illinois

- Seal
- Etymology: Named for Worthy S. Streator
- Motto: Quiet Surprise on the Prairie
- Location of Streator in LaSalle County, Illinois.
- Coordinates: 41°7′15″N 88°50′8″W
- Country: United States
- State: Illinois
- Counties: LaSalle, Livingston
- Townships: Bruce, Eagle, Otter Creek, Reading
- Settlement: 1861
- Incorporated (city): 1868

Government
  - Type: Council-manager government
  - Mayor: Tara Bedei

Area
  - Total: 7.37 sq mi (19.10 km^{2})
  - Land: 7.31 sq mi (18.93 km^{2})
  - Water: 0.069 sq mi (0.18 km^{2})
- Elevation: 623 ft (190 m)

Population (2020)
  - Total: 12,500
  - Estimate (2024): 12,295
  - Density: 1,671.7/sq mi (645.45/km^{2})
- Time zone: UTC−6 (CST)
  - Summer (DST): UTC−5 (CDT)
- ZIP code: 61364
- Area codes: 815, 779
- FIPS code: 17-73170
- Website: www.ci.streator.il.us

Streator /ˈstriːtər/ is a city in LaSalle and Livingston counties in the U.S. state of Illinois. The city is situated on the Vermilion River approximately 81 miles (130 km) southwest of Chicago in the prairie and farm land of north-central Illinois. As of the 2020 census, the population of Streator was 12,500.

== History ==
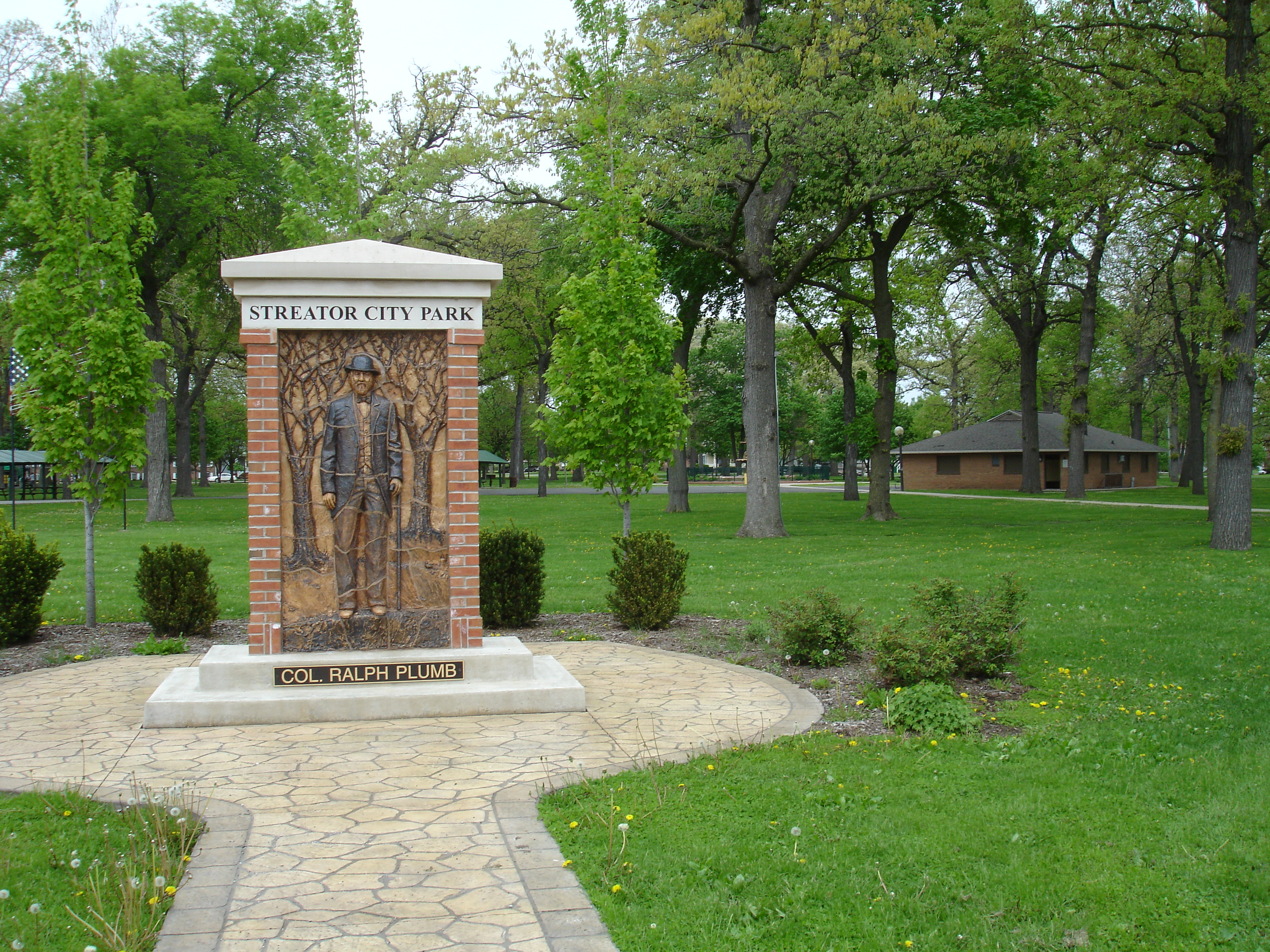
A relief of Ralph Plumb in Streator City Park

Although settlements had occasionally existed in the area, they were not permanent. In 1824, surveyors for the Illinois and Michigan Canal which would extend from Chicago's Bridgeport neighborhood to the Illinois River, a tributary of the Mississippi River, arrived in this area of the Vermilion River, followed by homesteaders by the 1830s. In 1861, miner John O'Neill established a trading post called "Hardscrabble" (ironically an early name for the Bridgeport neighborhood), supposedly because he watched loaded animals struggle up the river's banks. Another name for the new settlement was "Unionville".

Streator received its current name to honor Worthy S. Streator, an Ohio industrialist who financed the region's first coal mining operation. Streator received a town charter in 1868 and incorporated as a city in 1882. In 1882 Col. Ralph Plumb was elected as its first mayor. Streator's early growth was due to the coal mine, as well as a major glass manufacturer and its status as a Midwestern railroad hub. Today Streator's economy is led by heavy-equipment manufacturer Vactor and food distributor U.S. Foodservice.

The city is the hometown of Clyde Tombaugh, who in 1930 discovered the dwarf planet Pluto, the first object to be discovered in what would later be identified as the Kuiper belt; and George "Honey Boy" Evans, who wrote "In the Good Old Summer Time."

=== Pre-settlement ===
The city of Chicago served as the main impetus of growth in the area throughout the early 19th century alongside—of more importance to the region around Streator—the development of the Illinois and Michigan Canal in 1821. This canal connected Lake Michigan to the Mississippi River and greatly increasing shipping traffic in the region. Land speculation in areas lining the canal and rivers ensued and towns sprouted quickly. Individual settlements in the Bruce Township region started as early as 1821. In 1861, John O'Neil established the first settlement in what was to become the city of Streator when he opened a small grocery and trading business.

=== Coal and cityhood ===
Streator began with coal. Vast beds of coal lie just beneath the surface throughout much of Illinois. The demand for coal was increasing in the mid-19th century, and East Coast capitalists were willing to invest in this region. The area was originally known as Hardscrabble, "because it was a hard scrabble to cross the Vermilion River and get up the hill to where the town was first located". The town was renamed Unionville in honor of the local men who fought for the Union during the Civil War.

In 1866 Worthy S. Streator, a prominent railroad promoter from Cleveland, Ohio, financed the region's first mining operation. Streator approached his nephew Col. Ralph Plumb at a railway station in December 1865 about overseeing a mining operation in central Illinois for him and several investors. Colonel Plumb agreed and arrived in the town then called Hardscrabble in February 1866. Success of the project required a rail line near the mines. Plumb and Streator "invited" Streator's friend, then-Ohio Congressman James A. Garfield, to sign on as an investor. In return, Garfield was expected to work with Robert C. Schenck, then the president of the American Central railroad, in getting the railroad to "bend their lines" to Streator, though this did not pan out. The Vermilion Company then made arrangements with the Fox River line for their much-needed rail service.

Included in Col. Plumb's duties were overseeing the platting and incorporation of the quickly growing area. Plumb served as Streator's first mayor, serving two terms. Plumb's mark on the early development of Streator was notable. The main hotel and the local opera house bore his name. He financed the construction of the city's first high school. Earlier in his life he served as an Ohio state representative and as an officer in the Union Army. Later in life he served Illinois as a representative in Congress.

Streator grew rapidly due to a number of factors: the need for coal in Chicago, the desire of European immigrants to come to America, and the investments made by East Coast capitalists willing to invest in coal operations. Plumb needed laborers for his mines, but the Vermilion Coal Company was unable to afford European employment agents. Instead, it alerted steamship offices of the new job opportunities and convinced local railroads to carry notices of Streator's promise. Land was sold to incoming miners at discounted prices as another enticement, but the company retained mineral rights to the land. In 1870, Streator's population was 1,486, but by 1880 its population tripled. Scottish, English, Welsh, German and Irish immigrants came to the area first, followed later by scores of mostly Slovaks; Czechs, Austrians and Hungarians came in lesser numbers. Today many of the residents are direct descendants of these original miners.

The success of the local mining operations and the introduction of the new glass making industry allowed for improvements in the living conditions and personal wealth of its miners and laborers. An 1884 survey by the Illinois Bureau of Labor Statistics showed that 20 percent of Streator's miners owned their houses. Labor movements like the Miners National Association and the United Mine Workers of America began to flourish, as did ethnic churches and social institutions such as the Masons and Knights of Pythias. In his 1877 History of LaSalle County, author H.F. Kett states:

Perhaps no city...in Illinois, outside of the great city of Chicago, presents an instance of such rapid and substantial growth as the city of Streator. From a single small grocery house... the locality has grown to be a city of 6,000 prosperous and intelligent people. Churches, school-houses, large, substantial business houses and handsome residences, with elegant grounds and surroundings, now beautify the waste of ten years ago, while the hum of machinery and thronged streets are unmistakable evidences of business importance and prosperity.

In addition to coal, the area around Streator contained rich clay and shale, which gave rise to Streator's brick, tile and pipe industries. In time, these supplanted coal as Streator's leading exports, but Streator was best known for its glass bottle industry. In the early 20th century, Streator held the title of "Glass Manufacturing Capital of the World." Streator continued to flourish for much of the early 20th century. Ultimately the demand for coal was replaced with the growing needs for gas and oil. Many of the underground mines in Streator closed during the 1920s. The last of the mines shut down in 1958. While other areas of LaSalle County continued to grow, Streator's population peaked at about 17,000 residents in 1960 and has since declined. Many of the original downtown buildings have been demolished, but few have been replaced. Another reason for static growth in Streator is its distance from any major Interstate Highway. When the federal highway system started in the 1950s and 1960s no interstate was built near the city. Streator is 23 miles (37 km) from Interstate 55, 16 miles (26 km) from Interstate 80 and Interstate 39.

=== 2007 Comprehensive plan ===
Streator and the North Central Illinois Council of Governments finalized the Streator Comprehensive Plan in February 2007. The plan, if approved, is a roadmap for civic, transportation, housing, commercial and recreational improvements in the city through 2027.

== Geography ==
As of 2021, Streator has a total area of 7.376 square miles (19.10 km^{2}), of which 7.308 square miles (18.93 km^{2}) (or 99.1%) is land and 0.068 square miles (0.18 km^{2}) (or 0.9%) is water.

Streator lies within the Vermilion River/Illinois River Basin Assessment Area defined by the watershed of the Vermilion River, a major tributary to the Illinois River in Central Illinois, an area of mostly flat prairie.

Streator's coal mining history closely parallels Illinois', with a great push in coal production from 1866 until the 1920s, when many of the mines closed. The low-sulfur coal of the Powder River Basin of Wyoming and the growing demands for oil caused a decline in demand for Streator's high-sulfur coal.

=== Climate ===
Streator

Climate chart (precipitation, max. and min. temperature)
J	F	M	A	M	J	J	A	S	O	N	D
1.6 33 16	1.5 37 19	2.6 49 29	3.3 63 40	3.8 74 50	3.8 83 60	3.5 87 64	3.7 85 62	3.6 78 54	2.5 66 43	2.3 50 32	1.9 36 20
- █ Average max. and min. temperatures in °F
- █ Precipitation totals in inches
- Source: Illinois State Climatologist Data (Streator)
Metric conversion
J	F	M	A	M	J	J	A	S	O	N	D
41 1 −9	37 3 −7	66 9 −2	85 17 4	97 23 10	97 28 16	88 31 18	93 29 17	90 26 12	62 19 6	59 10 0	49 2 −7
- █ Average max. and min. temperatures in °C
- █ Precipitation totals in mm

Streator has a continental climate, influenced by the Great Lakes. Its average winter temperature is 25.0 °F (−3.9 °C) and its average summer temperature is 75.0 °F (23.9 °C). Streator has an average annual rainfall of 34.68 inches (88.09 cm), with an annual snowfall of 22.0 in (55.88 cm). The highest temperature recorded in Streator was 112 °F (44 °C) in July 1936. The lowest temperature recorded was −25 °F (−32 °C) in January 1985.

Climate data for Streator, Illinois (1991–2020 normals, extremes 1893–present)
Month	Jan	Feb	Mar	Apr	May	Jun	Jul	Aug	Sep	Oct	Nov	Dec	Year
Record high °F (°C)	69 (21)	69 (21)	87 (31)	92 (33)	99 (37)	102 (39)	108 (42)	103 (39)	103 (39)	95 (35)	81 (27)	70 (21)	108 (42)
Mean daily maximum °F (°C)	31.9 (−0.1)	36.7 (2.6)	48.9 (9.4)	62.2 (16.8)	73.7 (23.2)	84.1 (28.9)	87.5 (30.8)	84.2 (29.0)	77.6 (25.3)	64.7 (18.2)	49.3 (9.6)	37.2 (2.9)	61.5 (16.4)
Daily mean °F (°C)	23.9 (−4.5)	28.0 (−2.2)	39.1 (3.9)	51.3 (10.7)	62.7 (17.1)	73.2 (22.9)	76.5 (24.7)	73.9 (23.3)	66.4 (19.1)	54.3 (12.4)	40.8 (4.9)	29.7 (−1.3)	51.6 (10.9)
Mean daily minimum °F (°C)	15.9 (−8.9)	19.3 (−7.1)	29.3 (−1.5)	40.3 (4.6)	51.6 (10.9)	62.2 (16.8)	65.5 (18.6)	63.5 (17.5)	55.2 (12.9)	43.8 (6.6)	32.2 (0.1)	22.2 (−5.4)	41.8 (5.4)
Record low °F (°C)	−20 (−29)	−26 (−32)	−10 (−23)	8 (−13)	23 (−5)	37 (3)	41 (5)	39 (4)	20 (−7)	15 (−9)	−9 (−23)	−17 (−27)	−26 (−32)
Average precipitation inches (mm)	2.56 (65)	1.92 (49)	2.78 (71)	3.73 (95)	4.69 (119)	4.67 (119)	4.10 (104)	3.70 (94)	3.56 (90)	2.98 (76)	2.57 (65)	2.17 (55)	39.43 (1,002)
Average snowfall inches (cm)	9.6 (24)	4.8 (12)	3.7 (9.4)	0.7 (1.8)	0.0 (0.0)	0.0 (0.0)	0.0 (0.0)	0.0 (0.0)	0.0 (0.0)	0.0 (0.0)	0.8 (2.0)	6.8 (17)	26.4 (67)
Average precipitation days (≥ 0.01 in)	8.9	7.6	9.6	11.6	12.3	10.7	8.7	9.3	7.4	9.2	9.0	8.8	113.1
Average snowy days (≥ 0.1 in)	4.8	3.9	1.5	0.4	0.0	0.0	0.0	0.0	0.0	0.0	0.9	3.6	15.1
Source: NOAA

==== 1903 tornado ====
An F3 tornado hit the west side of Streator on July 17, 1903, killing six people and injuring 30. Five people died when the grandstand of a racetrack, where they had taken shelter, collapsed.

==== 1951 flood ====
The worst flood in Streator's history occurred in 1951. The Vermilion River reached a flood level of 18 feet (549 cm).

==== 2010 tornado ====
At approximately 8:50 pm (CDT) on June 5, 2010, an EF2 tornado swept through southern Streator. The tornado initially touched down east of Magnolia, causing EF0 and EF1 damage as it traveled east. EF2 damage began as the tornado passed East 15th Road. No fatalities were reported, but there were reports of leveled houses and extensive damage throughout the area. The National Weather Service reported that there were two tornadoes. The second was reported to have touched down one mile west of Streator, with a base of 50 feet.

==== 2026 tornado ====
On June 11, 2026, an EF3 tornado struck the city. This tornado was warned with the somewhat rare particularly dangerous situation (PDS) tag from the NWS office in Chicago.

== Demographics ==
Historical population
Census	Pop.	Note	%±
1870	1,486		—
1880	5,157		247.0%
1890	11,414		121.3%
1900	14,079		23.3%
1910	14,253		1.2%
1920	14,779		3.7%
1930	14,728		−0.3%
1940	14,930		1.4%
1950	16,469		10.3%
1960	16,868		2.4%
1970	15,600		−7.5%
1980	14,795		−5.2%
1990	14,121		−4.6%
2000	14,190		0.5%
2010	13,710		−3.4%
2020	12,500		−8.8%
U.S. Decennial Census

=== 2020 census ===
As of the 2020 census, Streator had a population of 12,500.

The median age was 41.0 years. 22.7% of residents were under the age of 18 and 19.9% of residents were 65 years of age or older. For every 100 females there were 95.6 males, and for every 100 females age 18 and over there were 94.7 males age 18 and over.

There were 5,286 households in Streator, of which 26.9% had children under the age of 18 living in them. Of all households, 36.9% were married-couple households, 22.6% were households with a male householder and no spouse or partner present, and 31.2% were households with a female householder and no spouse or partner present. About 35.0% of all households were made up of individuals and 16.9% had someone living alone who was 65 years of age or older.

There were 2,949 families residing in the city. The population density was 1,694.69 inhabitants per square mile (654.32/km^{2}). There were 6,009 housing units at an average density of 814.67 per square mile (314.55/km^{2}), of which 12.0% were vacant. The homeowner vacancy rate was 2.9% and the rental vacancy rate was 12.8%.

99.1% of residents lived in urban areas, while 0.9% lived in rural areas.

Racial composition as of the 2020 census
Race	Number	Percent
White	10,117	80.9%
Black or African American	438	3.5%
American Indian and Alaska Native	66	0.5%
Asian	78	0.6%
Native Hawaiian and Other Pacific Islander	0	0.0%
Some other race	726	5.8%
Two or more races	1,075	8.6%
Hispanic or Latino (of any race)	1,697	13.6%

=== 2000 census ===
There were 5,762 households, out of which 24.4% had children under the age of 18 living with them, 33.74% were married couples living together, 12.55% had a female householder with no husband present, and 48.82% were non-families. 43.21% of all households were made up of individuals, and 17.09% had someone living alone who was 65 years of age or older. The average household size was 2.89 and the average family size was 2.10.

The city's age distribution consisted of 20.0% under the age of 18, 10.7% from 18 to 24, 25.9% from 25 to 44, 24.4% from 45 to 64, and 19.0% who were 65 years of age or older. The median age was 40.4 years. For every 100 females, there were 93.8 males. For every 100 females age 18 and over, there were 93.9 males.

The median income for a household in the city was $40,778, and the median income for a family was $59,266. Males had a median income of $44,976 versus $21,567 for females. The per capita income for the city was $25,818. About 17.9% of families and 21.5% of the population were below the poverty line, including 40.0% of those under age 18 and 4.6% of those age 65 or over.

=== Regional context ===
Streator is a principal city of the Ottawa Micropolitan Statistical Area, which was the tenth-most populous Micropolitan Statistical Area in the United States as of 2009. The small Livingston County portion of Streator is part of the Pontiac Micropolitan Statistical Area.

Historically, the population of LaSalle County has increased 75% between 1870 and 1990, while the statewide population has grown 350%.

== Economy ==
Streator's economic history has been tied with its natural resources. Coal was the initial catalyst of the city's economy from 1866 until the late 1920s. As the community matured, silica deposits provided the resource for Streator's next industry leader: glass-container manufacturing. While the coal industry eventually died, glass manufacturing remains a presence in Streator. Agriculture and related agri-business in the farmlands of LaSalle County and nearby Livingston County are also a strong influence in Streator's economic engine. Though manufacturing provides the greatest share of earnings, the service industry now accounts for the largest share of jobs.

=== Coal ===
Coal production in LaSalle County and Illinois peaked in the 1910s. Wyoming's Powder River Basin coal reserves, which contain a much lower sulfur content, were discovered in 1889, with full scale mining beginning in the 1920s.

=== Glass manufacturing ===
Glassmaking and, more specifically, glass blowing, is a highly-skilled craft. Most of America's glassblowers came from Europe, or were trained there. Many of Streator's immigrant coal miners were trained in glassblowing. High-grade silica, the main ingredient in glass, was in abundance in the Streator region and nearby Ottawa. The combination of silica, coal to fire the furnaces and skilled craftsmen were a perfect match for Streator's second major industry which began in 1887 with the Streator Bottle and Glass Company. Other companies like Thatcher Glass Manufacturing Corp (later Anchor Glass Containers), which began manufacturing milk bottles in 1909, the American Bottle Company in 1905, the Streator Cathedral Glass Company in 1890, Owens-Illinois and others soon followed. Through the 20th century Streator was known as the "Glass Container Capital of the World."

=== Major employers ===
Three of Streator's largest companies are some of its longest-lasting companies. Vactor Manufacturing began in 1911 as the Myers-Sherman Company, manufacturing milking machines and conveyors for the agricultural industry. In the 1960s Myers-Sherman patented a sewer cleaning vehicle for the municipal public works market. The company was renamed Vactor when it became a subsidiary of the Federal Signal Corporation They are the world's leading producer of heavy-duty sewer cleaning equipment. They are the second-largest employer in Streator with 530 employees.

Owens-Illinois' Streator plant produces Duraglas XL bottles; a lightweight, stronger beer bottle for the Miller Brewing Company. Owens Bottle Company opened in Streator in 1916. Production peaked in the 1960s with 3,500 employees working in its 68-acre (28 ha) facility. Today it is Streator's fifth-largest employer, with 210 employees. In 2006, the plant was honored by the Miller Brewing Company for producing 650 million bottles for the brewer.

St. Mary's Hospital is the city's largest employer with 550 employees. In late 2015, OSF Healthcare system purchased the hospital from HSHS Medical Group. It is undetermined what OSF Healthcare will do with the hospital. Founded in 1886 by the Hospital Sisters of the Third Order of St. Francis, this 251-bed hospital serves Streator and its outlying areas.

Streator was briefly home to the Erie Motor Carriage Company (which became Barley Motor Car Co.). Current products of Streator include building and paving brick, milk, soda bottles, auto parts, sewer pipe, clothing, drain tile, auto truck dump bodies, and hydraulic hoists. Its major agricultural crops include corn and soybeans.

== Arts, culture and media ==
Streator's parks and events reflect its heritage and prairie locale. A number of its residents have distinguished themselves in the art world.

=== Arts ===
The Community Players of Streator offer summer stock theatre performances each year at the William C. Schiffbauer Center for the Performing Arts at Engle Lane Theatre.

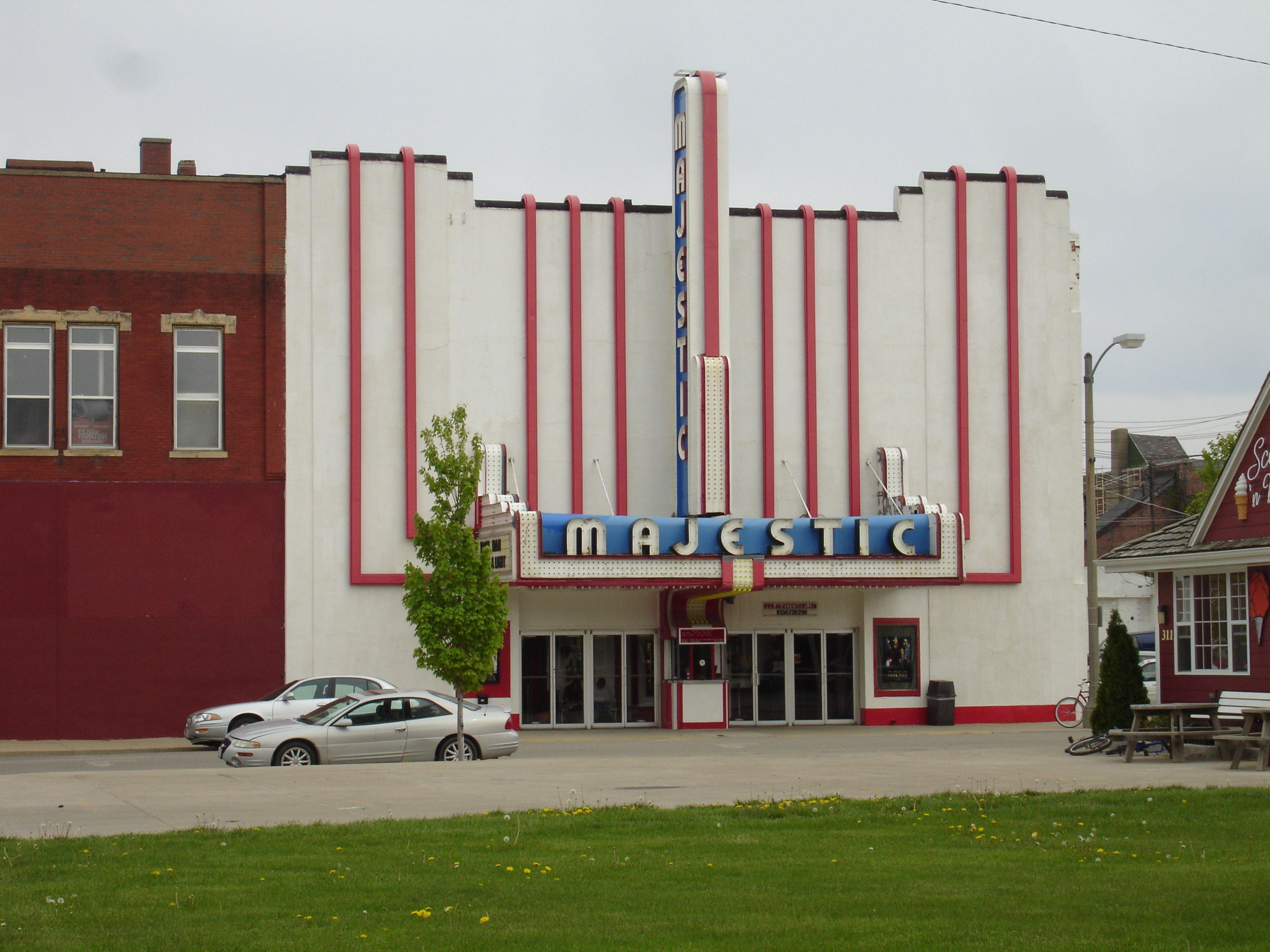
Majestic Theatre in Streator, Illinois

The Majestic Theatre, an art deco style movie house, originally opened in 1907 as a vaudeville house. It has gone through many changes, openings, and closings throughout its history, having most recently reopened in 2002. The Majestic shows recently released movies as well as hosting live musical acts. It has since closed due to deterioration.

The Walldogs painted 17 murals in the summer of 2018. The downtown now is home to more than 20 murals.

=== Museums and historical buildings ===
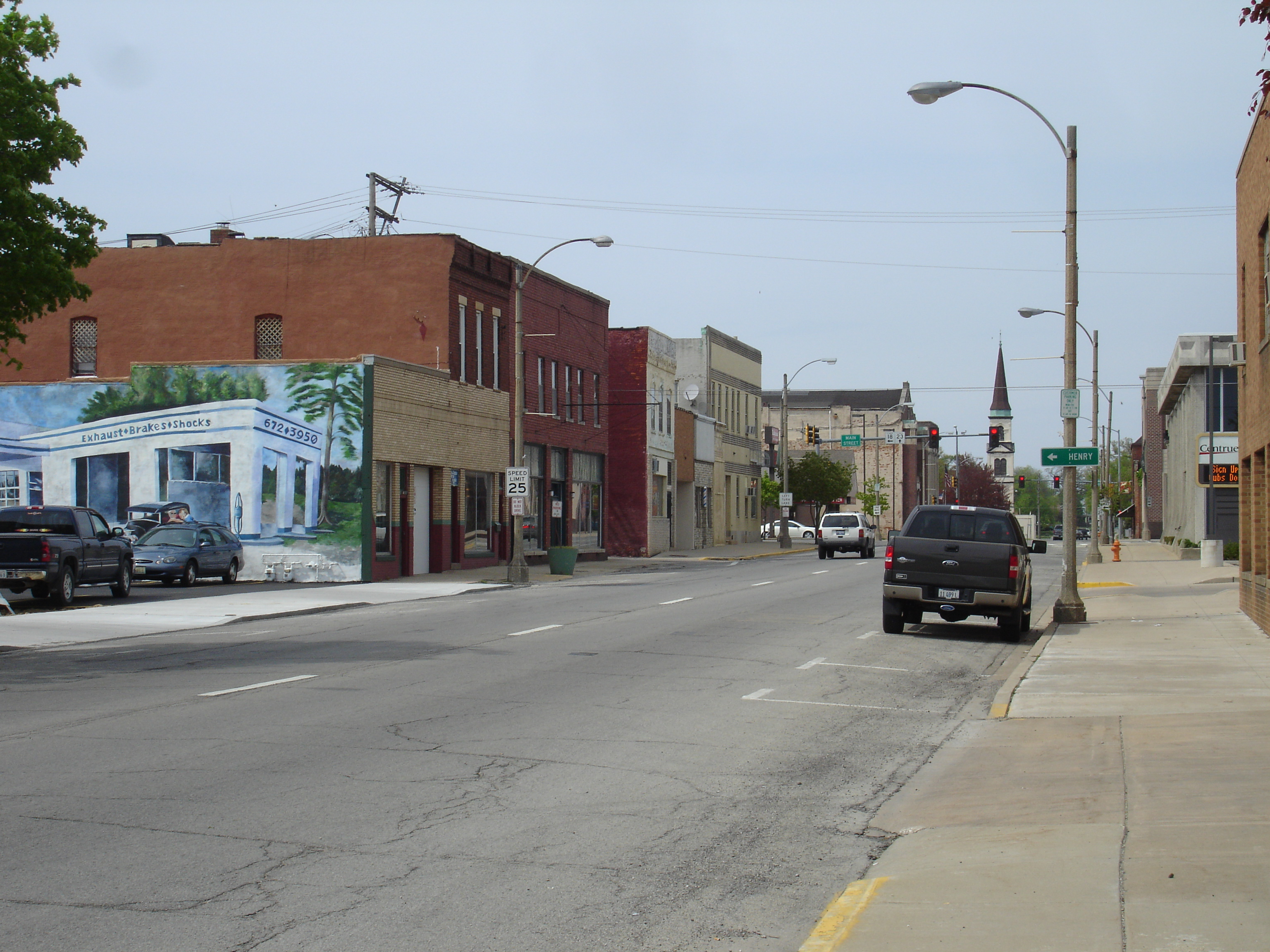
Buildings in downtown Streator

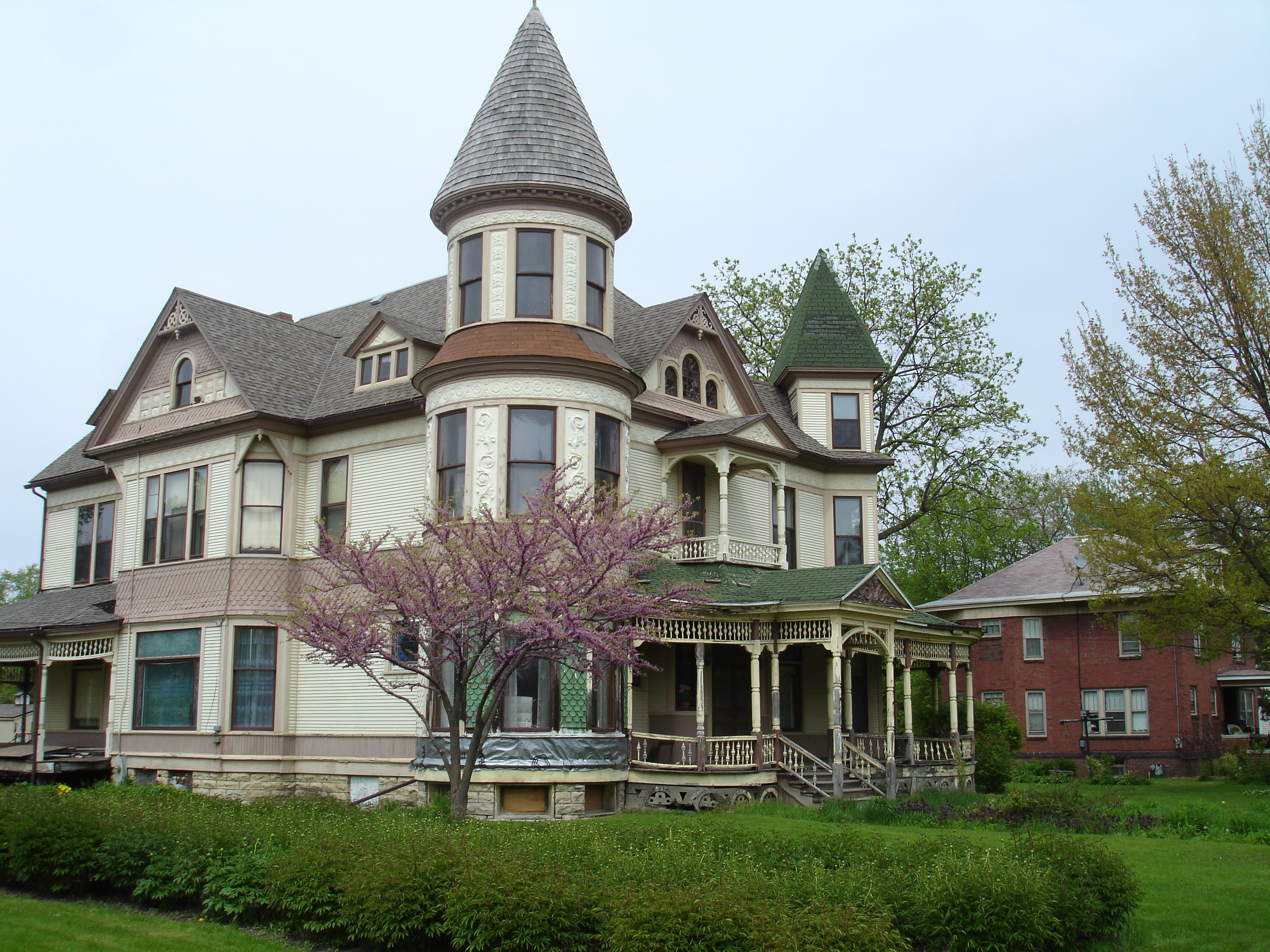
The Silas Williams House is listed on the National Register of Historic Places.

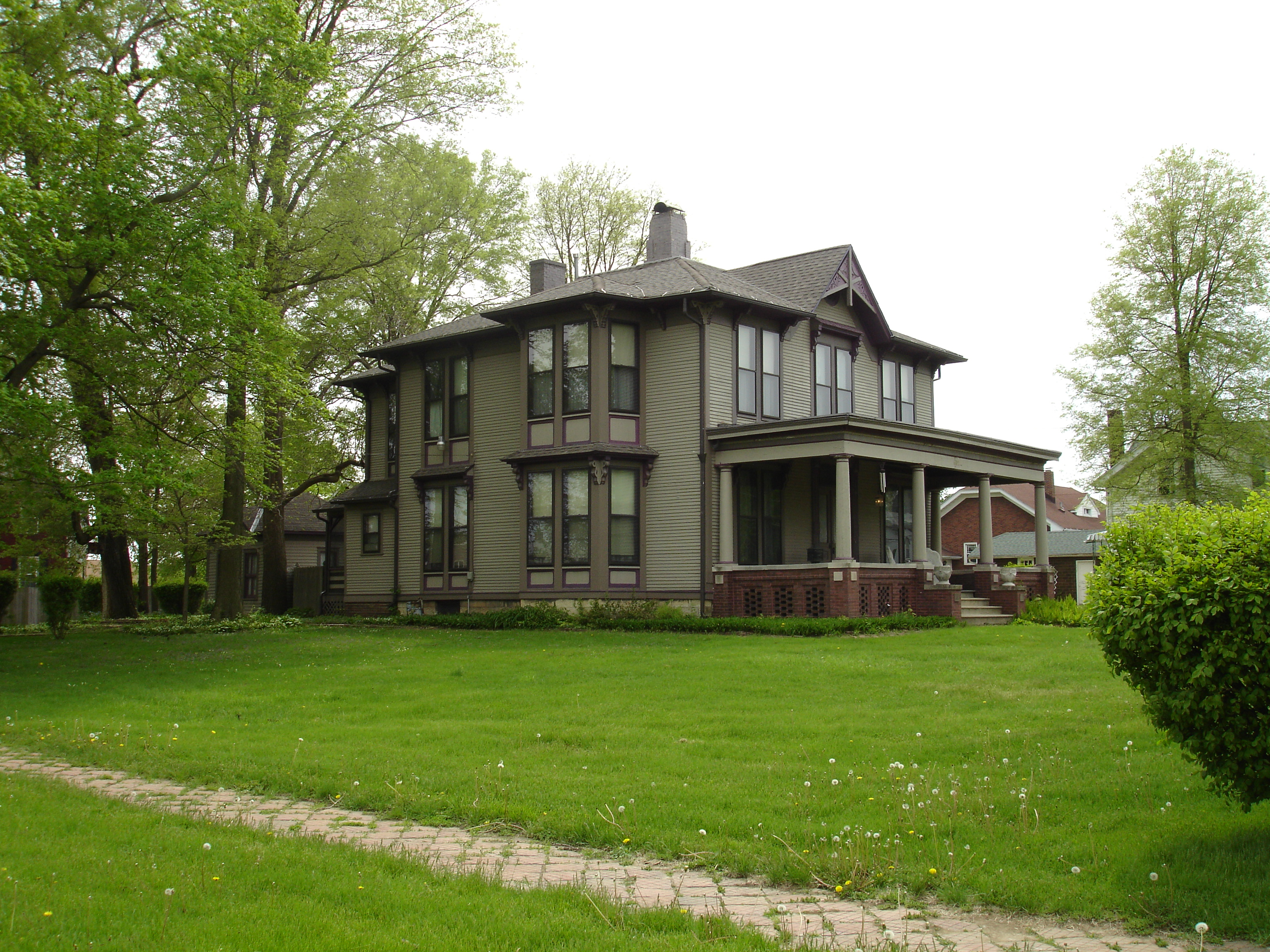
The Ruffin Drew Fletcher House is listed on the National Register of Historic Places.

The Streatorland Historical Society Museum houses displays of Streator history and memorabilia of some of its famous citizens. One of the displays is a tribute to the Free Canteen. The Canteen was a group of local volunteers who served over 1.5 million soldiers during World War II who briefly stopped at the city's old Santa Fe Train Depot while traveling by troop trains. Other features include a homemade telescope used by astronomer Clyde Tombaugh and a Burlington Northern caboose rail car.

During World War II, the Streator Santa Fe Train Depot was a busy way-station for millions of soldiers and sailors who passed through the town on the way to or from training for the war. Beginning in 1943, the Streator Parents Service Club, a group of parents of veterans of the war, created the Streator Free Canteen. The volunteers handed out sandwiches and coffee and presented a friendly face to the servicemen during their stopover in Streator. During the 2½ years that the canteen operated, volunteers hosted over 1.5 million servicemen and women. Thirty other service groups from Streator joined to assist the Parents Service Club as well as 43 other organizations throughout the central-Illinois region. On Veterans Day, November 10, 2006, a bronze statue commemorating the "Coffee Pot Ladies" of Streator was dedicated at the Santa Fe Railroad Station.

The Streator Public Library was made possible with a $35,000 grant from Andrew Carnegie. With its two-story high domed ceiling, Ionic columns and oak staircases, it was considered too extravagant by critics when it opened in 1903. The Library was added to the National Register of Historic Places in 1996. The Ruffin Drew Fletcher House located on East Broadway Street is an example of Stick style architecture. It was placed on the National Register of Historic Places in August 1991. The Silas Williams House is a Queen Anne style home built-in 1893. It was placed on the National Register of Historic Places in June 1976. Founded in 1883, St. Stephens Catholic Church was the first Slovak Catholic church in the United States. In September 2010, the four Roman Catholic churches in Streator were consolidated into one new parish named St. Michael the Archangel. Currently, all masses are conducted at St. Stephen's Church and discussions are continuing to decide if a new church will be built or if one of the existing churches will be rebuilt.

Among Streator's other notable buildings is the ornate Bauhaus-inspired National Guard Armory near the Vermilion River and the town's turn-of-the-20th-century City Hall on Park Street (now a business). These facilities are accessible to the public, with some limitations. Streator is also home to many private residences of significant historical interest and value, including the Kennedy Home on Pleasant Avenue.

=== Events ===
The Streator Food Truck Festival is held annually in May.

Park Fest is held during the Memorial Day weekend through Sunday. Park Fest activities are held in City Park (the main public park in the downtown Streator area).

A Memorial Day observance is held on the morning of Memorial Day at the Veterans Plaza at the southeast part of City Park.

Streator is a designated stop each year in the annual "Heritage Tractor Adventure" along the Illinois and Michigan Canal. This three-day tractor ride/rally attracts hundreds of antique tractor owners.

The annual Fourth of July celebration runs for over four days with events throughout the city, with most of the events held in City Park; the park-based events include a carnival, 5K run and a talent contest. Other Fourth of July events include the annual parade which runs through downtown and the fireworks display which is held at Streator High School.

"Roamer Cruise Night" is an annual cruise / car show held on Labor Day weekend in the downtown district that attracts over 600 cars and 18,000 attendees. Special features of the Cruise Night include a display of a Roamer which was built at a factory in Streator in 1917. Cruise Night was rained out in 2011 and 2012, leaving Streatorites hungry for 2013.

A Veterans Day observance is held on the morning of Veterans Day at Veterans Plaza.

Streator also has an annual event called Light Up Streator held on the first Saturday after Thanksgiving. Light Up Streator is a group of volunteers who place holiday decorations throughout the Streator area, most notably in City Park.

The Keeping Christmas Close to Home Parade of Lights is held the weekend after Thanksgiving in downtown Streator.

=== Media ===
Streator has one daily newspaper, The Times. The daily paper, published by the Small Newspaper Group Inc., in nearby Ottawa, provides the local news for the Ottawa, IL Micropolitan Statistical Area. Streator's original daily, The Times-Press News, merged with the Ottawa Daily Times in 2005. Television broadcasts are provided by stations in nearby Bloomington and Peoria. Local cable providers also air Chicago stations. Streator has three local radio stations: WSPL 1250 AM, which has a news/talk format, WSTQ 97.7 FM, which has a contemporary pop format and WYYS 106.1 FM, which broadcasts a classic hits format. The three stations are owned by the Mendota Broadcast Group, Inc. One of the longest-running programs on WSPL was "Polka Party", which was broadcast live on Saturday mornings for more than thirty years until its host Edward Nowotarski retired in 2001.

== Parks and recreation ==
The city of Streator maintains eight local parks and one public golf course.

Spring Lake Park is a 37.2-acre (15.1 ha) city-owned park 1.8 miles (2.9 km) west of the Streator city limits (and 1.3 miles (2.1 km) north of Illinois Route 18). The park has two creeks, waterfalls and six trails. It offers hiking, horseback riding and picnicking. In September 2008, Spring Lake Park received the Governor's Hometown Award from the state of Illinois in recognition of its volunteer-led restoration project.

City Park is the main park in Streator's downtown area; a section of Streator City Park called Veterans Plaza contains memorials bearing the names of citizens who gave their lives for their country in the Civil War and in later wars. The park is also home to the Reuben G. Soderstrom Plaza, a monument dedicated to former Illinois AFL-CIO President and Streator native Reuben Soderstrom. City Park is the site of annual events including Streator Park Fest (successor to Heritage Days), held on Memorial Day weekend; the Roamer Cruise Night, held on Labor Day weekend; and the annual Light Up Streator celebration and display held each November. Patriotic observances use the park's Veterans Plaza on Memorial Day and Veterans Day. The park is also the site of other events, including concerts. In 2012, construction began in the southwest quadrant of City Park on a new venue suitable for concerts; it was later announced that this would be called Plumb Pavilion (in honor of Streator's first mayor, Ralph Plumb).

Marilla Park, located at the northeast end of Streator, is among Streator's larger parks, and includes picnic areas and a playground area. In 2012, a Disc Golf Course was added to Marilla Park.

Other city parks in Streator include Oakland Park, Central Park, Bodznick Park, Merriner Park, and Southside Athletic Park.

=== Local sports ===
Organized local sports activities include a youth football league, American Youth Soccer Organization, Little League Baseball, and American Legion Baseball. The Streator High School "Bulldogs" and Woodland High School "Warriors" participate in the Interstate Eight Conference and the Tri-County Conferences, respectively, which are part of the Illinois High School Association. Local golf is played at the city-owned Anderson Field Municipal Golf Course and The Eastwood Golf Course

The Streator Zips won the Illinois State Championship for Mickey Mantle baseball in 1994, 2003 and 2004.

Streator was represented in the Illinois–Missouri League, an American minor league baseball league, from 1912 through 1914. The Streator Speedboys had a record of 45–65 and finished last in 1912. In 1913, The Streator Boosters were in fourth place with a 30–57 record, and in 1914 the Boosters had a record of 40–48, again finishing in fourth place. The Streator Boosters competed in the Bi-State League in 1915. When the league disbanded in the middle of the season, the Streator Boosters were in first place with a record of 30 wins and 18 losses.

In 2008, the Streator Reds, an age 16-and-under team, won the Senior League Illinois State Tournament defeating the team from Burbank, Illinois. The Reds then qualified for the Senior League Regional Tournament in Columbia, Missouri, where they were eliminated in the first round with a 2–2 record.

Three local residents have had notable success in professional sports. Doug Dieken played 14 seasons for the Cleveland Browns in the National Football League from 1971 to 1984. He was selected to the Pro Bowl in 1980, and named a "Cleveland Brown Legend" by the team in 2006. He serves as a color commentator on Browns radio broadcasts. Bob Tattersall (1924–1971) was known as the "King of Midget Car Racing" in the 1950s and 1960s in both the US and Australia. Tattersall had a long list of victories, including the 1960, 1962, 1966 and 1969 Australian Speedcar Grand Prix (Midgets are known as Speedcars in Australia), while his crowning achievement was when he won the 1969 USAC National Midget Series. He died of cancer at his home in Streator in 1971. Also, in 2009, Clay Zavada made his professional debut as a relief pitcher for the Arizona Diamondbacks. Other local residents who have enjoyed careers in Major League Baseball include Andy Bednar (pitcher, Pittsburgh Pirates), Rube Novotney (catcher, Chicago Cubs) and Adam Shabala (outfielder, San Francisco Giants).

The Streator 10-year-old All-Stars took home the city's first Little League State Baseball Championship in 2002 versus Chicago (Ridge Beverly). After winning district and sectional championships, the state tournament finals was held in Utica, Illinois. The 12-year-old team from Streator competed in the World Series in 2012.

=== Outdoor recreation ===
Outdoor recreation activities in the Streator area primarily center around the Vermilion River, Spring Lake Park (located on the west side of the city) and nearby state parks. Fishing, kayaking and canoeing are popular activities along the Vermilion River. Matthiessen State Park and Starved Rock State Park offer hiking, hunting, camping and other amenities in their geologically diverse areas.

== Law and government ==
The city operates under a City Manager form of government. Elected officials include its mayor, Tara Bedei, and the four members of the city council: David Reed, Daniel Danko, Tim Geary, and Scott Scheuer, who meet monthly.

The Streator Police Department is headquartered in City Hall. The first chief of police was Martin Malloy (1840–1911). Led by Chief of Police, Robert Turner Jr., the current department has a staff of 19 patrol officers, 1 school resource officer, 3 investigators, and 1 administrative assistant who all oversee the city's law enforcement operations. 911 Center has since been consolidated with Livingston County Dispatch.

The Streator Fire Department is headed by Chief Garry Bird and serviced by a staff of fifteen firefighters. Firefighters work a traditional 24 on/48 off schedule.

Streator's Public Works Department oversees the maintenance and operation of the city's public infrastructure including roadways, sanitation, parks and fleet.

The unincorporated portions of South Streator are served by the Livingston County Sheriff's Office in Pontiac. The unincorporated portions of Otter Creek and Eagle Townships in LaSalle County are served by LaSalle County Sheriff's Office in Ottawa. Fire protection services for unincorporated portions of Streator are provided by Reading Township Fire Department in the south, east and west. Grand Ridge Fire Department covers fire services for the northern unincorporated areas.

Streator is located entirely within Illinois's 16th congressional district, currently represented by Congressman Darin LaHood (R-Peoria). After the 2021 decenial reapportionment for the Illinois General Assembly, Streator is located in the 53rd Legislative District, 105th Representative District, and 106th Representative District. As of September 15, 2023, these are represented in the by Senator Tom Bennett (R-Gibson City), Representative Dennis Tipsword (R-Metamora), and Representative Jason Bunting (R-Emington), respectively.

== Education ==
Streator is served by three school districts. Streator Elementary School District serves two elementary schools: Centennial Elementary School and Kimes Elementary School, and one junior high school, Northlawn Junior High School. Streator Township High School District serves just one school, Streator Township High School. The Woodland Community Unit School District #5, which serves the Livingston County portion of Streator, serves one high school, Woodland High School, and one combination elementary/junior high school, Junior High and Elementary School. Streator has one parochial elementary school, St. Anthony's Catholic School, now known as St. Michael the Archangel. Nearby Illinois Valley Community College is located in Oglesby, Illinois. The Carnegie Foundation funded the Streator Public Library, which opened in 1903. It was added to the National Register of Historic Places in 1996.

== Infrastructure ==
=== Transportation ===
Streator is served by Illinois State Routes 23 and 18, which intersect in downtown. Streator is isolated in that it is located at least a 15-minute drive from the nearest US interstate highway. Rail service is provided by Norfolk Southern Railway, BNSF Railway and the Illinois Railway. The city of Streator does not provide a mass transit system. Amtrak and AT&SF previously served Streator at Streator Station.

== Notable people ==
- Burt Baskin, co-established the Baskin-Robbins chain of ice cream parlors with Irv Robbins
- Kevin Chalfant, lead singer of The Storm and former live performance member of Journey.
- Mary Lee Robb Cline, actress, known as Marjorie in the radio program The Great Gildersleeve
- Phillipe Cunningham, Minneapolis City Council Member, one of the first openly transgender men to be elected to public office in the United States. He was born in Streator and lived there until the age of 18.
- "Mad Sam" DeStefano, infamous Chicago Outfit gangster, was born in Streator
- Doug Dieken, an offensive tackle with the Cleveland Browns, was born in Streator in 1949
- Doriot Anthony Dwyer, flutist, first woman named Principal Chair of a major US Orchestra.
- Thurlow Essington (1886–1964), Illinois state senator and mayor of Streator
- George "Honey Boy" Evans, songwriter (In the Good Old Summer Time)
- Richard Godfrey, mayor of Normal, Illinois (1976–1985)
- Fred J. Hart (1908–1983), Illinois state legislator
- Edward Hugh Hebern, was an early inventor of rotor machines, devices for encryption
- Dick Jamieson, pro football coach, was born in Streator
- William Jungers, chairman of Department of Anatomical Sciences at Stony Brook University Medical Center.
- John L. Keeley Sr., Chicago surgeon and personal physician to two Chicago cardinals.
- Patrick Lucey, Illinois Attorney General, Mayor of Streator
- Bob Morris, State Representative of Indiana House of Representatives (2010–present)
- Clarence E. Mulford, author (Hopalong Cassidy)
- Ed Plumb, musical director for Disney's Fantasia and score composer for Bambi
- Levancia Holcomb Plumb, president and chief stockholder of the Union National Bank of Streator
- Ralph Plumb, first mayor of Streator (1882–1885), and a U.S. Representative from Illinois (1885–1889)
- Ken Sears, catcher for the New York Yankees and St. Louis Browns; born in Streator
- Adam Shabala, outfielder for the San Francisco Giants
- Reuben G. Soderstrom, President of the Illinois State Federation of Labor and Illinois AFL-CIO from 1930 to 1970.
- Clyde Tombaugh, astronomer, discovered Pluto in 1930.
- Charles Turzak, artist
- Clay Zavada, pitcher for the St. Louis Cardinals and Arizona Diamondbacks
