= Reuben G. Soderstrom =

American politician (1888–1970)

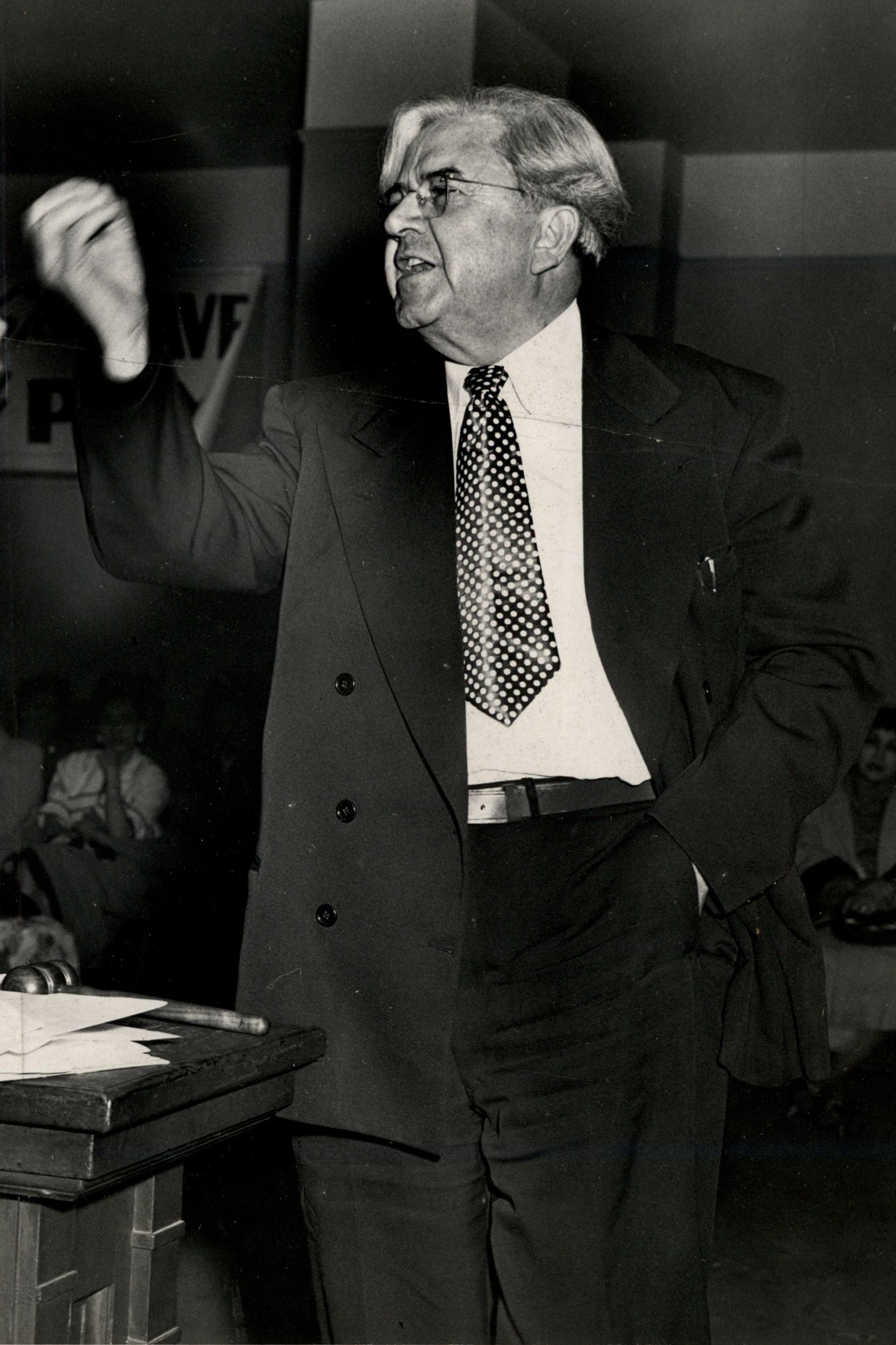
- Soderstrom speaking in 1954

1st President of the Illinois AFL-CIO
- In office 1958–1970
- Preceded by: new organization
- Succeeded by: Stanley Johnson

22nd President of the Illinois State Federation of Labor
- In office 1930–1958
- Preceded by: R.G. Fitchie
- Succeeded by: organization dissolved

Member of the Illinois House of Representatives
- In office 1918–1920
- Preceded by: Ole Benson
- Succeeded by: John Wylie
- In office 1922–1936
- Preceded by: John Wylie
- Succeeded by: Jeremiah Wlash

Personal details
- Born: Reuben George Soderstrom; March 10, 1888 Waverly, Minnesota, U.S.
- Died: December 15, 1970 (aged 82) Streator, Illinois, U.S.
- Party: Bull Moose (before 1918); Republican (1918–1936); Unaffiliated (1937-1970)
- Spouse: Jeanne Shaw (m. 1912; died 1951)
- Children: Carl; Rose Jeanne
- Occupation: Linotypist, labor leader

Reuben George Soderstrom (March 10, 1888 – December 15, 1970) was an American leader of organized labor who served as President of the Illinois State Federation of Labor (ISFL) and Illinois AFL-CIO from 1930 to 1970. A key figure in Chicago and Illinois politics, he also played a pivotal role in American labor history by helping to define national labor policy after the formation of the AFL–CIO in 1955. Soderstrom advised and was courted by multiple U.S. presidents seeking his endorsement and the votes of the over 1.3 million laborers he represented. The longest-serving state federation chief in American labor history, he passed seminal labor legislation and increased his organization's membership five-fold, transforming it into one of the most powerful labor bodies in the United States.

== Early life ==
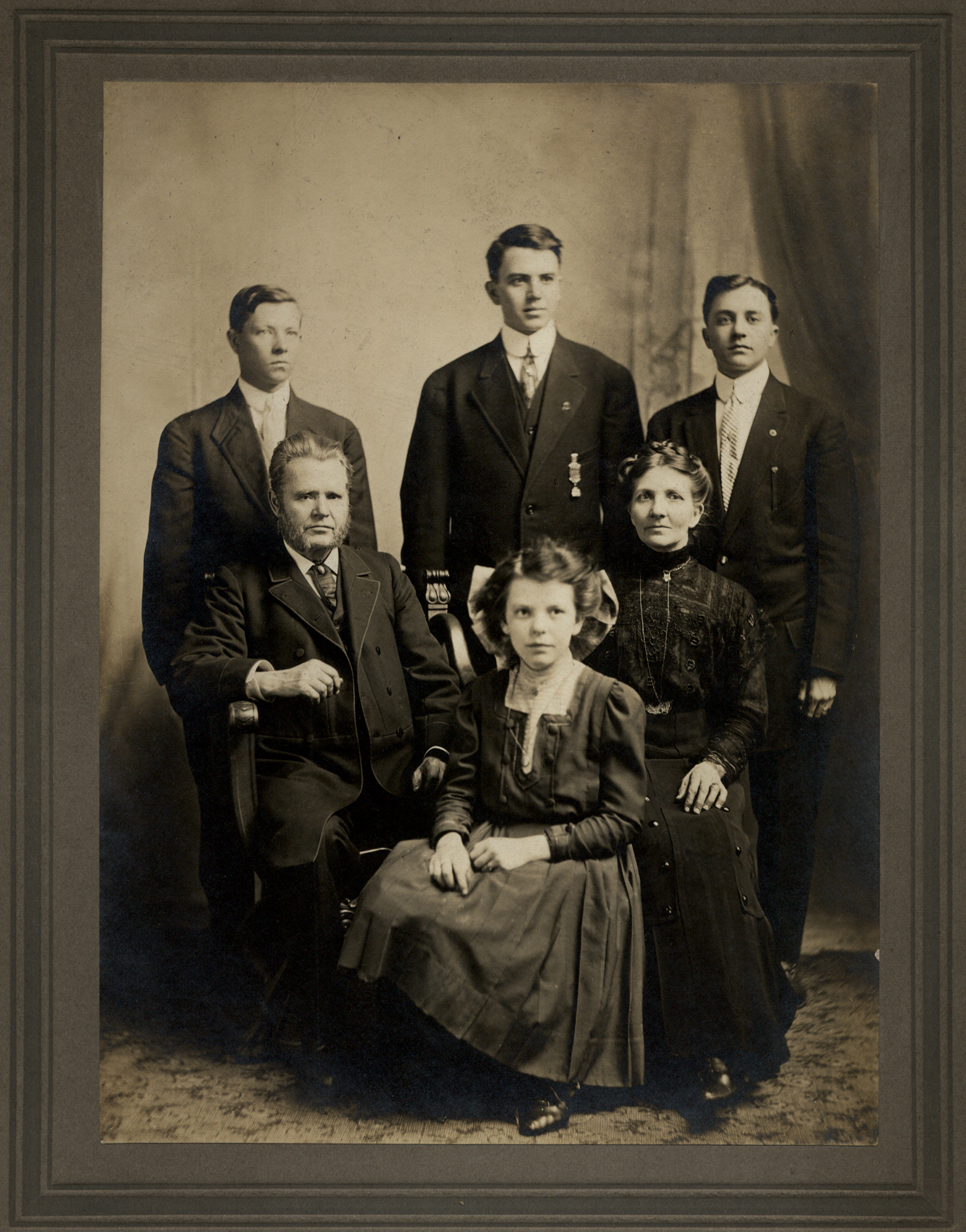
The Soderstrom family, 1904. Standing (from left): Paul, Reuben, and Lafe. Seated: John, Olga, and Anna.

Reuben Soderstrom was born on March 10, 1888, on a small farm west of Waverly, Minnesota. He was the second of six children born to John Frederick Soderstrom and Anna Gustafava Erikson, Swedish immigrants from Småland, and Jämtland, respectively. John, a free church preacher and cobbler by trade, attempted to become a farmer. He leveraged the family's assets in 1886 to purchase land, seed, and equipment. His efforts met with failure, and within ten years, the Soderstrom family was mired in debt.

In 1898, John sent ten-year-old Reuben to work for a blacksmith in neighboring Cokato, Minnesota, to pay the family's arrears. Two years later, Reuben traveled alone to the mining town of Streator, Illinois, in search of better wages. He labored on the trolley lines and in the glass factories, which proved formative experiences. "People often ask me what moved him, what things in his life made him choose to devote his life to the Labor Movement," his sister Olga later wrote. "He knew poverty, firsthand, he experienced child labor. He knew the loneliness of separation from his family at such an early age. These were his formative years, and they were not happy ones."

Eventually, Soderstrom earned enough money to move his parents and siblings to Streator. At 16, he became a printer's devil at the Streator Independent Times, where he came under the tutelage of John E. Williams, a columnist and an early leader of the labor movement in Illinois. He introduced Soderstrom to the works of many organized labor theorists, economists, and activists including John Mitchell, Richard Ely, and William U’Ren.

Soderstrom pursued a career as a union linotypist, apprenticing throughout the Midwest from St. Louis, Missouri, to Madison, Wisconsin, to Chicago, Illinois. He returned to Streator in 1909, establishing himself professionally, and marrying Jeanne Shaw on December 2, 1912. He also assumed full financial responsibility for his mother and sister after his father's death that year.

== Political career ==
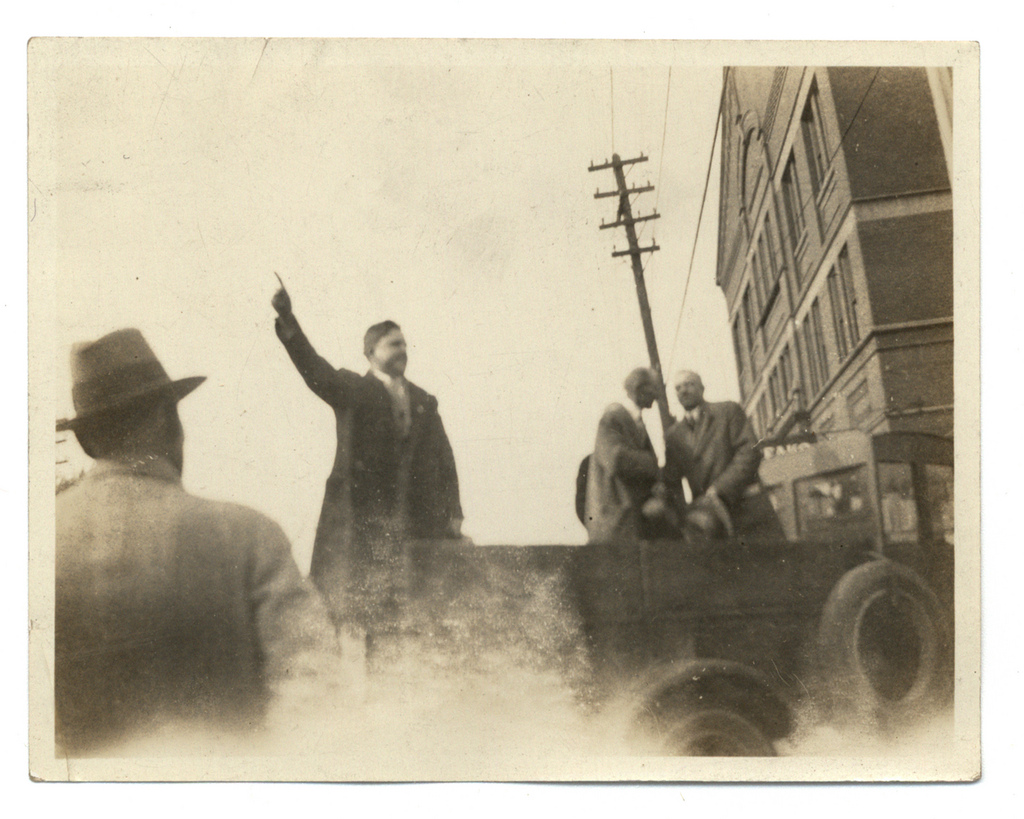
Reuben Soderstrom stumping with vice-presidential candidate Franklin Roosevelt in Mendota, Illinois, 1920

Soderstrom joined Streator ITU Local 328 and soon became a fixture in the city's labor movement. In 1910, he was elected to his Local's Executive Committee and was nominated as a delegate to the city's Trades and Labor Council. In 1912, he was elected President of both his Local and the Streator Trades and Labor Council. After retiring from the Presidency in 1920 he became the Labor Council's Reading Clerk, a position that he held until 1936.

In 1914, Soderstrom made his first run for public office, campaigning for Illinois State Representative as a member of ex-President Theodore Roosevelt's Progressive Party. Although ultimately unsuccessful, Reuben was introduced to the state political scene. Four years later, he was elected to the Illinois House of Representatives as a member of the Republican Party. After a 1920 loss largely attributed to his opposition to Prohibition, Soderstrom reclaimed the office in 1922 and held it without interruption for 14 years.

Soderstrom soon earned a reputation as organized labor's strongest advocate in the Illinois House. He authored and shepherded a series of pro-labor bills through the legislature, including the Injunction Limitation Act (1925), the Anti-"Yellow Dog" Contract Act (1933), the One Day Rest in Seven Act (1935), and the Old Age Pension Act (1935). He increased education funding, and helped found the University of Illinois Institute of Labor and Industrial Relations, known today as the Illinois School of Labor and Employment Relations. He also secured favorable amendments to the workmen's compensation, occupational disease, and pension laws.

In 1923, he led the campaign in Streator against the National Association of Manufacturers' anti-labor "American Plan." The historically-organized city became a central front in the NAM's bid to end unions in America, with Illinois Manufacturers' Association (IMA) chief J.M. Glenn leading the charge. Under his direction, the LaSalle County sheriff flooded the streets with deputized IMA-funded armed "patrols." While ostensibly charged with keeping the peace, the "imported thugs" were accused of intimidating striking workers and breaking up peaceful demonstrations by force. When Soderstrom and his fellow Labor Council members protested, they were issued injunctions and charged with conspiracy. While the sanctions and threat of prison were severe, Soderstrom's resistance earned him statewide and national attention. During the course of events he was introduced to American Federation of Labor leader Samuel Gompers, who encouraged him to persevere and counseled him, "Young man, you know you can climb the highest mountain if you've got the patience to do it one step at a time."

In 1936, Soderstrom threw his full support behind President Franklin D. Roosevelt. When polling showed Roosevelt losing Illinois to challenger the Alfred Landon 52% to 48%, he helped organize an unprecedented rally at the Chicago Stadium for Roosevelt that was later dubbed the "Meeting at the Madhouse." While Roosevelt won Illinois, Soderstrom lost his re-election, a defeat generally attributed to his support for the Democratic president. Though no longer a state representative, Soderstrom continued to serve as President of the ISFL and Illinois AFL-CIO.

From that point onward, he generally pursued the unaffiliated, non-partisan approach favored by the AFL founder Samuel Gompers (popularly known as "elect our friends") of endorsing both Republican and Democratic politicians throughout his tenure. Soderstrom became an advisor to several administrations on both the state and national level. He worked closely with Secretary of Labor Frances Perkins on President Roosevelt's National Conference on Labor Legislation during the Great Depression and World War II. He focused on workplace and public safety during the Eisenhower administration and joined President Eisenhower's conference on highway safety during the planning of the nation's interstate system. President John F. Kennedy aggressively sought Soderstrom's endorsement, inviting him to the white house. In 1964, President Lyndon B. Johnson became the first U.S. president to address a state labor convention in person, at Soderstrom's request.

== Presidency ==
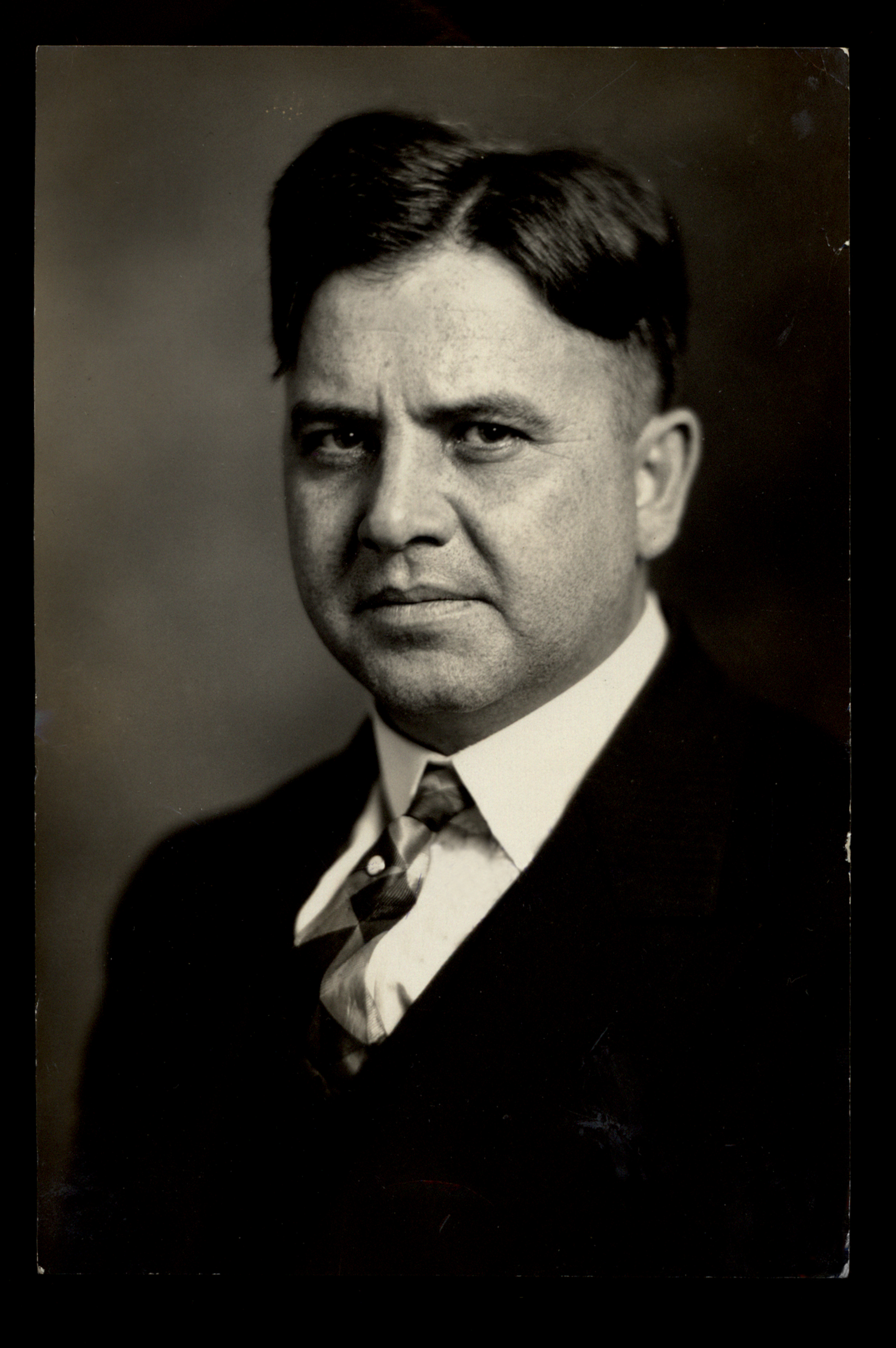
Portrait of Reuben Soderstrom, circa 1930

=== Miners' crisis ===
In 1930, the Illinois State Federation of Labor (ISFL) faced a crisis when its largest union, the United Mine Workers of America (UMWA), broke apart under the heavy-handed leadership of John L. Lewis. ISFL President John Walker, himself a UMWA member, was forced to resign after he and his Progressive Miners of America (PMA) withdrew from the UMWA and claimed to be the "legitimate" miners' union. As many as 85% of Illinois UMWA miners sided with Walker, and ISFL membership plummeted to under 200,000.

With no clear successor, the ISFL Executive Committee approached the 42-year-old Soderstrom in the hope that his political acumen could help stabilize the crisis. He accepted and was named interim president, pending a formal vote. Soderstrom acted decisively against the PMA despite his friendship with Walker by refusing to seat it at the 1930 ISFL Convention. The move marginalized the PMA and helped to stabilize the UMWA at a critical moment. Soderstrom was formally elected ISFL President soon thereafter.

=== Great Depression ===
Just as the miners' crisis began to abate, a larger threat emerged: the Great Depression. By 1933, one out of every four laborers were idle. Reuben combated the crisis with a mix of legislation, agitation, and recruitment. He fought for relief legislation, including unemployment insurance and a shorter work week and declared that every laborer had a "right to work which must not be taken away." He strengthened union efforts on the ground and traveled across Illinois to give support to strikes and organizing efforts. He also ran a relentless recruitment campaign by focusing not only on unorganized workers but also on established unions not previously affiliated with the ISFL. As a result, Soderstrom saw his membership surge despite the Great Depression and the formation of the Congress of Industrial Organizations (CIO), a rival to Reuben's American Federation of Labor (AFL).

Soderstrom also undertook efforts to combat organized crime and its influence on labor. Working closely with Chicago Federation of Labor President John Fitzpatrick, he sought to identify and arrest "labor racketeers," who falsely claimed to be representatives of organized labor to extort illegal "fees" from workers and businesses alike. His efforts earned him the ire of Illinois gangsters, who sabotaged his car and attempted to kidnap him.

=== World War II ===
During World War II, Soderstrom took the lead in helping to organize the home front. He joined and helped to enforce organized labor's no-strike pledge within defense industries. Illinois became a seat of the nation's wartime manufacturing by producing more than 246,845 planes, 75,000 tanks, 56,696 Navy vessels, 15,454,714 firearms, and over 37,000,000,000 rounds of ammunition. Reuben helped to oversee the efforts as a member of the War Production Board, the War Manpower Commission, and Illinois State Planning Commission. He placed special emphasis on worker safety and pushed back hard against overwork in the legislature and as a member of the Illinois Health and Safety Committee and the Advisory Committee for Industrial Safety. He raised money for the war, promoting War Bonds and serving on the Federal War Savings Committee. Near the war's end, he helped shape postwar planning efforts as a member of the AFL's Peace and Postwar Problems Committee.

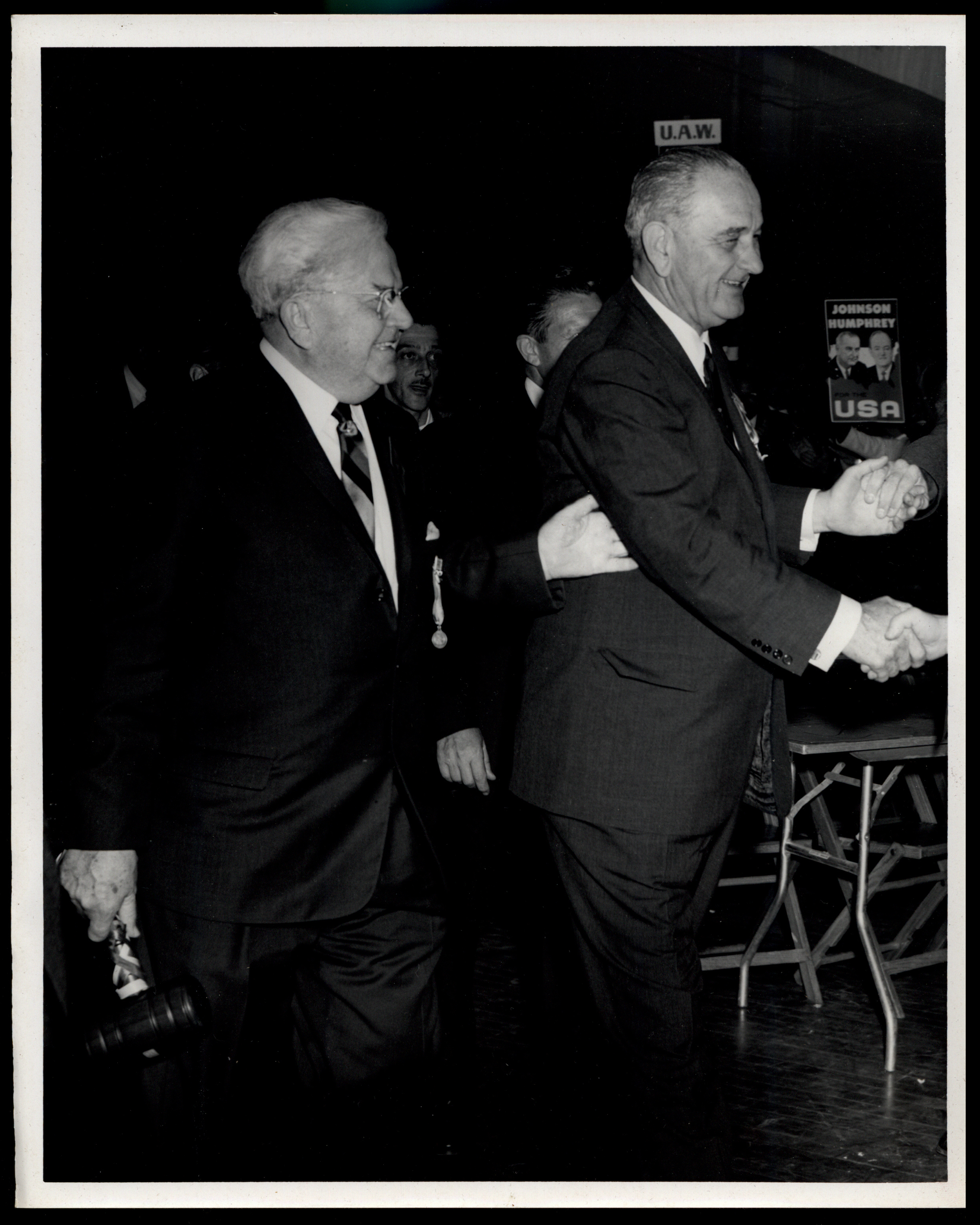
Reuben Soderstrom leads President Johnson to the stage at the 1964 Illinois AFL-CIO Convention

After the ear, Soderstrom advanced labor interests in Illinois while when anti-labor sentiment was rising nationwide. He passed pro-labor legislation, including affordable housing, increased workmen's compensation and unemployment benefits as well as the founding of a Labor Institute at the University of Illinois. He also thwarted repeated attempts to pass the model "right to work" legislation that swept through 16 other states. That was accomplished in part through an organized effort to curb strikes within the state and a new political alliance with one-time opponent Governor Green, who was considering running for the Republican presidential nomination.

=== AFL-CIO merger ===
Soderstrom's influence continued to expand in the postwar era. As a direct result of his efforts, Illinois was one of the only states not to be consumed by the wave of anti-labor legislation that shook the country in the late 1940s. Nationally, he exerted influence as Secretary of the AFL's powerful Resolutions Committee. He gained the personal confidence of national AFL President William Green, who repeatedly dispatched Reuben as his personal representative to resolve internal disputes across the country and represent the AFL abroad. When George Meany, Green's successor, began talks with his CIO counterpart to merge the two labor organizations, Soderstrom was one of the handful of leaders and the only state president selected to travel to help craft the agreement in Washington, D.C. When his own Illinois State Federation was merged with its CIO counterpart in 1958, Reuben was elected to be the first president of the new Illinois AFL-CIO.

=== Civil rights ===
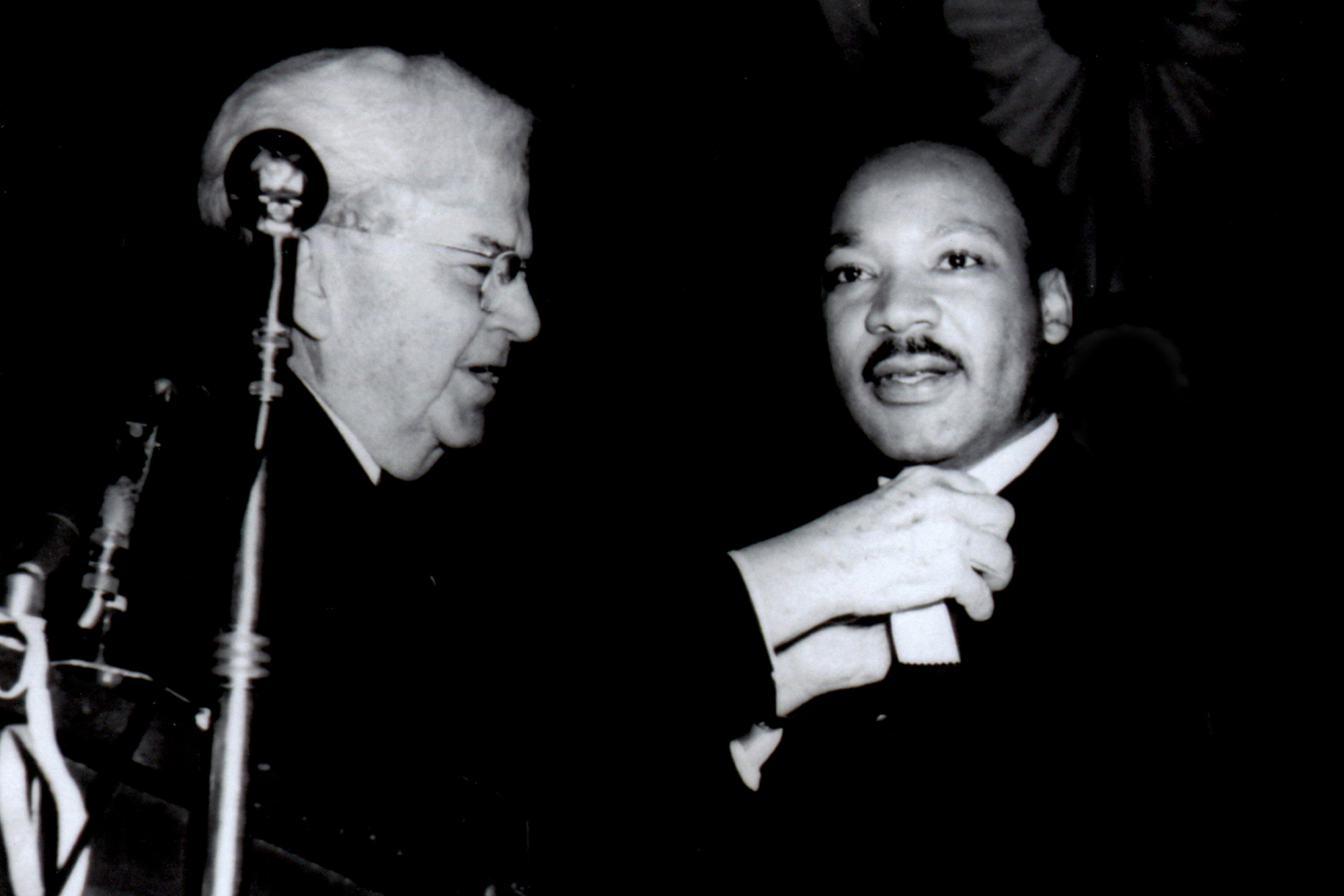
Reuben Soderstrom pinning a medallion on Dr. Martin Luther King Jr., at the 1965 Illinois AFL-CIO Convention

In the Civil Rights era, Reuben worked to bring equality into the workplace. He supported the Illinois Fair Employment Practices Committee (FEPC) Act and other legislative efforts to end discrimination. He strongly supported Jewish rights at home and efforts to organize in the nascent nation of Israel for which he was formally honored by the Jewish Labor Committee in 1953. When Martin Luther King Jr., led a Rally for Civil Rights in Chicago in 1964, Reuben served as an Honorary Chairman and welcomed him to Illinois. After the event, Reuben personally invited Dr. King to come and deliver the keynote address at the Illinois AFL-CIO Convention, which he did the following year. Multiple civil rights leaders spoke before the Illinois AFL-CIO at Reuben's request, including King' successor, Ralph Abernathy.

== Family ==
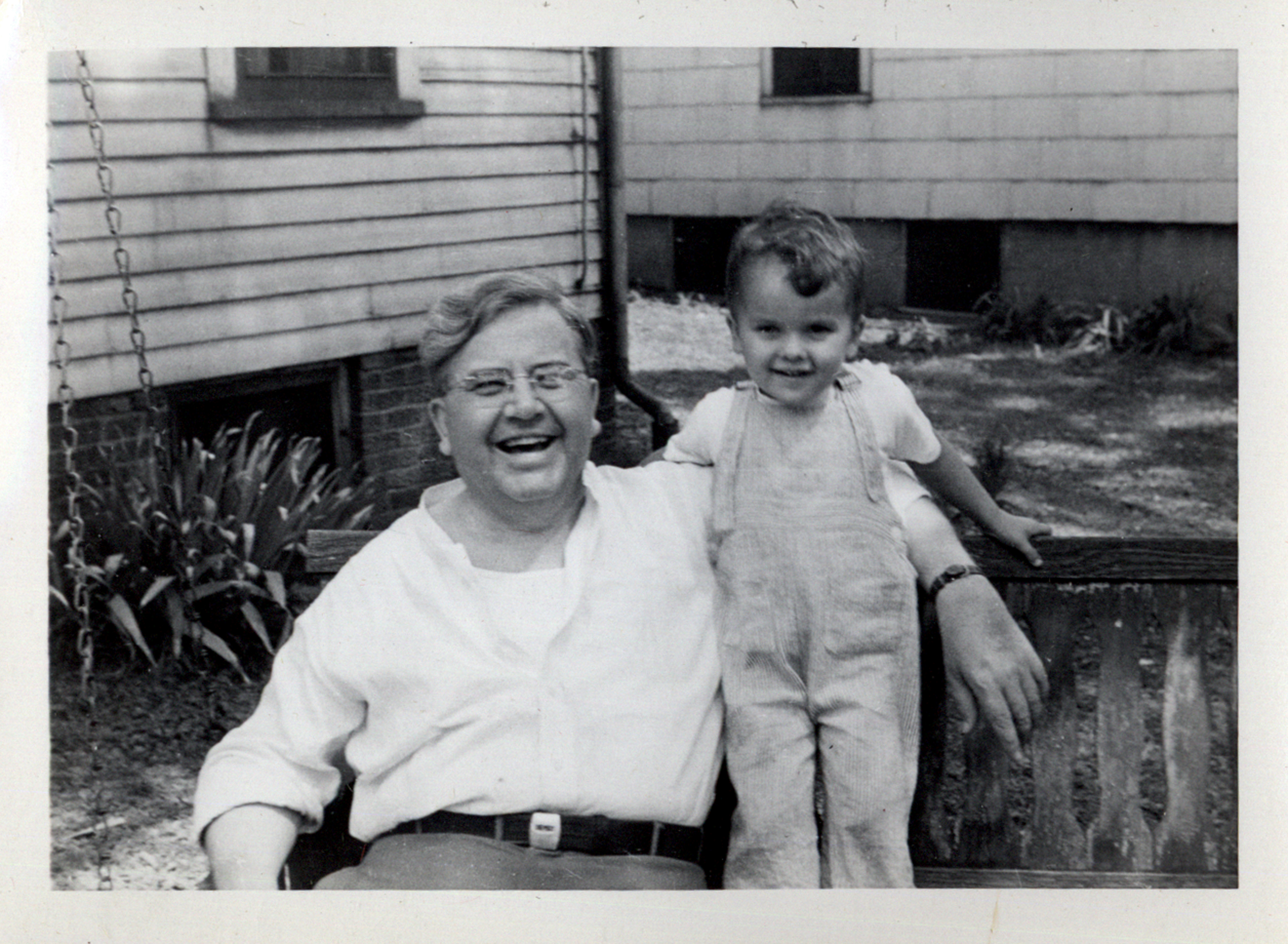
Reuben Soderstrom with his grandson, Carl Soderstrom Jr.

Soderstrom was the primary provider for his family since childhood and continued to care for his mother until her death in 1959. He was close to his siblings, especially his sister Olga and brothers Paul and Lafe, whose own career in labor politics was cut short when he was killed by a drunk driver in Chicago in 1940. He married Jeanne Shaw in 1912, and together, they had two children: Carl and Rose Jeanne. Carl followed in his father's footsteps by winning the Illinois House seat his father had held in 1950. His daughter, Jeanne, was a teacher and counselor at Streator High School. In 1941, Carl Soderstrom married Streator native Virginia Merriner. The pair had five children: Carl Jr., Virginia Jeanne, Robert, Jane, and William Reuben.

He was committed to the city of Streator and chose to commute to his offices in Chicago and Springfield, rather than leave his adopted hometown. On September 2, 2012, the city honored him with the dedication of the Reuben G. Soderstrom Statue and Memorial Plaza.

== Death and legacy ==
On September 12, 1970, Soderstrom was named president emeritus of the Illinois AFL-CIO. He died three months later on December 15, 1970, in his hometown of Streator, at the age of 82.

=== Forty Gavels Biography ===
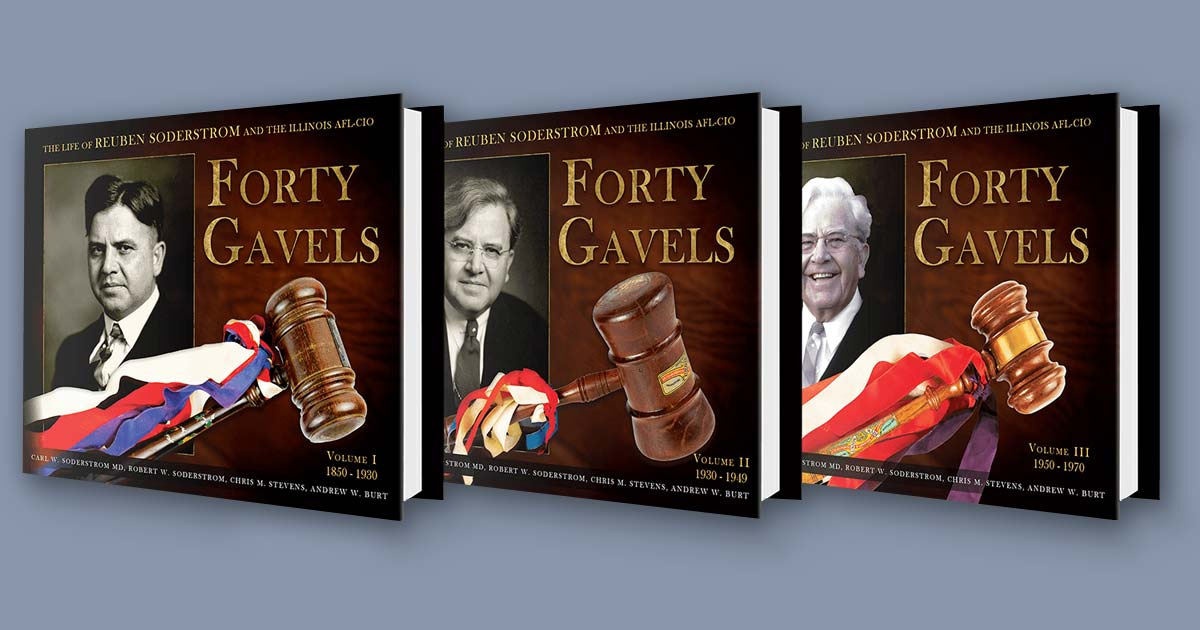
Forty Gavels, the three-volume biography of Reuben Soderstrom

Soderstrom's authoritative, three-volume biography Forty Gavels: The Life of Reuben Soderstrom and the Illinois AFL-CIO was released on February 28, 2018. Named after the ceremonial gavels Soderstrom received at the annual state labor conventions, Forty Gavels spans a century of history and examines its subject in documented detail, year by year. The biography also features more than 2,250 photos and images from several historical archives. Forty Gavels was written by Carl W. Soderstrom, Robert W. Soderstrom, Chris M. Stevens, and Andrew W. Burt, with graphic design by Kevin Evans. To date, the biographical series has won several awards including the 2019 Next Generation Indie Book Awards for Biography and Overall Design, the 2018 American BookFest Best Book Awards for Biography and Interior Design, and the 2018 National Indie Indie Excellence Award for Biography. In 2019, the full text of the book was released online.

=== Reuben G. Soderstrom Plaza ===
The Reuben G. Soderstrom Plaza was dedicated in Streator, Illinois on September 2, 2012. The date, officially proclaimed "Reuben Soderstrom Day" by Illinois Governor Pat Quinn, featured a day-long celebration and Labor Day Parade in which Soderstrom was posthumously honored as Grand Marshall. The Plaza features a bronze statue of Soderstrom by Peoria sculptor Lonnie Stewart, and is adorned by 12 plaques containing selected quotes from Soderstrom. The plaza was built through labor donated by David Raikes and the men and women of Laborers’ Local #393, Bricklayers #6 and #21, Electricians #176, Plumbers #130, Operating Engineers #150, Cement Masons #11 and the Illinois Valley Building Trades. Landscaping was provided by Jeff Berfeld.

=== Reuben G. Soderstrom Foundation ===
The Reuben G. Soderstrom Foundation, an organization "dedicated to preserving and promoting the work and vision of Illinois AFL-CIO President Reuben G. Soderstrom," was founded in 2017. The foundation hosts an expanding digital archive of textual and audiovisual records, and promotes works and endeavors commemorating the life and legacy of Reuben Soderstrom.

=== Streator Public Library ===
In 2017, the Streator Public Library, where the unschooled Reuben educated himself as a teenager, received a generous donation from the Reuben G. Soderstrom Foundation. The funds are being used to finance an extensive renovation of the library's reading room.

=== University of Illinois School of Labor Dedication ===
On September 13, 2019, the University of Illinois at Urbana-Champaign officially opened the Soderstrom Plaza, an outdoor commons connected to the School of Labor and Employment Relations (LER) featuring a statue of Reuben Soderstrom. The statue and the plaza, as well as an endowed professorship, were gifted by the Soderstrom Family Charitable Trust. The Petry Kuhne Co. also donated their time and work to set the statue in the plaza.
