= Brinsmade (surname) =

Brinsmade is a surname. Notable people with the surname include:

- Allen T. Brinsmade (1837–1913), American politician
- Peter A. Brinsmade (1804–1859), American-born businessman
- Thomas C. Brinsmade (1802–1868), American physician and academic administrator
