= Carl Soderstrom =

American politician (1915–2009)

Carl W. Soderstrom (December 14, 1915 – January 13, 2009) was an American politician who served as a Republican member of the Illinois House of Representatives.

== Biography ==
The son of Reuben Soderstrom and Jeanne Shaw, Carl Soderstrom was born December 14, 1915, in Streator, Illinois. After graduating from Streator Township High School, he earned a Bachelor of Science at the University of Illinois at Urbana–Champaign and a Juris Doctor at the University of Illinois College of Law. During World War II, he worked at the shipyards in Seneca, Illinois. A lifelong Republican, he was elected to the Illinois House of Representatives in 1950. He and his wife Virginia had five children. He died January 13, 2009.
