= John L. Keeley Jr. =

American investment manager

- Born: May 20, 1940; New Orleans, United States
- Died: June 4, 2015 (aged 75); Chicago
- Occupations: Investor, fund manager
- Spouse: Barbara Keeley
- Children: 4

John L. Keeley Jr. (May 20, 1940 – June 4, 2015) was an American investment manager and philanthropist. For almost 40 years, he ran Chicago-based Keeley Asset Management, which today is part of Keeley Teton Advisors, which is an affiliate of GAMCO Investors. Keeley and his family donated funds to help create the John L. Keeley Center for Financial Services at the DePaul University in Chicago and the Barbara G. & John L. Keeley, Jr. Center for Emergency Medicine Education at Loyola University Medical Center near Chicago.

== Early life and education ==
Born in New Orleans, Keeley was the son of John L. Keeley Sr., a longtime Chicago-area physician and surgeon who was chairman of the department of surgery at Loyola University Chicago's Stritch School of Medicine from 1958 until 1969.

Keeley grew up in Chicago's South Shore neighborhood and attended St. Phillip Neri grade school. He then attended Loyola Academy in Wilmette, Illinois, for high school. Keeley earned a bachelor's degree from the University of Notre Dame in 1962 and then earned an MBA in 1965 from the University of Chicago Graduate School of Business. He was awarded the chartered financial analyst designation in 1974.

== Professional career ==
Keeley began working in the investment industry in the 1960s as a securities analyst for the Chicago Corporation and then was in charge of research at the Chicago office of James Capel & Co., a London-based broker. After James Capel closed its Chicago office in 1974, Keeley helped found Seward Securities, where he researched equities and oversaw back-office operations.

After Seward was taken over by the Chicago firm Mesirow & Co. in 1976, Keeley decided to depart in 1977 to start his own registered broker/dealer, Keeley Investment Corporation, which provided research and brokerage services to a limited number of institutional and individual clients.

In 1982, Keeley founded Keeley Asset Management, an affiliated registered investment advisor.

Keeley's investing style was to focus on companies undergoing restructuring actions. As a result, he frequently invested in corporate spin-offs, post-bankruptcy reorganizations, wayward utilities, securities trading below book value and savings and loan demutualizations.

Keeley's investing style was successful, and the firm's flagship product, the Keeley Small Cap Value Fund mutual fund, was awarded a five-star rating — the highest grade — by fund tracker Morningstar in 2008. As a result, Keeley Asset Management's assets under management grew to more than $10 billion by the summer of 2008.

From 1997 until 2008, Keeley was one of four Chicago investment managers featured as part of the panel of local mutual fund managers whose stock picks were analyzed each quarter by the Chicago Tribune’s business reporters. Keeley was part of the panel from its 1997 inception until the Tribune discontinued the panel in 2008.

In July 2008, Keeley for the first time brought in an outside investor, Boston-based private equity firm TA Associates, which made a minority investment in Keeley Asset Management as a minority leveraged recapitalization. The remainder of the controlling interest in the company was sold to TA Associates in 2015, and in 2017, Keeley Asset Management merged with Teton Advisors, an affiliate of GAMCO Investors. Today the firm is known as Keeley Teton Advisors.

Keeley never retired from full-time investing work.

== Philanthropy ==
Keeley established the charitable Keeley Family Foundation in 1993, and in 2006 made a $2 million donation to what was then DePaul University’s College of Commerce to establish an endowed chair in investment management in the name of his late son, Christopher.

Keeley also helped fund a multimillion-dollar renovation of the emergency room of Loyola University Medical Center. The facility, which was completed in 2012, was named in honor of Keeley’s father, John L. Keeley Sr.

After Keeley's death, the Keeley Family Foundation and his family together gave a $3 million gift in 2018 to rename DePaul University's Center for Financial Services the John L. Keeley Center for Financial Services. The center was established in 2006 within DePaul's Department of Finance to bridge the gap between theory and practice, with the aim of connecting students and faculty with Chicago's financial services community.

In June 2022, Keeley's heirs donated more than $1 million to create the Barbara G. and John L. Keeley, Jr. Center or Emergency Medicine Education at Loyola University Medical Center.

== Personal life ==
Keeley was married to Barbara Keeley for more than 50 years. He had four children, John III, Mark, Kevin and Christopher. Christopher Keeley died in 2002 of a pulmonary embolism.

Keeley died on June 4, 2015, of complications from a blood clot.
