= Ruffin Drew Fletcher House =

Historic house in Illinois, United States

- U.S. National Register of Historic Places
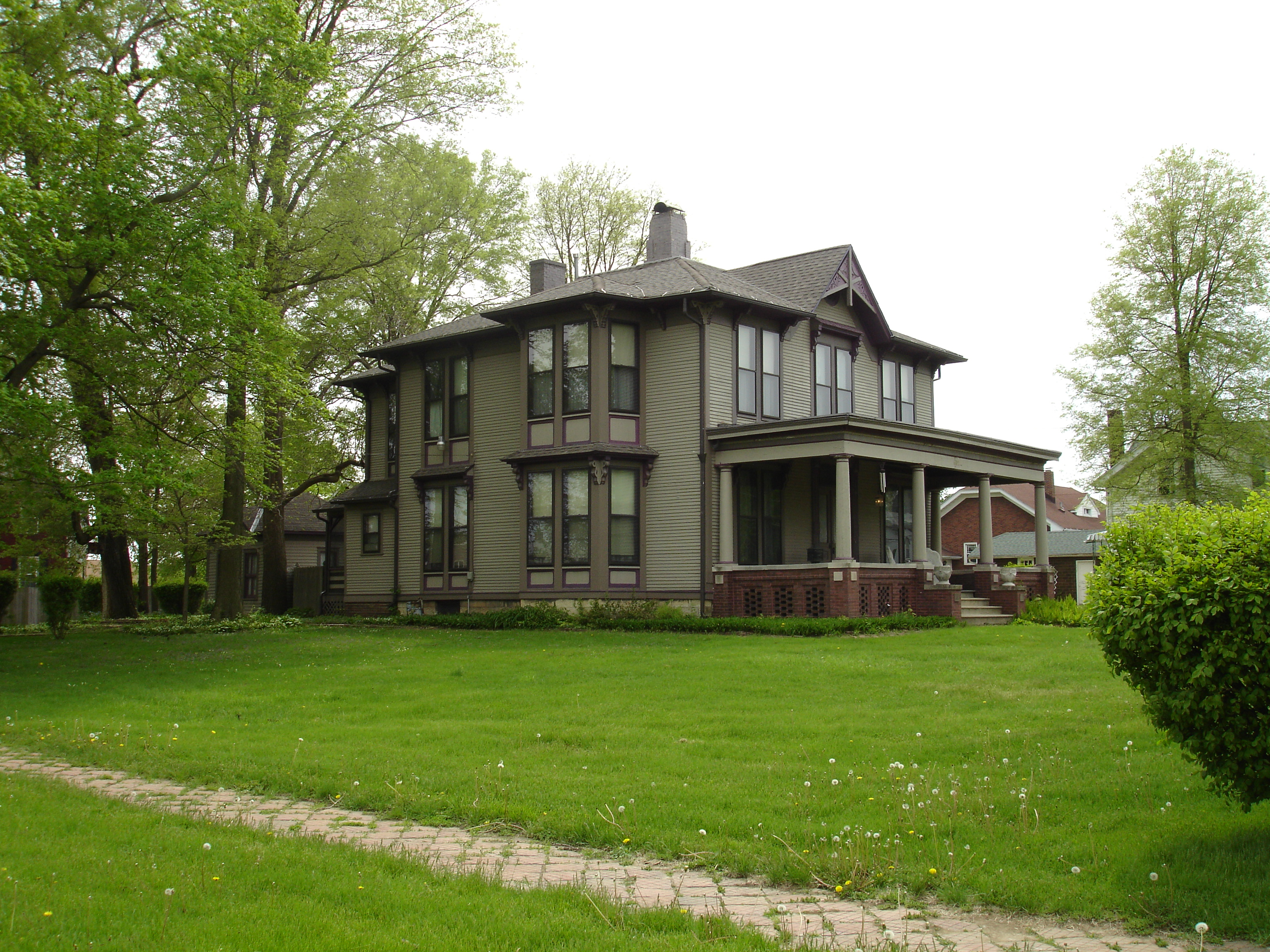

- Location within Illinois Location within the United States
- Location: 609 E. Broadway St., Streator, Illinois
- Coordinates: 41°7′31.5″N 88°49′40.4″W
- Area: less than one acre
- Built: 1890
- Architectural style: Stick style
- NRHP reference No.: 91001000
- Added to NRHP: August 5, 1991

The Ruffin Drew (R. D.) Fletcher House, also known as the George Allen Dicus, M.D., House, is a historic house in the city of Streator, Illinois. It was constructed in 1890 and is a good example of stick-style architecture. The house was added to the U.S. National Register of Historic Places in 1991.

== History ==
The Ruffin Drew Fletcher, or simply R. D. Fletcher, House was constructed in 1890. Ruffin Drew Fletcher took a job with the Chicago, Wilmington and Vermilion Coal Company in 1876 and moved to Streator, Illinois. The coal company constructed the house for Fletcher and he stayed in it until 1900 when he was transferred to another location and the house was sold to Dr. George Dicus.

== Architecture ==
The Fletcher House shows the characteristics of Victorian stick-style architecture in its decorative ornamentation and roof massing. It falls into a subcategory of stick-style houses that Virginia and Lee McAlester described as the gabled roof classification in their Field Guide to American Houses. The Fletcher House contains many of the specific elements described by the McAlesters.

== Outbuildings ==
There are two outbuildings on the property, a one-story wash house and a two-story carriage house. Both structures were built at the same time as the house and also in the stick style. The outbuildings lack the ornamentation of the house but still contribute to the architectural significance of the Fletcher House.

== Historic significance ==
The Fletcher House maintains its 1890s architectural integrity. On a local level, the earliest changes to the house, such as the installation of electric fans, illustrates the life style of the upper middle class in Streator, Illinois. The Ruffin Drew Fletcher House was added to the National Register of Historic Places on August 5, 1991. Both outbuildings were included as contributing properties in the National Register listing.
