= Silas Williams House =

Historic house in Illinois, United States

- U.S. National Register of Historic Places
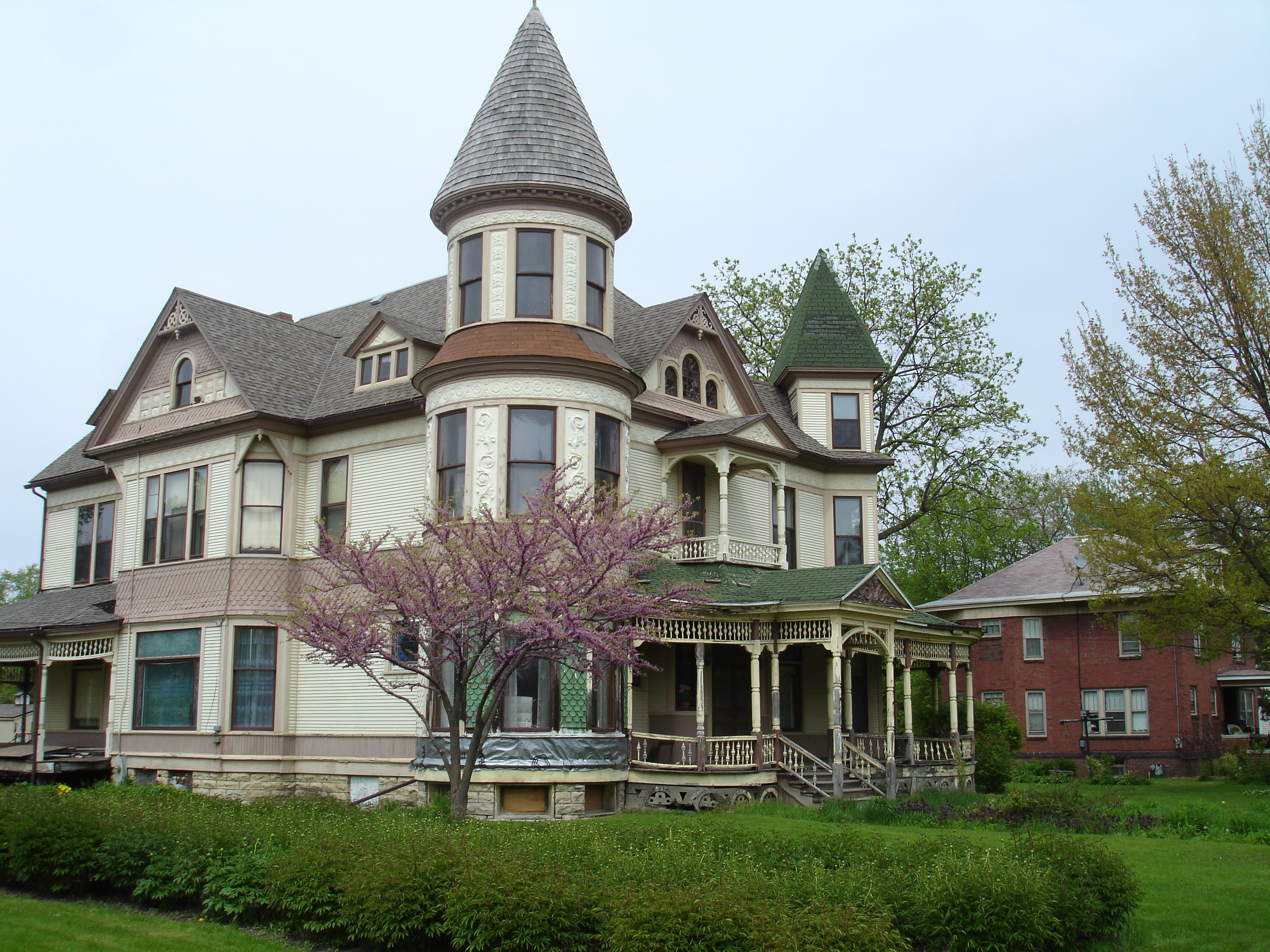

- Location within Illinois Location within the United States
- Location: 702 E. Broadway, Streator, Illinois
- Coordinates: 41°7′29″N 88°49′32″W
- Area: 0.3 acres (0.12 ha)
- Built: c. 1893
- Architect: Silas Williams (builder)
- Architectural style: Queen Anne style
- NRHP reference No.: 76002146
- Added to NRHP: June 23, 1976

The Silas Williams House, also known as the Edward Baker House, is a historic Queen Anne house in the city of Streator, Illinois. The building was added to the U.S. National Register of Historic Places in 1976.

== History ==
The Silas Williams House was built by its first owner, Silas Williams, around 1893. Williams, originally from Ottawa, Illinois, was a paper mill owner who also owned many properties throughout Streator. He constructed many homes around the city.

== Architecture ==
The Williams House is a two-story frame building with a full basement and an attic. It is cast in the Queen Anne style of architecture. It contains many projecting and receding forms, common of Queen Anne houses. Some of those include its multiple gables, and its polygonal and round and towers. The interior is largely open on the first floor and much of the interior details and woodwork remain intact.

== Historic significance ==
The Williams House has two main areas of importance, architecture and local history. As one of the last "great" 19th-century houses in Streator, it stands as a symbol to its builder and his accomplishments in early Streator. The house is also important architecturally. Its open floor plan carries the Queen Anne style further than any other house in the state of Illinois. The Silas Williams House was added to the National Register of Historic Places on June 23, 1976, with NRHP reference #76002146.
