= Worthy S. Streator =

American politician (1816–1902)

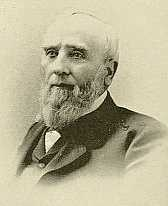

Member of the Ohio Senate from the 25th district
- In office 1870–1872
- Preceded by: David A. Dangler
- Succeeded by: Benjamin R. Bevis and Allen T. Brinsmade

Personal details
- Born: October 16, 1816 Hamilton, New York, U.S.
- Died: March 6, 1902 (aged 85) Cleveland, Ohio U.S.
- Resting place: Lake View Cemetery; Cleveland, Ohio, U.S.
- Party: Republican
- Spouse: Sarah Wakeley Sterling (m. 1839)
- Relations: Ralph Plumb (cousin)
- Children: 5
- Occupation: Railroad promoter; coal mine developer; politician; physician
- Mayor: East Cleveland, Ohio
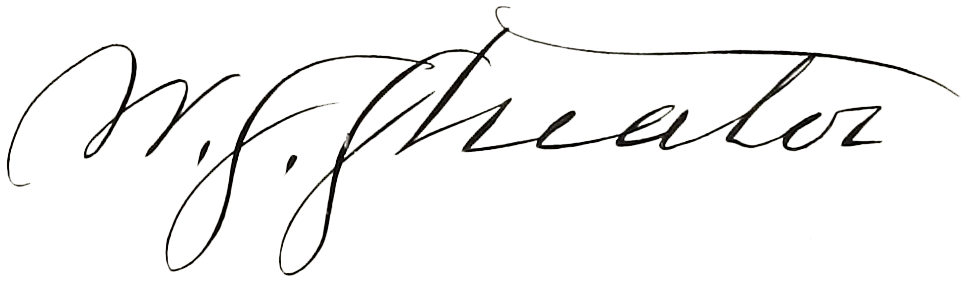
- Signature

Worthy Stevens Streator (October 16, 1816 – March 6, 1902) was an American physician, railroad developer, industrialist and entrepreneur after whom the city of Streator, Illinois, is named. He was instrumental in the creation of the Atlantic and Great Western Railway in Ohio, was president of the Baltimore and Ohio Railroad (B&O), and financed the first large-scale coal mine operation in Northern Illinois in 1866. He served as an Ohio State Senator from 1870 to 1872, and was the first mayor of East Cleveland, Ohio. He was an influential in the development of many civic institutions in his home city of Cleveland, Ohio. He co-founded the Christian Standard magazine, he was an original endower of Case School of Applied Science and was a principal in the creation of the James A. Garfield Monument; the first true mausoleum created in the United States in honor of President James A. Garfield. He was a pallbearer at President Garfield's funeral in 1881.

== Background ==
Born in Hamilton, Madison County, New York, on October 16, 1816, Streator was a descendant of Stephen Streeter, who emigrated to Gloucester, Massachusetts, in 1642, whose lineage traces back to the 15th century in Kent, England. His great-grandfather, John Streator, served in the American Revolutionary War as a private in the Berkshire County, Massachusetts, Militia. At age eighteen he entered medical school and upon graduation moved to Aurora, Ohio, in 1838. In 1839 he married Sarah Wakeley Sterling, of Lyman, New York. They had five children; Helen Gertrude (born May 20, 1842), Sterling Rush (born December 31, 1845), Henry Doolittle (born August 26, 1851), Edward H. (born August 20, 1855) and Harold Arthur (born August 5, 1861). By 1850, Streator moved to Cleveland, Ohio, and retired from medicine.

== Railroads ==
Once in Cleveland and removed from the practice of medicine, Streator embarked on his second career in developing railroads. With his partner, Henry Doolittle, their firm built the Greenville and Medina Railroad. In 1853 they contracted for the construction of the 244 miles (393 km) Atlantic and Great Western Railroad in Ohio. Work continued on this and other ancillary lines of the railroad until completion in 1861, when he sold his unfinished contracts upon the death of Doolittle.

In 1862 he began plans for the Oil Creek Railroad, which would bring newly discovered oil from the Oil Creek fields in western Pennsylvania to the town of Corry, Pennsylvania. This highly coveted railroad was a great financial success for Streator. The public's interest in the oil fields was so great that crowds gathered to view the oil being loaded onto the railcars. By 1866, Streator sold his interest in the Oil Creek line to the New York Central Railroad. He then began construction of a new line from Corry to New York Central's Buffalo and Erie Railroad line in Brocton, New York.

== Vermilion Coal Company ==
Upon completion of the Corry to Brocton railroad line, Streator suspended his involvement in rails and began a third career developing coal mines on the Vermilion River in North-Central Illinois. While it is unclear as to whether Streator or his cousin, Col. Ralph Plumb learned first of the vast, untapped coal fields on the banks of the Vermilion River, Streator gathered other investors and formed the Vermilion Coal Company in 1866 with Streator as its president and Plumb as the Business Manager. Plumb and Streator "invited" Streator's friend, then Ohio Congressman, James A. Garfield to sign on as an investor. In return, Garfield was expected to work with Robert C. Schenck, then the president of the American Central railroad, in getting the railroad to "bend their lines" to the coal mine in the area known as Hardscrabble in LaSalle County, Illinois. Eventually the plan did not work. The Vermilion Company then made arrangements with the Fox River line for their needed rail service. The company purchased 3,000 acres (12 km^{2}) of land and dispatched Col. Plumb to begin work. Plumb surveyed the area for the incoming Fox River Line, platted the land for the new town and commenced to build a total of eight mine shafts. Plumb needed laborers for his mines, but the Vermilion Coal Company was unable to afford European employment agents. Instead, it alerted steamship offices of the new job opportunities and convinced local railroads to carry notices of Vermilion Coal's promise. Scottish, English, Welsh, German and Irish immigrants came to the area first, followed later by scores of mostly Slovaks. Czechs, Austrians and Hungarians came in lesser numbers.

The coal operation was an immediate success due to the increasing appetite for coal in the United States. In 1870, the Dwight Division of the Chicago and Alton Railroad was commenced. The Chicago, Pekin and Southwestern rail line came next and was followed by the Chicago and Paducah railroad. This increase in rail construction gave the region unparalleled advantages in shipping. By 1877, the Vermilion Coal Company employed 1,200 miners.

== Streator, Illinois ==
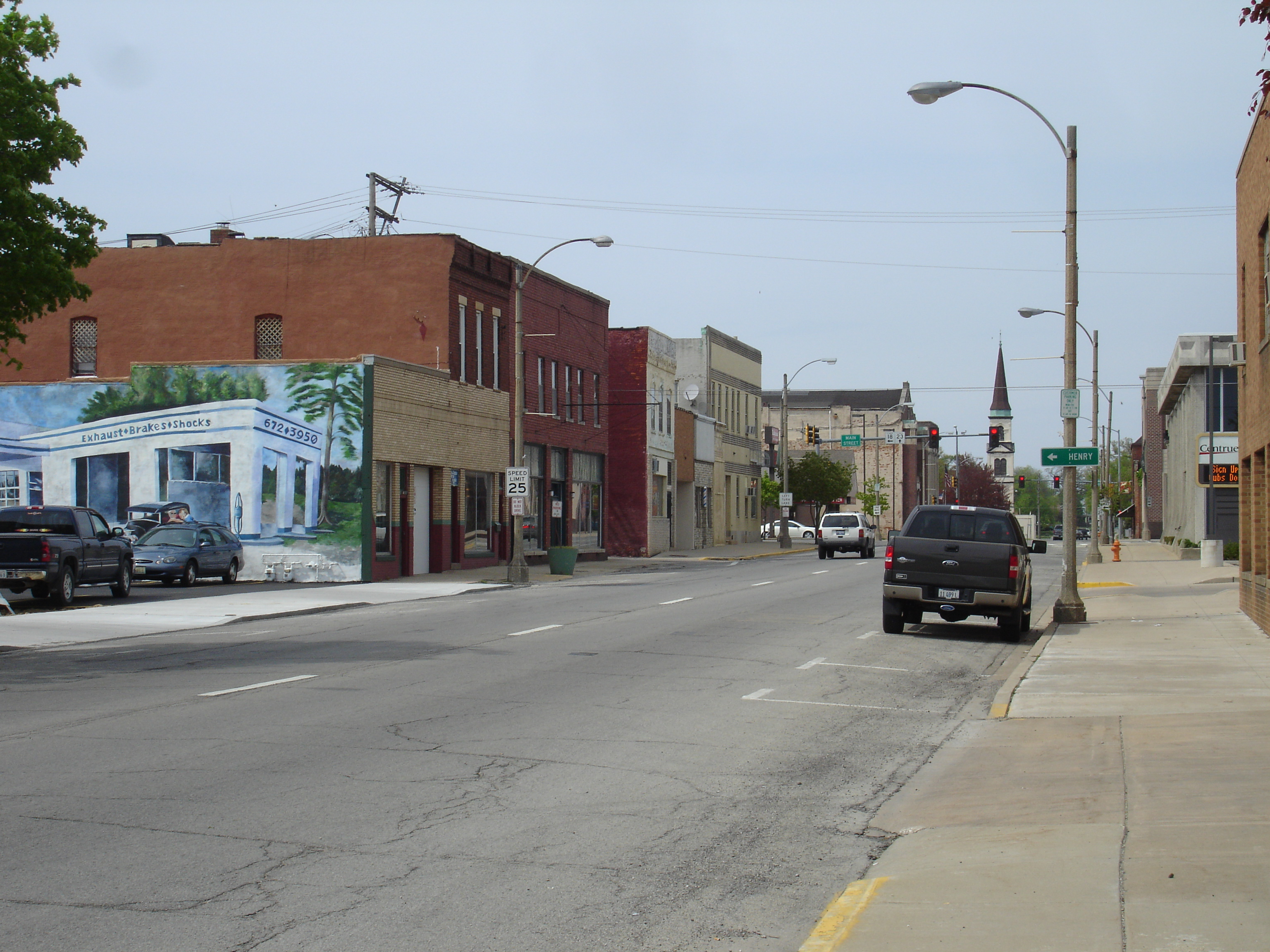
Streator, Illinois.

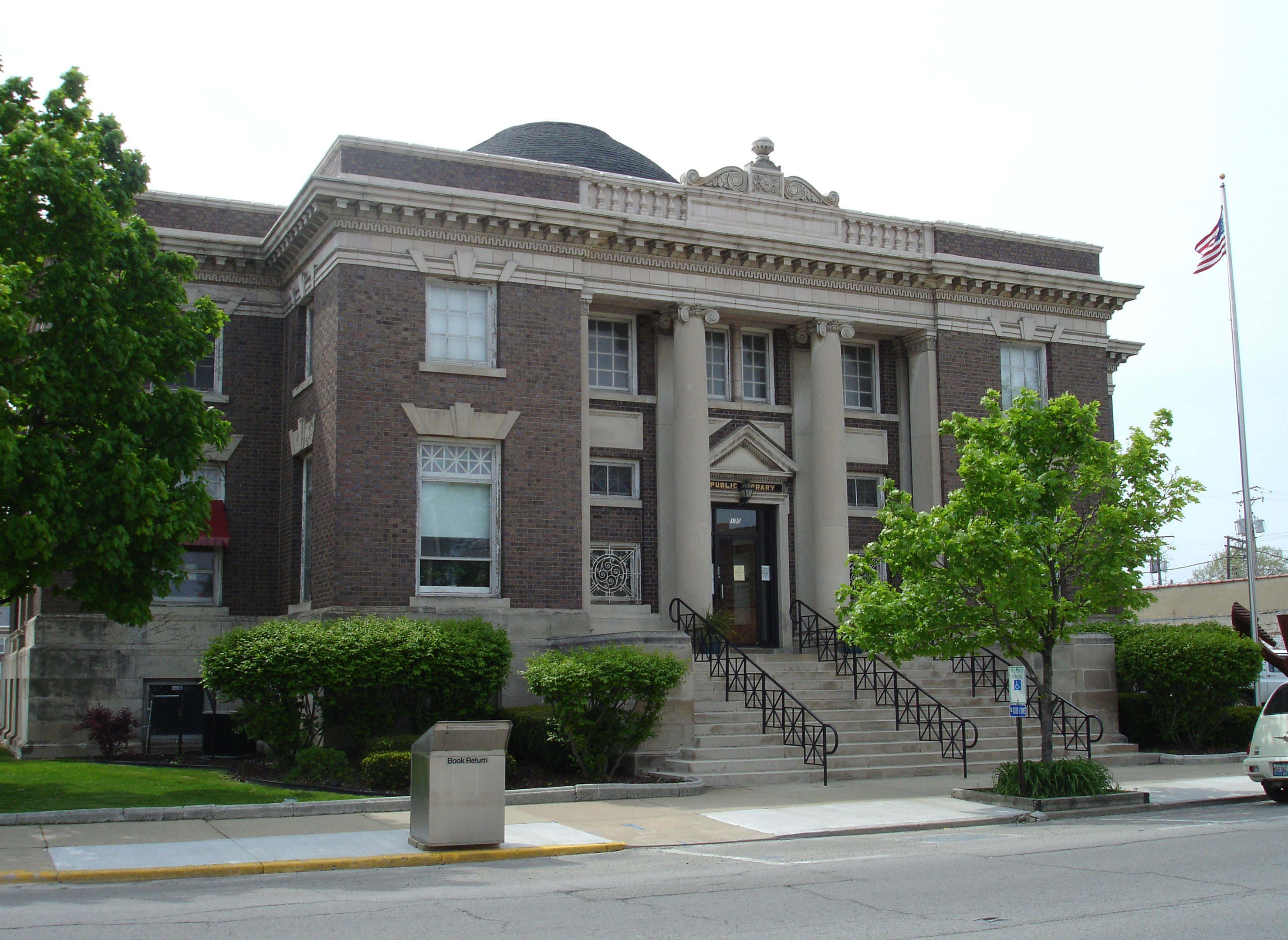
The Streator Public Library, a Carnegie library listed on the National Register of Historic Places.

In 1868 the newly developed town that was created in conjunction with the mines was incorporated as Streator, Illinois, named in honor of Streator. Colonel Ralph Plumb served as the new city's first mayor. Worthy Streator, himself, never visited the city named for him.

The success of the local mining operations and the introduction of the new glass making industry allowed for improvements in the living conditions and personal wealth of its miners and laborers. In his 1877 History of LaSalle County, author H.F. Kett states:

Perhaps no city...in Illinois, outside of the great city of Chicago, presents an instance of such rapid and substantial growth as the city of Streator. From a single small grocery house... the locality has grown to be a city of 6,000 prosperous and intelligent people. Churches, school-houses, large, substantial business houses and handsome residences, with elegant grounds and surroundings, now beautify the waste of ten years ago, while the hum of machinery and thronged streets are unmistakable evidences of business importance and prosperity.

Streator continued to flourish for much of the 20th century. Ultimately the demand for coal was replaced with the new demand for oil. Many of the mines closed in the 1920s, with the last of the mines finally shutting down in 1958. Since then, growth has stagnated, but Streator remains a viable manufacturing town with a glass bottle and a heavy equipment industry in addition to retail and agriculture.

== Political life ==
With the success of the Vermilion Coal Company in Streator, Illinois, Streator turned his attention back to his home in Cleveland and specifically toward politics. In 1869 he was elected to the Ohio State Senate representing Cuyahoga County's 25th senate district from 1870 to 1872. In 1872 he left the senate after one term and was named by then Ohio Governor (and later U.S. president) Rutherford B. Hayes as trustee of the Ohio Agricultural College. He served as a presidential elector for the Ohio 20th district in 1874 and voted for Hayes. In 1879, Hayes appointed Streator as Collector of Internal Revenue for the Northern District of Ohio. He was re-appointed by Presidents Garfield and Chester A. Arthur.

== Cleveland civic life ==
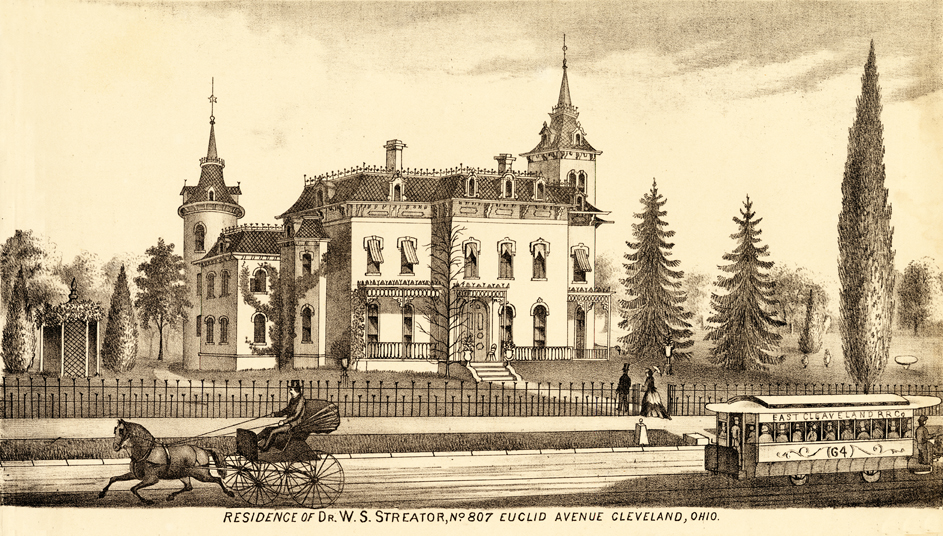
Worthy Streator's mansion was located on "Millionaires' Row.

Throughout his life Streator maintained close ties with the civic and business leaders in Cleveland and Ohio. He was involved with his church, the Disciples Church. He was a long-time resident of a grand mansion on 240 acres (0.97 km^{2}) on "Millionaires' Row" along Euclid Avenue in Cleveland. His neighbors included the first American billionaire, John D. Rockefeller. In 1865, Streator along with James A. Garfield and J.P. Robison organized the Christian Standard publishing company. Its periodical, Christian Standard became one of the leading independent religious magazines in the church. In 1887, Streator was instrumental in founding the Disciples Union of Cleveland.

After the death of Streator's friend, Leonard Case in 1880, Streator along with other Cleveland leaders enacted Case's plan to create a first-class research institute in Cleveland. The initial endowment by the group, led by the estate of Leonard Case created what was later to become the Case Western Reserve University.

By 1886, Streator returned to business, when he partnered with William Halsey Doan in creating the firm of W.H. Doan & Company. They began selling crude oil on commission, shipping it from the oil fields of northwestern Pennsylvania to Cleveland.

== James A. Garfield ==
Streator had a long association with President James A. Garfield. Streator offered Garfield a partnership in the Vermilion Coal Company in 1866. Garfield partnered with Streator in creating the Christian Standard publishing company. Garfield appointed Streator to political positions. Garfield represented Ohio in the U.S. House of Representatives from 1863 until his election as president in 1881. Garfield was in office for only four months, when he was shot and fatally wounded on July 2, 1881. Garfield died from complications of his wounds on September 19, 1881. The funeral held on September 26, 1881, was a majestic, solemn affair. An estimated one hundred thousand visitors came to Cleveland for the service and two-hundred and fifty thousand people lined the streets to view the five-mile procession which concluded at Cleveland's Lake View Cemetery. Streator was one of twelve friends and colleagues who took their place alongside Garfield's funeral car to serve as pall-bearers.

A year after Garfield's death, Streator became a principal member of an association created to build the Garfield Monument, in honor of their friend. Construction of the 180-foot (55 m) graystone mausoleum began in 1885. It contained a chapel in its center which hold the crypt of President Garfield and his wife, Lucretia. The monument was dedicated by Presidents Rutherford B. Hayes and Benjamin Harrison on May 29, 1890.

== Death and legacy ==
Streator died at age 85 on March 3, 1902, in Cleveland, Ohio. He was buried at Lake View Cemetery.

Streator is known primarily for the city of Streator, Illinois. In Cleveland, there was a street named Streator Avenue for many years, and currently there is a Streator Court. Streator Park, in Lorain, Ohio, houses the headquarters of the city's Parks and Recreation Department on land donated by Streator's estate. It is located at the corner of Long & Streator Streets. The Parks Department building was, until 1957, the Lorain Public Library.
