= Otter Creek Township, LaSalle County, Illinois =

Coordinates: 41°09′16″N 88°45′41″W

Otter Creek Township
- Township
- Location in LaSalle County

- LaSalle County's location in Illinois
- Country: United States
- State: Illinois
- County: LaSalle
- Established: Unknown

Area
  - Total: 35.84 sq mi (92.8 km^{2})
  - Land: 35.81 sq mi (92.7 km^{2})
  - Water: 0.03 sq mi (0.078 km^{2}) 0.08%

Population (2020)
  - Total: 2,643
  - Density: 73.81/sq mi (28.50/km^{2})
- Time zone: UTC-6 (CST)
  - Summer (DST): UTC-5 (CDT)
- FIPS code: 17-099-56965

Otter Creek Township is located in LaSalle County, Illinois. As of the 2020 census, its population was 2,643 and it contained 1,160 housing units. Otter Creek was formed from a portion of Bruce Township on an unknown date.

== Geography ==
According to the 2021 census gazetteer files, Otter Creek Township has a total area of 35.84 square miles (92.83 km^{2}), of which 35.81 square miles (92.75 km^{2}) (or 99.92%) is land and 0.03 square miles (0.08 km^{2}) (or 0.08%) is water.

== Demographics ==
As of the 2020 census there were 2,643 people, 1,109 households, and 778 families residing in the township. The population density was 73.74 inhabitants per square mile (28.47/km^{2}). There were 1,160 housing units at an average density of 32.37 per square mile (12.50/km^{2}). The racial makeup of the township was 88.88% White, 2.35% African American, 0.15% Native American, 0.19% Asian, 0.00% Pacific Islander, 1.82% from other races, and 6.62% from two or more races. Hispanic or Latino of any race were 5.94% of the population.

There were 1,109 households, out of which 36.90% had children under the age of 18 living with them, 51.22% were married couples living together, 10.01% had a female householder with no spouse present, and 29.85% were non-families. 26.10% of all households were made up of individuals, and 12.80% had someone living alone who was 65 years of age or older. The average household size was 2.44 and the average family size was 2.82.

The township's age distribution consisted of 23.0% under the age of 18, 4.9% from 18 to 24, 24.7% from 25 to 44, 28.9% from 45 to 64, and 18.5% who were 65 years of age or older. The median age was 43.1 years. For every 100 females, there were 98.9 males. For every 100 females age 18 and over, there were 88.4 males.

The median income for a household in the township was $53,429, and the median income for a family was $72,321. Males had a median income of $65,795 versus $31,951 for females. The per capita income for the township was $29,788. About 22.2% of families and 24.9% of the population were below the poverty line, including 34.2% of those under age 18 and 9.8% of those age 65 or over.

Historical population
Census	Pop.	Note	%±
2010	2,970		—
2020	2,643		−11.0%
U.S. Decennial Census

== Notable people ==
- Eliza M. Chandler White (1831–1907), charity work leader, abolitionist, and clubwoman
