= John L. Keeley Sr. =

American surgeon

John L. Keeley Sr. (April 12, 1904 – November 25, 1992) was an American surgeon who was the chairman of the department of surgery at Loyola University Chicago’s Stritch School of Medicine from 1958 until 1969. He was the personal physician for several Roman Catholic cardinals in Chicago, including Cardinals Samuel Stritch and Albert Gregory Meyer.

== Early life and education ==
Born John Lemuel Keeley in Streator, Illinois, Keeley earned a bachelor's degree in 1927 from Loyola University Chicago and a doctoral degree in 1929. He then interned at Mercy Hospital and Medical Center in Chicago. Keeley had surgical training at the University of Wisconsin from 1931 until 1933, at Wisconsin General Hospital from 1933 until 1936 and then in Boston from 1936 until 1938, including at Harvard Medical School and as an acting resident at Peter Bent Brigham Hospital from 1937 until 1938.

== Professional career ==
Keeley spent his first three years of his career in New Orleans, where he taught at Louisiana State University and was a visiting surgeon at Charity Hospital from 1938 until 1941.

In 1941, Keeley joined the faculty of the Loyola University Stritch School of Medicine as an assistant clinical professor. He was promoted to be an associate clinical professor in 1943. He was promoted to be a full professor of surgery at the Stritch School of Medicine in 1954.

In April 1958, Keeley attended to the ailing Cardinal Samuel Stritch in Rome not long before the cardinal died. The cardinal, who had been battling a blood clot and had to have his arm amputated, honored Keeley in May 1958 by conferring upon him the pontifical order, the Knight of St. Gregory.

From 1954 until 1958, Keeley was assistant chairman of the department of surgery at Stritch. From 1958 until 1969, Keeley was chairman of the department of surgery at Stritch. He also was appointed in 1969 to be head of surgery at Chicago’s Mercy Hospital, where he pioneered the development of cardiovascular surgery.

In 1965, Keeley tended to Cardinal Albert Gregory Meyer in Chicago after the 61-year-old prelate was hospitalized with an apparent gall bladder disorder. Keeley cared for Meyer when he underwent brain surgery and afterward, until Meyer's death on April 9, 1965.

In 1966, Archbishop of Chicago John Cody, then the head of Chicago’s Roman Catholic archdiocese, named Keeley to be one of the members of a new commission on human relations and ecumenism.

In 1976, Keeley received the Stritch Medal from Loyola University, which is presented annually to a physician or medical researcher who exhibits “to a high degree professional competence, resourcefulness, loyalty, benevolence and dedication.”

Keeley specialized in thoracic and vascular pediatric surgery and the study of blood volumes.

== Personal life ==
Keeley married Mary Edith Schneider in 1937. She died in September 1988.

Keeley had three sons, including Chicago investment manager and philanthropist John L. Keeley Jr., and 10 grandchildren.

Keeley had been a resident of North Riverside, Illinois. He died on November 25, 1992, in Westchester, Illinois.
