= Bruce Township, LaSalle County, Illinois =

Coordinates: 41°09′58″N 88°50′44″W

Bruce Township
- Township
- Location in LaSalle County

- LaSalle County's location in Illinois
- Country: United States
- State: Illinois
- County: LaSalle
- Established: November 6, 1849

Area
  - Total: 17.00 sq mi (44.0 km^{2})
  - Land: 16.99 sq mi (44.0 km^{2})
  - Water: 0.01 sq mi (0.026 km^{2}) 0.06%

Population (2020)
  - Total: 11,800
  - Estimate: 12,604
- Time zone: UTC-6 (CST)
  - Summer (DST): UTC-5 (CDT)
- ZIP code: 61364
- Area codes: 815 and 779
- FIPS code: 17-099-09057
- Website: brucetownshipil.org

Bruce Township is located in LaSalle County, Illinois. As of the 2020 census, its population was 11,800 and it contained 5,769 housing units. Most of Streator is located in the township.

== Geography ==
According to the 2021 census gazetteer files, Bruce Township has a total area of 17.00 square miles (44.03 km^{2}), of which 16.99 square miles (44.00 km^{2}) (or 99.94%) is land and 0.01 square miles (0.03 km^{2}) (or 0.06%) is water. The township's western border is formed by the Vermilion River.

== Demographics ==
As of the 2020 census there were 11,800 people, 5,750 households, and 3,053 families residing in the township. The population density was 694.32 inhabitants per square mile (268.08/km^{2}). There were 5,769 housing units at an average density of 339.45 per square mile (131.06/km^{2}). The racial makeup of the township was 81.44% White, 3.27% African American, 0.57% Native American, 0.68% Asian, 0.00% Pacific Islander, 5.91% from other races, and 8.14% from two or more races. Hispanic or Latino of any race were 13.36% of the population.

There were 5,750 households, out of which 26.70% had children under the age of 18 living with them, 35.13% were married couples living together, 14.09% had a female householder with no spouse present, and 46.90% were non-families. 42.10% of all households were made up of individuals, and 17.10% had someone living alone who was 65 years of age or older. The average household size was 2.14 and the average family size was 2.91.

The township's age distribution consisted of 21.2% under the age of 18, 9.4% from 18 to 24, 27.7% from 25 to 44, 23.3% from 45 to 64, and 18.4% who were 65 years of age or older. The median age was 39.4 years. For every 100 females, there were 95.8 males. For every 100 females age 18 and over, there were 93.8 males.

The median income for a household in the township was $42,230, and the median income for a family was $63,164. Males had a median income of $45,997 versus $23,144 for females. The per capita income for the township was $25,691. About 17.9% of families and 21.0% of the population were below the poverty line, including 37.5% of those under age 18 and 5.1% of those age 65 or over.

Historical population
| Census | Pop. | Note | %± |
|---|---|---|---|
| 2010 | 13,185 | | — |
| 2020 | 11,800 | | −10.5% |
U.S. Decennial Census
