= Allen T. Brinsmade =

American politician

Member of the Ohio Senate from the 25th district
- In office January 1, 1872 – January 4, 1874 Serving with Benjamin R. Beavis
- Preceded by: Worthy S. Streator
- Succeeded by: William Bingham; H. W. Curtiss

Personal details
- Born: March 29, 1837 Claridon, Geauga County, Ohio
- Died: November 16, 1913 (aged 76) Cuyahoga County, Ohio
- Resting place: Lake View Cemetery, Cleveland
- Party: Republican
- Education: Western Reserve College

Military service
- Allegiance: United States
- Branch/service: 150th Ohio Infantry
- Years of service: 1864
- Battles/wars: American Civil War

Allen T. Brinsmade (March 29, 1837 – November 16, 1913) was a Republican politician from Cleveland, Ohio, United States who was President of the Ohio State Senate 1872–73, and was later United States Attorney for the Northern District of Ohio.

== Early life ==
Allen T. Brinsmade was born at Claridon, Geauga County, Ohio, on March 29, 1837. When he was six years old, his family moved to Chagrin Falls, Ohio, where he grew up.

== Education ==
He graduated from Western Reserve College in 1860 and Cleveland Law College in 1861, being admitted to the bar that year in Cleveland.

== Career ==
Brinsmade was assistant city attorney of Cleveland 1863 to 1866. He enlisted for 100 days in the 150th Ohio Infantry in 1864, and was stationed in Washington, D.C. In 1866 he was elected city attorney of Cleveland, and was elected to the Ohio State Senate in 1871. He was president pro-tem that term.

Brinsmade returned to the law firm Brinsmade & Stone, and was appointed an aide on the staff of Ohio Governor Rutherford B. Hayes in 1876. In 1877, he was appointed a colonel in the Ohio National Guard. He was elected to Cleveland City Council in 1884, and in 1885 was elected to a four-year term as city solicitor, to which he was re-elected in 1889. He was chairman of the Republican state committee 1887–1888.

From December 23, 1890, to 1895, Brinsmade was United States Attorney for the Northern District of Ohio.

== Death ==
Brinsmade died November 16, 1913, and is interred at Lake View Cemetery.
