= Reading Township, Livingston County, Illinois =

Coordinates: 41°04′03″N 88°52′31″W

Reading Township
- Township
- Location in Livingston County

- Livingston County's location in Illinois
- Country: United States
- State: Illinois
- County: Livingston
- Established: November 3, 1857

Area
  - Total: 37.79 sq mi (97.9 km^{2})
  - Land: 37.69 sq mi (97.6 km^{2})
  - Water: 0.11 sq mi (0.28 km^{2}) 0.28%

Population (2020)
  - Total: 2,023
  - Density: 53.67/sq mi (20.72/km^{2})
- Time zone: UTC-6 (CST)
  - Summer (DST): UTC-5 (CDT)
- FIPS code: 17-105-63017

Reading Township is located in Livingston County, Illinois. As of the 2020 census, its population was 2,023 and it contained 1,008 housing units.

== Geography ==
According to the 2021 census gazetteer files, Reading Township has a total area of 37.79 square miles (97.88 km^{2}), of which 37.69 square miles (97.62 km^{2}) (or 99.72%) is land and 0.11 square miles (0.28 km^{2}) (or 0.28%) is water.

== Demographics ==
As of the 2020 census there were 2,023 people, 915 households, and 533 families residing in the township. The population density was 53.53 inhabitants per square mile (20.67/km^{2}). There were 1,008 housing units at an average density of 26.67 per square mile (10.30/km^{2}). The racial makeup of the township was 91.55% White, 0.89% African American, 0.15% Native American, 0.54% Asian, 0.00% Pacific Islander, 0.94% from other races, and 5.93% from two or more races. Hispanic or Latino of any race were 4.45% of the population.

There were 915 households, out of which 18.50% had children under the age of 18 living with them, 41.53% were married couples living together, 2.73% had a female householder with no spouse present, and 41.75% were non-families. 35.70% of all households were made up of individuals, and 18.30% had someone living alone who was 65 years of age or older. The average household size was 2.07 and the average family size was 2.61.

According to the 2020 American Community Survey, township's age distribution consisted of 13.0% under the age of 18, 5.1% from 18 to 24, 19% from 25 to 44, 31.5% from 45 to 64, and 31.3% who were 65 years of age or older. The median age was 54.4 years. For every 100 females, there were 101.3 males. For every 100 females age 18 and over, there were 97.8 males.

The median income for a household in the township was $50,879, and the median income for a family was $64,219. Males had a median income of $51,473 versus $24,459 for females. The per capita income for the township was $28,871. About 11.3% of families and 13.3% of the population were below the poverty line, including 15.9% of those under age 18 and 9.3% of those age 65 or over.

Historical population
Census	Pop.	Note	%±
2000	2,247		—
2010	2,046		−8.9%
2020	2,023		−1.1%
U.S. Decennial Census
