= Streator Public Library =

- U.S. National Register of Historic Places
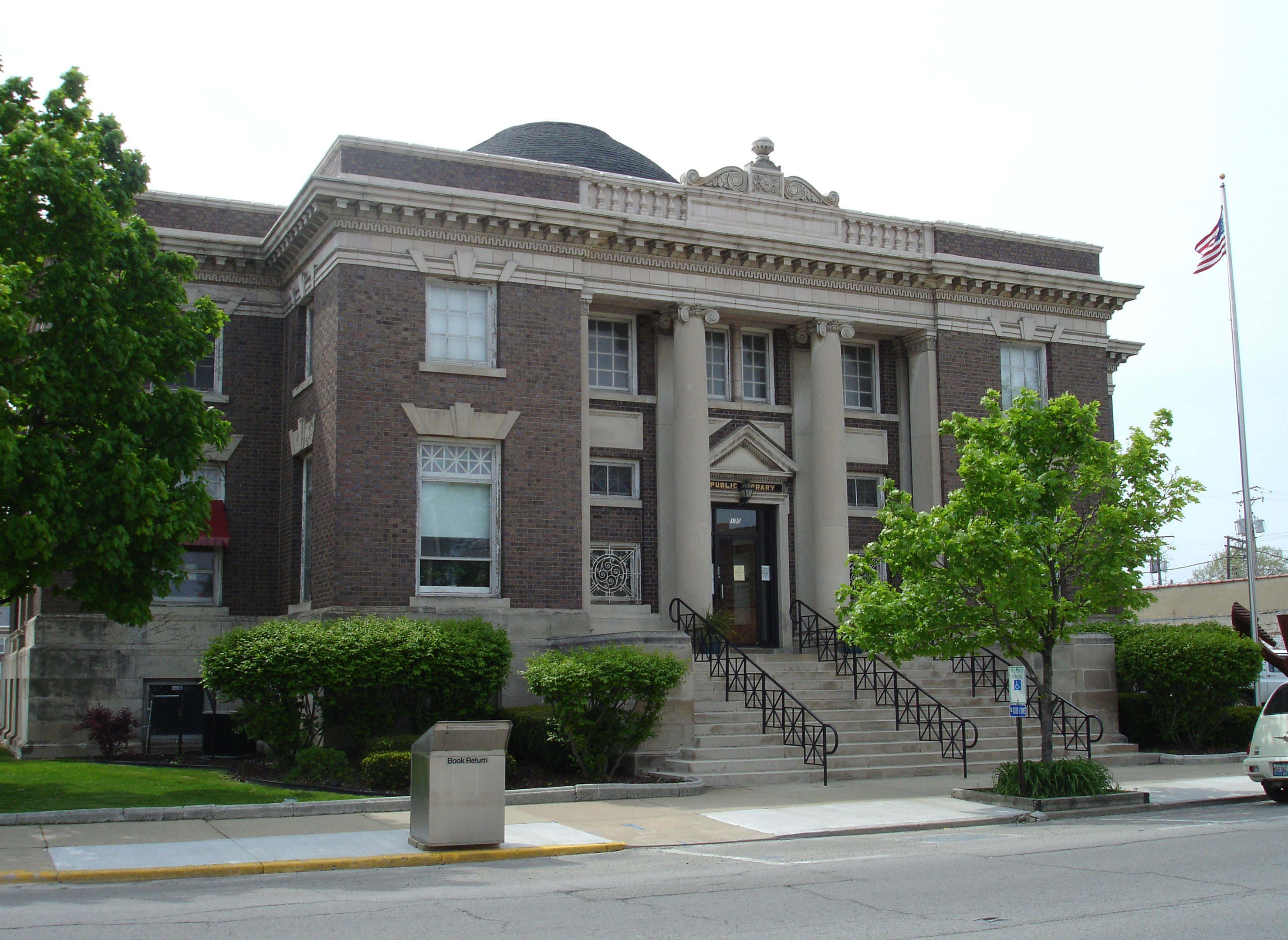

- Location within Illinois Location within the United States
- Location: 130 S. Park St., Streator, Illinois
- Coordinates: 41°7′10″N 88°50′4″W
- Area: less than one acre
- Built: 1903
- Architect: Patton & Miller
- Architectural style: Classical Revival
- MPS: Illinois Carnegie Libraries MPS
- NRHP reference No.: 96000512
- Added to NRHP: May 2, 1996

The Streator Public Library is a historic Carnegie library located at 130 S. Park Street in Streator, Illinois. Opened in 1903, the library was the first permanent home for Streator's library association. Architects Patton & Miller designed the Classical Revival building. The library is listed on the National Register of Historic Places and is still home to Streator's main public library.

== History ==
Streator's first library association, the Streator Library Association, lasted from 1871 to 1875 and was based out of various local businesses. After the association failed, the Ladies Library Association formed in 1876; it occupied space in multiple community buildings before eventually settling in the Plumb Opera House. Ralph Plumb, owner of the opera house, was a personal friend of Andrew Carnegie; when Carnegie began his library program, Plumb reached out to him to ask for a grant for Streator's library. Carnegie gave the community $35,000 for its library; the sum was one of the largest granted through the library program. Work on the building began in 1902, and it opened on January 31, 1903.

The library was added to the National Register of Historic Places on May 2, 1996.

== Architecture ==
Chicago architects Patton & Miller designed the library in the Classical Revival style. Two-story columns flank the front entrance, which is topped by a pediment. A terra cotta cornice and frieze encircle the building; the cornice includes modillions and a fretwork pattern, while the frieze consists of flat panels. A brick parapet with an elaborate terra cotta panel at the front rises above the roof line, and a dome tops the roof. The interior of the building includes a two-story rotunda; the first floor of the rotunda is surrounded by columns, while the second floor features murals of William Shakespeare, Henry Wadsworth Longfellow, and Socrates.
