= Walter Mickle Smith =

American civil engineer (1867–1953)

Walter Mickle Smith, Sr. (October 26, 1867 - March 12, 1953) was a civil engineer who worked primarily on U.S. dams and waterway projects. He was a consulting engineer on the construction of the Panama Canal and Panama Canal Locks and later served as design engineer for the New York Board of Water Supply. He spent much of his career with the State of Illinois waterways division and was its chief engineer until his retirement in 1937. Several of his works built in the 1920s and 1930s as part of the Illinois Waterway project are listed on the National Register of Historic Places, including portions of the Brandon Road Lock and Dam, the Dresden Island Lock and Dam, the Lockport Lock and Power House, and the Marseilles Lock and Dam.

== Early life and initial career ==
Smith was born October 26, 1867, in Newberry, South Carolina. He received bachelor of science and civil engineering degrees from the Military College of South Carolina. He started his engineering career in 1890 in Chattanooga, Tennessee, working on railroad projects.

== U.S. government engineering ==
In 1891 he joined the U.S. Army Corps of Engineers, working from 1891 to 1897 on coastal fortifications and jetty construction in Charleston, South Carolina. In 1897 he was moved to Portland, Maine, where he worked on design of buildings, roads, wharves, fortifications and coastal structures until being transferred back to Charleston in 1903 to assume authority over the design and construction of fortifications in the Charleston district. He was elevated from associate member to full member of the American Society of Civil Engineers in 1906.

In 1905, the Army Corps of Engineers assigned Smith to Washington, D.C., working on engineering plans for the Panama Canal. Also in 1905, he supervised design and construction of a $150,000 project at a powder depot in Dover, New Jersey, returning to Washington, DC, in 1906 to continue work as a consulting engineer on the Canal and the Panama Canal Locks.

== New York and Ohio ==
He left the Army Corps in 1907 to become the division engineer and later the design engineer for the New York Board of Water Supply, where his responsibilities included design and construction projects for the Catskill water system. In 1910, the Albany Society of Civil Engineers published his work, "The Design of Masonry Dams."

In 1914 he left the New York Board of Water Supply to form a general hydraulic and construction engineering firm with Mortimer Grant Barnes, with whom he had worked on the Panama Canal and at the New York water supply board. The two designed a hydroelectric plant at Waterloo, New York. Also in 1914, Smith and his son Walter M. Smith, Jr., published the article "Concrete Bridges: Some Important Features in Their Design." That same year, Smith next went to work for the Miami Conservancy District in Dayton, Ohio, where he was in charge of the design of flood protection work in the Miami Valley until 1919.

== Illinois Waterway ==
In 1919, Smith was hired by his long-time colleague Mortimer Grant Barnes as chief design engineer for the Illinois Waterway Project, a system that includes eight locks providing a shipping connection from the Great Lakes to the Gulf of Mexico via the Mississippi River. Smith was placed "in charge of design and preparation of plans for locks, dams and structures" pertaining to the Illinois Waterway. In articles by Smith published in the Engineering Record in 1914 and 1915, Smith had described what he called the "least work" method for the design of arched structures. In its Second Annual Report in 1919, the Department of Waterways noted that its plans for locks were based on Smith's "least work" methodology:

The wall designs adopted for the Illinois Waterway have been checked by these methods, but the designs are based on the 'least work' method for the analysis of arched structures as described by articles by Walter M. Smith . . . It is believed that the 'least work' method, while more laborious, is the most accurate way of determining the stresses, and it results in more economical designs.

In 1929, Smith was promoted to chief of the design section and served as chief engineer of Illinois state waterways from 1934 to 1937. At least five of Smith's works in the State of Illinois are listed on the U.S. National Register of Historic Places ("NRHP"), including the following:

- Brandon Road Lock and Dam Historic District, 1100 Brandon Road, Joliet, Illinois. Smith is credited with designing the lock, dam and ice protection wall. The project was built from 1927 to 1933. The structures are now listed on the NRHP. (Smith, Walter Mickle), NRHP-listed
- Dresden Island Lock and Dam Historic District, 7521 N. Lock Road, Morris, Illinois. Smith is credited with designing the control station, lock, auxiliary lock, and dam. These structures are now listed on the NRHP.
- Lockport Lock, Dam and Power House Historic District, 2502 Channel Drive, Lockport, Illinois. The original lock and dam were built between 1905 and 1907. A second phase of construction occurred starting in 1922 as part of the development of the Illinois Waterway. During that second phase, Smith is credited with the design of the control station, and unspecified "engineers with the State of Illinois" designed the Ohio River Standard Navigation lock. Smith was the chief designing engineer of the Illinois Division of Waterways during the second phase. The structures are now listed on the NRHP.
- Marseilles Lock and Dam Historic District, 1 Hawk Drive, Marseilles, Illinois. Smith is credited with designing the lock and old control station, which were built from 1925 to 1933. The structures are listed on the NRHP. The State of Illinois (no specific person) is credited with the design of the canal, dam and dam boiler house.
- Starved Rock Lock and Dam Historic District, 950 N 27th Road, Ottawa, Illinois. Smith was the chief design engineer on the lock and dam, which were built from 1926 to 1933. The lock and dam are now listed on the NRHP.

In 1926, Smith and L.D. Cornish published "Engineering Features of the Illinois Waterway" reviewing the development of the waterway to that point. As of 1932, the Illinois Waterway was employing approximately 10,000 men, and Smith reported that the state's construction of 11 bridges across the waterway was estimated to cost $3.5 million. After retiring in 1937, Smith remained as a consulting engineer for the State of Illinois waterways division from 1937 to 1946. He was also the author of the Stream Flow Data of Illinois, a 1937 work of the Illinois Division of Waterways (which he headed) and the U.S. Geological Survey.

== Family and later life ==
In 1889, Smith married Nettie Babcock McDonald, a fellow South Carolina native born in September 1866. Their first child, Walter M. Smith, Jr., was born in 1890 in Tennessee. They had four additional children, Dorothy, Teresa, MacDonald and Patra Lee. After moving to Chicago, Smith and his wife lived in the Midway Park section of Chicago. Nettie died in January 1942.

In his later years, Smith returned to his home state, South Carolina. He died in 1953 at Spartanburg, South Carolina.
