= Naplate, Illinois =

Village in LaSalle County, Illinois, United States

- Village
- Location in LaSalle County, Illinois
- Coordinates: 41°19′58″N 88°52′37″W
- Country: United States
- State: Illinois
- County: LaSalle
- Township: Ottawa

Area
  - Total: 0.16 sq mi (0.41 km^{2})
  - Land: 0.16 sq mi (0.41 km^{2})
  - Water: 0 sq mi (0.00 km^{2})
- Elevation: 486 ft (148 m)

Population (2020)
  - Total: 412
  - Density: 2,582.3/sq mi (997.05/km^{2})
- Time zone: UTC-6 (CST)
  - Summer (DST): UTC-5 (CDT)
- ZIP Code(s): 61350
- Area code: 815
- FIPS code: 17-51648
- GNIS feature ID: 2399435
- Website: https://villageofnaplate.com/

Naplate is a village in LaSalle County, Illinois, United States. The population was 412 at the 2020 census. It is part of the Ottawa Micropolitan Statistical Area.

== History ==
The name Naplate was created at the time of incorporation by combining the name of the primary employer, National Plate Glass Company into Naplate.

== Geography ==
According to the 2021 census gazetteer files, Naplate has a total area of 0.16 square miles (0.41 km^{2}), all land.

Naplate lies on the north bank of the Illinois River just downstream from Ottawa. Buffalo Rock State Park and Starved Rock State Park lie along the river just west and southwest of Naplate.

== Demographics ==
Historical population
Census	Pop.	Note	%±
1950	783		—
1960	738		−5.7%
1970	686		−7.0%
1980	581		−15.3%
1990	609		4.8%
2000	523		−14.1%
2010	496		−5.2%
2020	412		−16.9%
U.S. Decennial Census

As of the 2020 census there were 412 people, 231 households, and 120 families residing in the village. The population density was 2,575.00 inhabitants per square mile (994.21/km^{2}). There were 241 housing units at an average density of 1,506.25 per square mile (581.57/km^{2}). The racial makeup of the village was 86.41% White, 1.70% African American, 1.46% Native American, 0.24% Asian, 1.70% from other races, and 8.50% from two or more races. Hispanic or Latino of any race were 7.52% of the population.

There were 231 households, out of which 20.8% had children under the age of 18 living with them, 28.57% were married couples living together, 15.15% had a female householder with no husband present, and 48.05% were non-families. 41.56% of all households were made up of individuals, and 20.35% had someone living alone who was 65 years of age or older. The average household size was 2.50 and the average family size was 1.91.

The village's age distribution consisted of 12.2% under the age of 18, 10.4% from 18 to 24, 19.7% from 25 to 44, 35.8% from 45 to 64, and 21.9% who were 65 years of age or older. The median age was 51.5 years. For every 100 females, there were 104.6 males. For every 100 females age 18 and over, there were 99.0 males.

The median income for a household in the village was $45,673, and the median income for a family was $63,333. Males had a median income of $35,000 versus $23,750 for females. The per capita income for the village was $28,150. About 1.7% of families and 10.0% of the population were below the poverty line, including 9.3% of those under age 18 and 13.4% of those age 65 or over.

== See also ==
- List of municipalities in Illinois
