= Illinois Waterway =

Canal system in Illinois

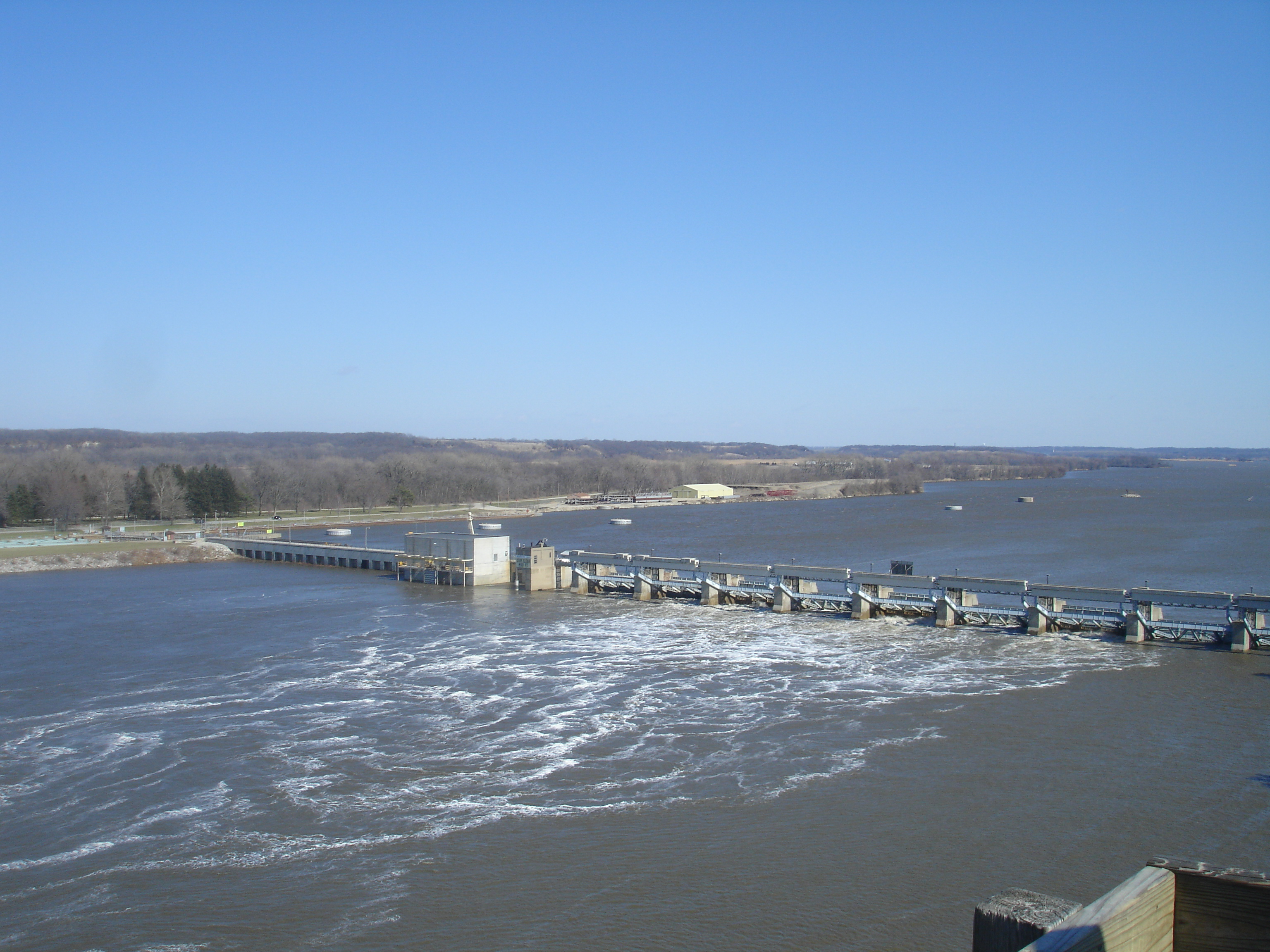
- The Illinois Waterway at Starved Rock Lock and Dam

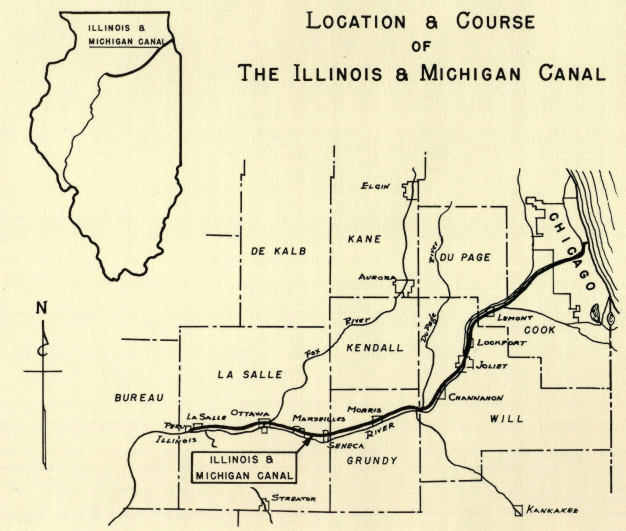
- Historical map of the I&M Canal. While later construction would create the Illinois Waterway, it generally follows a similar route as shown in the inset.
- Location: Northern / Central Illinois
- Country: United States

Specifications
- Length: 336 miles (541 km)
- Maximum boat draft: 9 feet (2.7 m)
- Locks: 8
- Total rise: 158 feet (48 m)
- Status: Open
- Navigation authority: U.S. Army Corps of Engineers

Geography
- Start point: Lake Michigan
- End point: Mississippi River
- Connects to: Great Lakes Waterway

The Illinois Waterway system consists of 336 miles (541 km) of navigable water from the mouth of the Calumet River at Chicago to the mouth of the Illinois River at Grafton, Illinois. Based primarily on the Illinois River, it is a system of rivers, lakes, and canals that provide a commercial shipping connection from the Great Lakes to the Gulf of Mexico via the Illinois and Mississippi rivers.

The Illinois and Michigan Canal (I&M) opened in 1848. In 1900, the Chicago Sanitary and Ship Canal replaced the I&M and reversed the flow of the Chicago River so it no longer flowed into Lake Michigan. The United States Army Corps of Engineers maintains a 9-foot-deep (2.7 m) navigation channel in the waterway. The waterway's complex northern section is referred to in various contexts for study and management as the Chicago Area Waterway System (CAWS).

Cargoes include bulk commodities, such as coal, chemicals, and petroleum, as well as corn, soybeans and other agricultural products. During some winters, ice floes, especially around the locks and dams, occasionally prevent navigation on the Waterway.

== Locks and dams ==
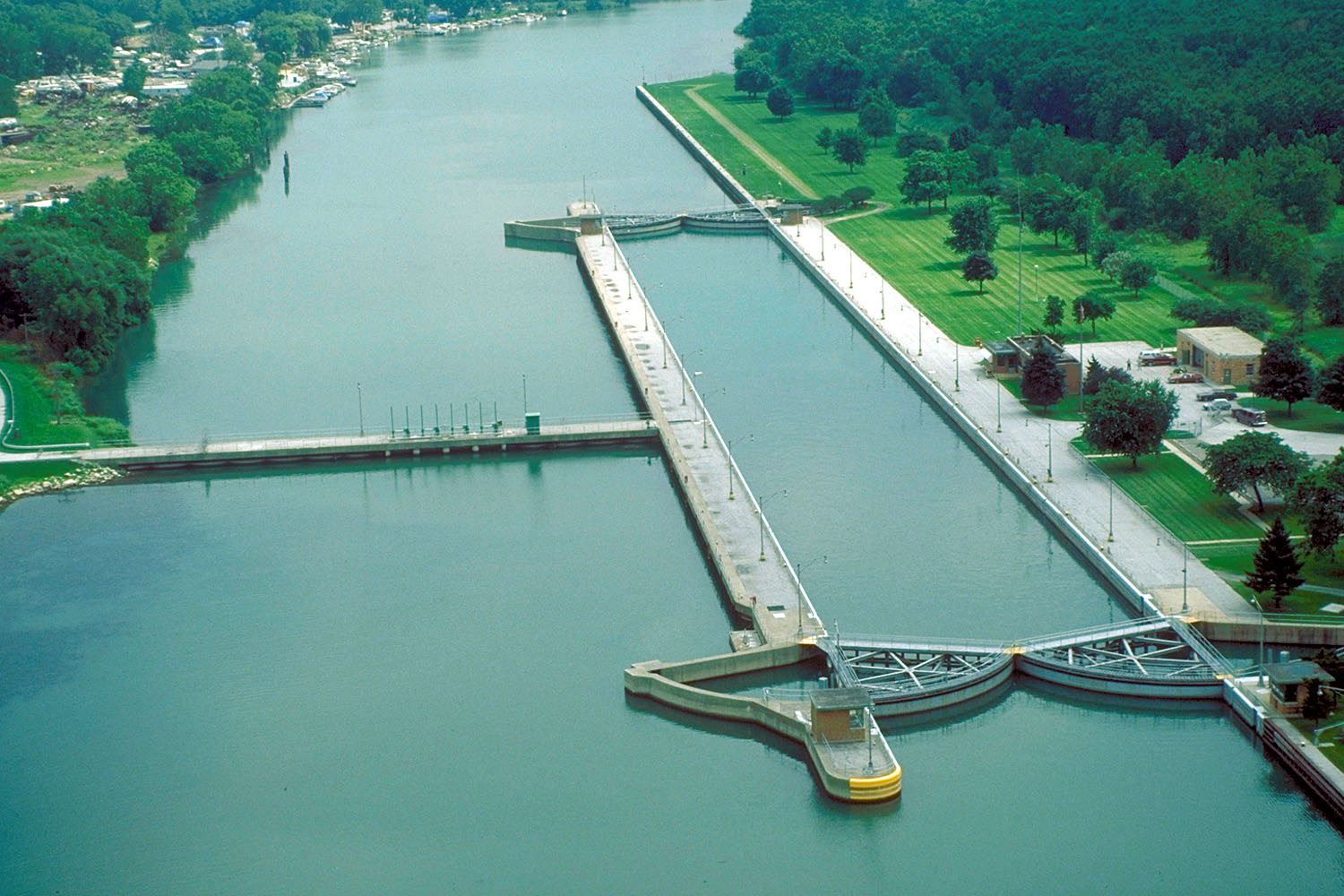
T. J. O’Brien Lock and Dam on the Calumet River, part of the Illinois Waterway

A series of eight locks, managed by the Army Corps of Engineers, controls water flow from Lake Michigan to the Mississippi River system. The upper lock, T.J. O'Brien, is 7 miles from Lake Michigan on the Calumet River and the last lock is 90 miles (140 km) upstream from the Mississippi River at the LaGrange lock and dam.

The amount of water released into the Illinois often is a sore point among lake and river interests. When Lake Michigan water levels are high, lake interests want to increase the flow, and when lake levels are low, they want to restrict the flow. That is why an international treaty regulates the flow, as Canada also has an interest in Lake Michigan levels, which eventually flow into Lakes Huron, Erie and Ontario.

Lock/Dam Name	Location	River Miles Above Mississippi	Pool Level (above sea level)	Vertical Drop	Geo Coordinates
T.J. O’Brien L&D	Chicago	326	579.5 feet (177 m)	1.5 feet (0.46 m)	41°39′7.45″N 87°34′1.24″W
Lockport L&D	Lockport	291	578 feet (176 m)	39 feet (12 m)	41°34′8.61″N 88°4′39.29″W
Brandon Road L&D	Joliet	286	539 feet (164 m)	34 feet (10 m)	41°30′12.12″N 88°6′11.04″W
Dresden Island L&D	Morris	271	505 feet (154 m)	21.75 feet (6.63 m)	41°23′52.66″N 88°16′56.42″W
Marseilles L&D	Marseilles	245	483 feet (147 m)	24.25 feet (7.39 m)	41°19′39.77″N 88°45′4.5″W
Starved Rock L&D	North Utica	231	458 feet (140 m)	18.7 feet (5.7 m)	41°19′27.93″N 88°59′10.82″W
Peoria L&D	Peoria	157	440 feet (134 m)	10 feet (3.0 m)	40°37′54.84″N 89°37′29.52″W
La Grange L&D	Beardstown	80	430 feet (131 m)	10 feet (3.0 m)	39°56′21.21″N 90°32′0.69″W

== Schematic ==
The schematic below illustrates the drop of the Illinois Waterway from 578 feet (176 m) (mean) above sea level at Lake Michigan to 419 feet (128 m) (mean) at the Mississippi River at Grafton, Illinois. The eight locks and dams (L&D) on the waterway provide the lift for traffic along the waterway.

Schematic of the Illinois Waterway from the Mississippi River to Lake Michigan
