= Starved Rock State Park =

State park in Illinois, United States

- IUCN category III (natural monument or feature)
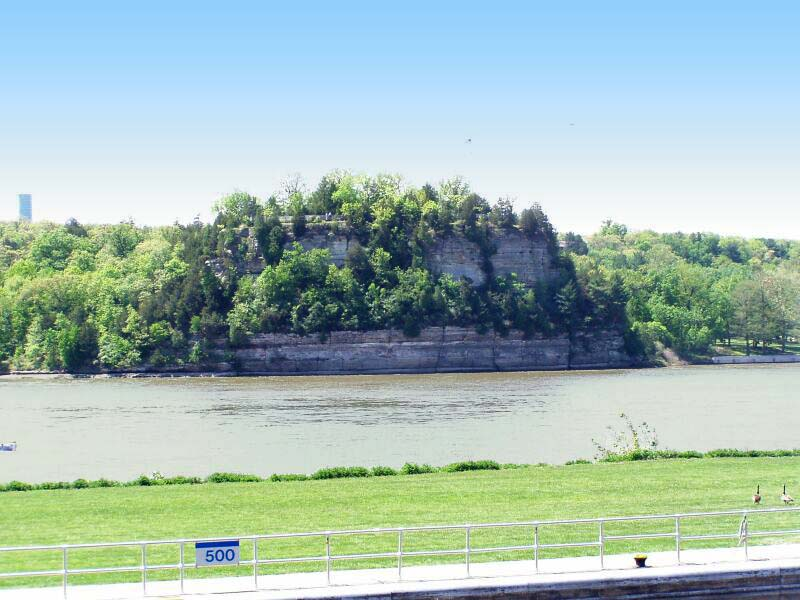
- Starved Rock, a National Historic Landmark, as viewed from the north side of the Illinois River, and the Illinois Waterway channel.

- Location within Illinois
- Location: Deer Park, LaSalle County, Illinois, United States
- Coordinates: 41°19′17″N 88°59′25″W
- Area: 2,630 acres (10.6 km^{2})
- Established: 1911; 115 years ago
- Named for: Starved Rock
- Visitors: 2.1 million
- Governing body: Illinois Department of Natural Resources
- Website: Starved Rock State Park

Starved Rock State Park is a state park in the U.S. state of Illinois, characterized by the many canyons within its 2,630 acres (1,064 ha). Located just southeast of the village of Utica, in Deer Park Township, LaSalle County, Illinois, along the south bank of the Illinois River, the park hosts over two million visitors annually, the most for any Illinois state park.

A flood from a melting glacier, known as the Kankakee Torrent, which took place approximately 14,000–19,000 years ago led to the topography of the site and its exposed rock canyons. Diverse forest plant life exists in the park and the area supports several wild animal species. Of particular interest has been sport fishing species.

Before European contact, the area was home to Native Americans, particularly the Kaskaskia who lived in the Grand Village of the Illinois across the river to the north. Louis Jolliet and Jacques Marquette were the first Europeans recorded as exploring the region, and by 1683, the French had established Fort St. Louis on the large sandstone butte overlooking the river, they called Le Rocher (the Rock). Later after the French had moved on, according to a local legend, a group of Native Americans of the Illinois Confederation (also called Illiniwek or Illini) pursued by the Ottawa and Potawatomi fled to the butte in the late 18th century. In the legend, around 1769 the Ottawa and Potawatomi besieged the butte until all of the Illiniwek had starved, and the butte became known as "Starved Rock".

In the late 19th century, parkland around 'Starved Rock' was developed as a vacation resort. The resort was acquired by the State of Illinois in 1911 for a state park, which it remains today. Facilities in the park were built by the Civilian Conservation Corps in the 1930s, which have also gained historic designation. The Rock was designated a National Historic Landmark in 1960. The park region has been the subject of several archeological studies concerning both native and European settlements, and various other archeological sites associated with the park were added to the National Register of Historic Places in 1998.

== Geology ==
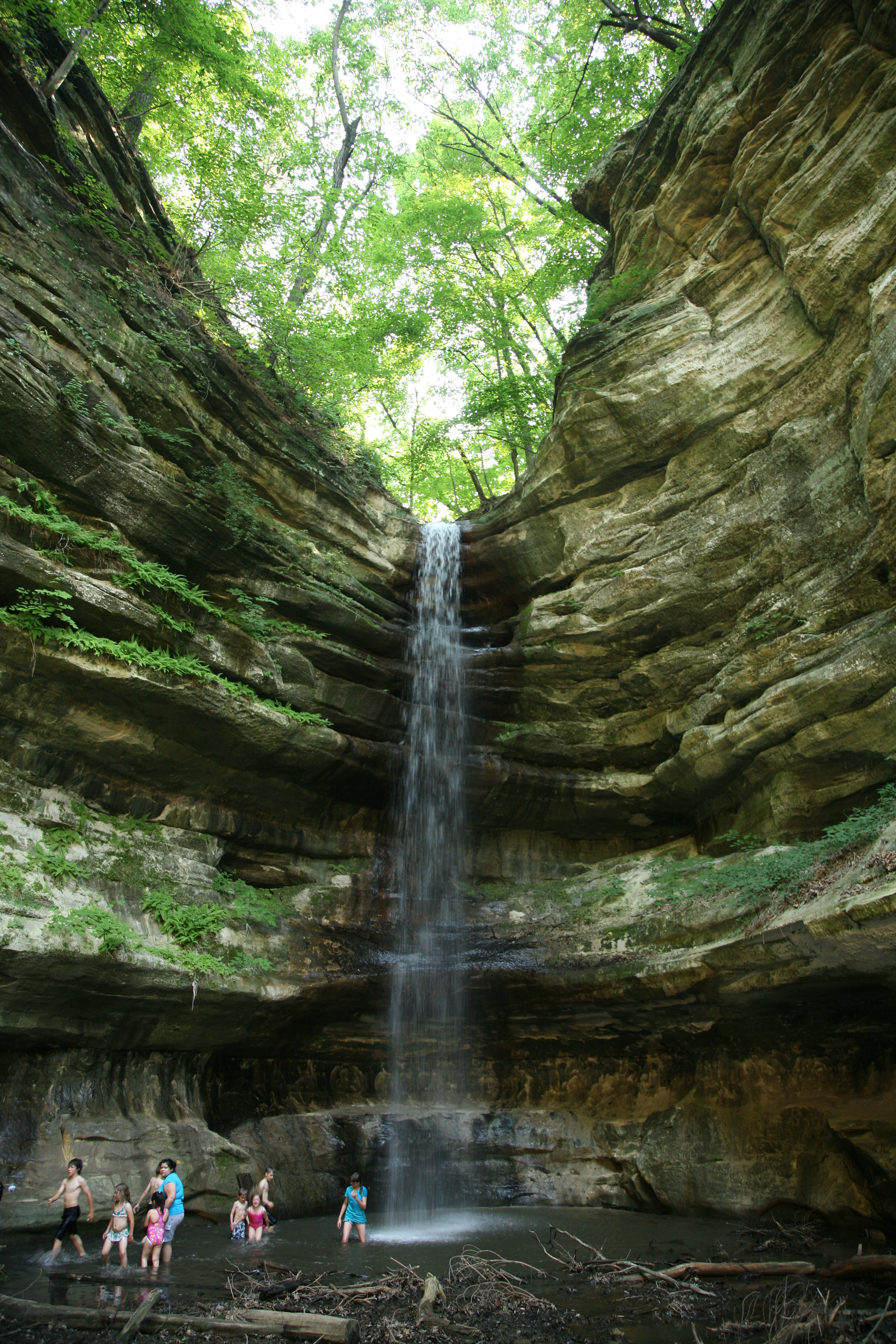
St. Louis Canyon waterfall

A catastrophic flood known as the Kankakee Torrent, which took place somewhere between 14,000 and 17,000 years ago, before humans occupied the area, helped create the park's signature geology and features, which are very unusual for the central plains.

The park is on the south bank of the Illinois River, a major tributary of the Mississippi River, between the Fox and Vermilion Rivers. The Vermilion created large sandbars at the junction of the Illinois, preventing practical navigation farther upriver. Rapids were found at the base of the butte before the construction of the Starved Rock Lock and Dam.

Starved Rock is known for its outcrops of St. Peter Sandstone. The sandstone, typically buried, is exposed in this area due to an anticline, a convex fold in underlying strata. This creates canyons and cliffs when streams cut across the anticline. The sandstone is pure and poorly cemented, making it workable with a pick or shovel. A similar geologic feature is found by near the Rock River between Dixon and Oregon, Illinois within Castle Rock State Park.

== History ==
=== Early settlements ===
Clovis points unearthed in the park indicate occupation by people of the Clovis Culture, which was widespread by about 11,000 BC. Clovis hunters specialized in hunting the large Pleistocene mammals, but a variety of other plants and animals were also exploited. Archeological surveys have located Archaic period (8000 – 2000 BC) settlements along the Illinois River. These prehistoric indigenous peoples thrived by foraging and hunting a variety of wild foods; Havana Hopewell settlers during the Woodland period (1000 BC – 1000 AD) built earthwork mounds. They also made pottery and domesticated plants.

The growth of agriculture and maize surpluses supported the development of the complex Mississippian culture. Its peoples established permanent settlements in the Mississippi, Illinois, and Ohio river valleys. They harvested maize, beans, and pumpkins, and were noted for their copper ornaments. The first interaction with other tribes occurred during this period: artifacts from the major regional chiefdom and urban complex of Cahokia, at present-day Collinsville, Illinois, have been recovered at Illinois River sites.

The earliest group of inhabitants recorded by the colonial French in the region were the historical Kaskaskia, whose large settlement on the north side of the Illinois River was known as the Grand Village of the Illinois. The Kaskaskia were members of the Illinois Confederation, who inhabited the region in the 16th through the 18th centuries. They lived in wigwams made of lightweight material. The natives could easily dismantle these structures when they traveled to hunt bison twice a year. The women gathered tubers from nearby swamps as a secondary source of food. Small bands of aggressive Haudenosaunee settlers arrived in northern Illinois in 1660 in search of new hunting grounds for beaver, stimulating intertribal warfare. The Kaskaskia struggled with the Haudenosaunee, who were armed with guns seized from or traded by Europeans in the eastern United States.

=== French exploration and mission ===
In 1673 Louis Jolliet and Father Jacques Marquette were the first known Europeans to explore the northern portion of the Mississippi River. On their return, they navigated the Illinois River, which they found to be a convenient route to Lake Michigan. Along the river, they found seventy-three cabins in the Grand Village, whose population rapidly expanded in the next several years. Marquette returned to the village in 1675 to set up the Mission of the Immaculate Conception, the first Christian mission in modern-day Illinois. Marquette was joined by fellow Jesuit priest Claude-Jean Allouez in 1677. By 1680, the Grand Village was home to several hundred native cabins and a large population.

In 1680 the Haudenosaunee temporarily drove the Kaskaskia out of the settlement during the Beaver Wars, as they were trying to expand their hunting territory. With an increase in French settlers in the area, the Kaskaskia returned by 1683. The French were able to provide the Kaskaskia with guns in exchange for other goods, which they used for defense against the powerful Haudenosaunee, already armed by the English.

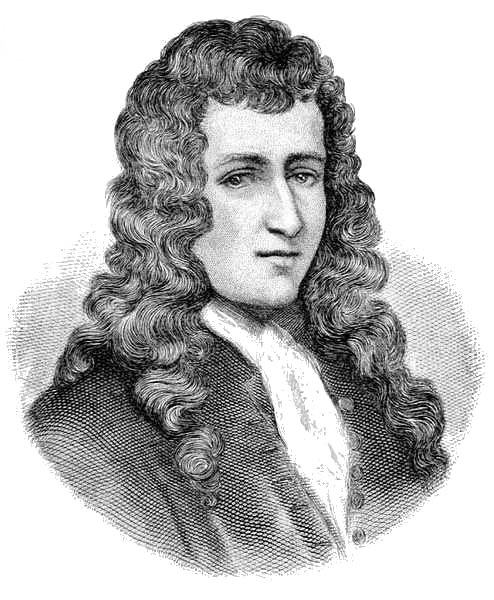
Portrait of René-Robert Cavelier, Sieur de La Salle, who built the first French settlement in northern Illinois

=== Fort St. Louis du Rocher ===
French explorers led by René-Robert Cavelier, Sieur de La Salle and Henry de Tonty built Fort St. Louis on the large butte by the river in the winter of 1682. Called Le Rocher, the butte provided an advantageous position for the fort above the Illinois River. A wooden palisade was the only form of defense that La Salle used in securing the site. Inside the fort were a few wooden houses and native shelters. The French intended St. Louis to be the first of several forts to defend against English incursions and keep their settlements confined to the East Coast. Accompanying the French to the region were allied members of several native tribes from eastern areas, who integrated with the Kaskaskia: the Miami, Shawnee, and Mahican. The tribes established a new settlement at the base of the butte at a site now known as Hotel Plaza. After La Salle's five year monopoly ended, Governor Joseph-Antoine de La Barre wished to obtain Fort St. Louis along with Fort Frontenac for himself. By orders of the governor, traders and his officers were escorted to Illinois. On August 11, 1683, Prudhomme obtained approximately one and three quarters of a mile of the north portage shore.

During the French and Indian Wars, the French used the fort as a refuge against attacks by the Haudenosaunee, who were allied with the British. The Haudenosaunee forced the settlers, then commanded by Henri de Tonty, to abandon the fort in 1691. De Tonty reorganized the settlers and constructed Fort Pimiteoui in modern-day Peoria.

French troops commanded by Pierre Deliette may have occupied Fort St. Louis from 1714 to 1718; Deliette's jurisdiction over the region ended when the territory was transferred from Canada to Louisiana. Fur trappers and traders used the fort periodically in the early 18th century until it became too dilapidated. No surface remains of the fort are found at the site today.

=== "Starved Rock" ===
The region was periodically occupied by a variety of native tribes who were forced westward by the expansion of European settlements and the Beaver Wars. These included the Potawatomi and others.

There are various local legends about how Starved Rock got its name. The most popular is a tale of revenge for the assassination of Ottawa leader Pontiac, who was killed in Cahokia on April 20, 1769, by an Illinois Confederation warrior. According to the legend, the Ottawa, along with their allies the Potawatomi, avenged Pontiac's death by attacking a band of Illiniwek along the Illinois River. The Illiniwek climbed to the butte to seek refuge, but their pursuers besieged the rock until the tribe starved to death, thereby giving the place the name "Starved Rock". The legend sometimes maintains, falsely, that this resulted in the complete extermination of the Illiniwek. Apart from oral history, there is no historical evidence that the siege happened. An early written report of the legend was related by Henry Schoolcraft in 1825.

In 1919 Edgar Lee Masters, author of Spoon River Anthology, wrote a poem titled "Starved Rock" in which he voiced a dramatic elegy for the Illini tribe whose tragic death thus gave rise to the name of the dramatic butte overlooking the Illinois River. (Macmillan Company, N.Y., 1919.)

=== Resort and state park ===
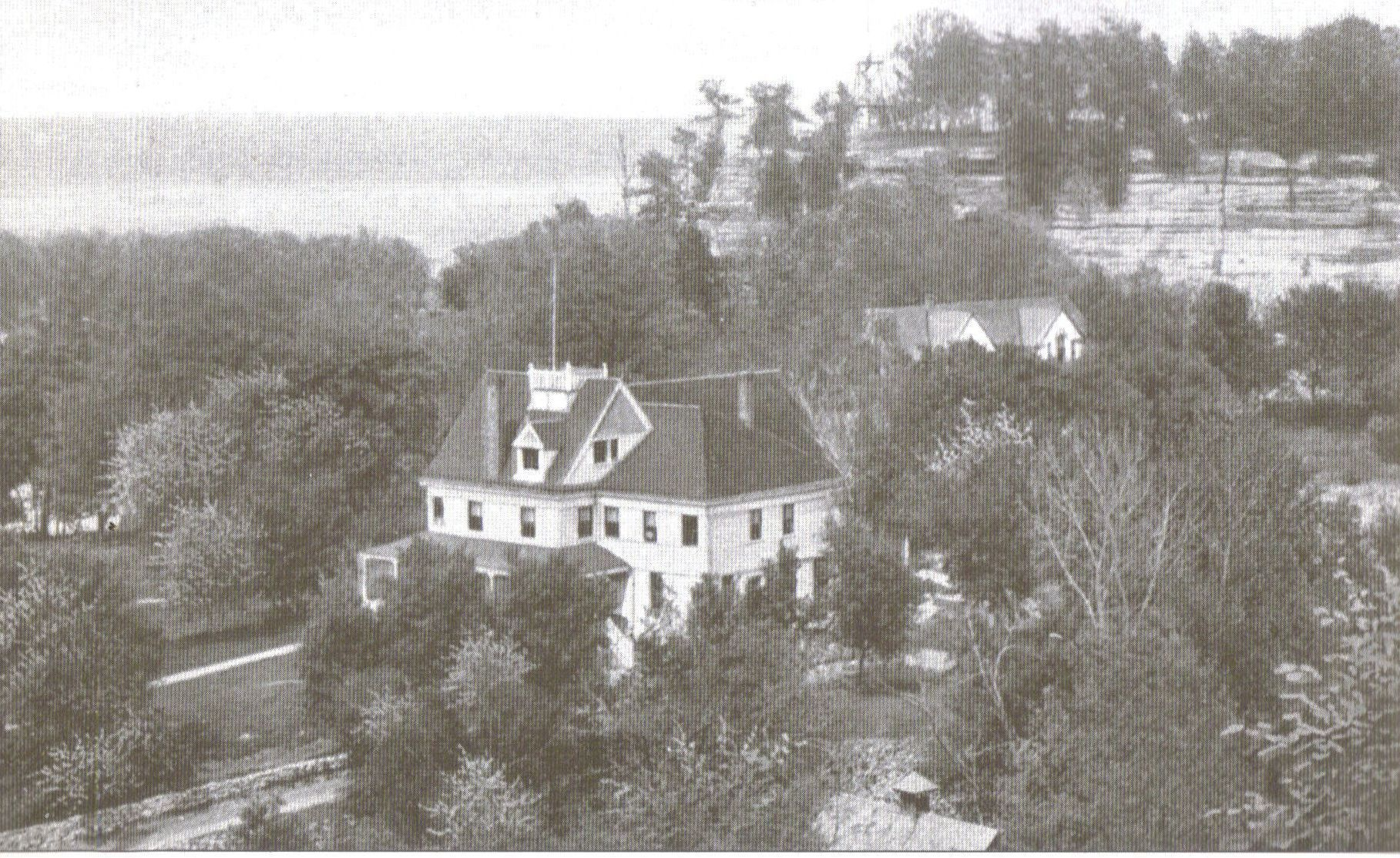
Ferdinand Walther constructed the Starved Rock Hotel for his resort, seen here c. 1905, which no longer exists. In 1911 he sold the resort to the State of Illinois. The "rock" is the bluff in the upper right.

Daniel Hitt purchased the land that is today occupied by Starved Rock State Park from the United States Government in 1835 for $85 as compensation for his tenure in the U.S. Army. He sold the land in 1890 to Ferdinand Walther for $15,000. Recognizing the potential for developing the land as a resort, Walther constructed the Starved Rock Hotel and a natural pool near the base of Starved Rock, as well as a concession stand and dance hall. The French and Native American heritage of the region also drew visitors to the site. Walthers set up a variety of walkable trails and harbored small boats near the hotel that made trips along the Illinois River. Visitors could also visit Deer Park (modern-day Matthiessen State Park) a few miles to the south.

With the growth of competitive sites, Walther struggled to keep the complex economically stable. In 1911, he sold the land to the Illinois State Parks Commission for $146,000. The commission was initially headquartered at Starved Rock State Park after the land was acquired. The state initially acquired 898 acres and opened Starved Rock State Park as a public facility in 1912.

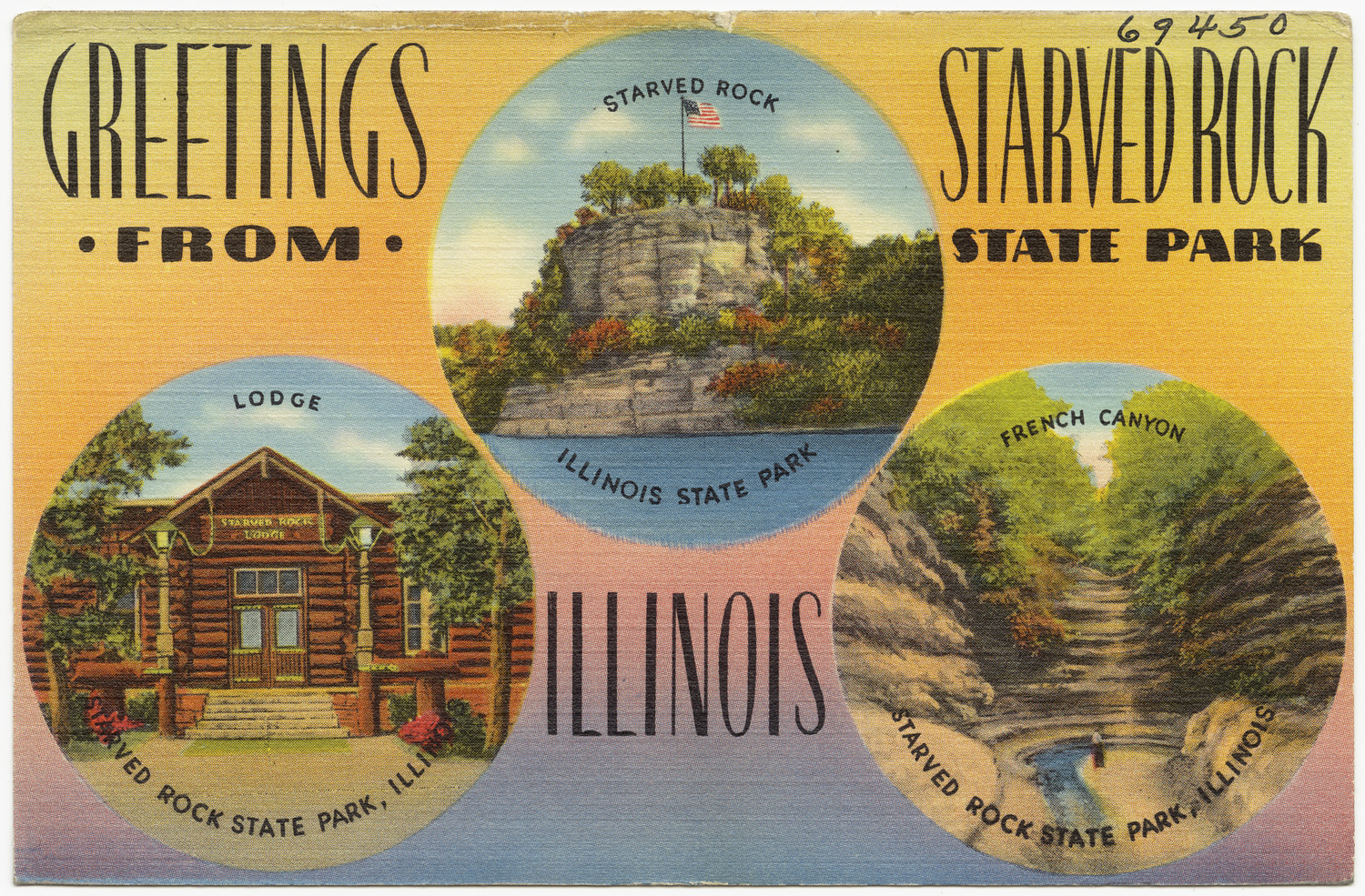
Postcard from the 1930s or 1940s showing various locations in the park.

During its early years, Starved Rock State Park was directly accessible only by railroad. Visitors had reached Starved Rock by rail and ferry since at least 1904, while the property was still a Walther-run resort. Between 1904 and 1908 more than 160,000 people used the ferry that connected Starved Rock to the electric railway line. In 1912, the year the park was opened to the public, attendance was 75,000. By the 1930s other state parks were opened in Illinois but Starved Rock State Park remained the most extensively used park in the system.

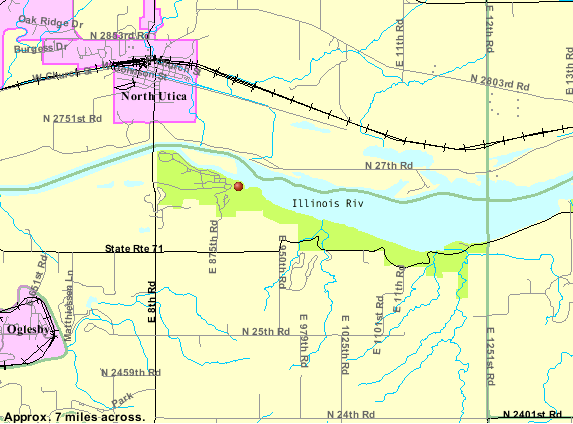
Starved Rock (red marker) in Starved Rock State Park (green).

Franklin D. Roosevelt's New Deal legislation in the 1930s called for the creation of the Civilian Conservation Corps (CCC) to provide jobs for young men. The focus of this group was to preserve natural areas in the rural United States. CCC Camp 614 was deployed to Starved Rock State Park from the Jefferson Barracks Military Post in Missouri. Unlike most CCC groups in the nation, Camp 614 included African Americans. The group, composed of roughly 200 men, constructed trails, shelters, and benches throughout the park. In 1933, the group was joined by Camp 1609 from Fort Sheridan via Readstown, Wisconsin. Camp 1609 constructed the Starved Rock Lodge, several surrounding log cabins, and a large parking lot. The lodge was particularly noted for its elegant fireplaces, constructed from limestone imported from Joliet. Men from camps 614 and 1609 lay more than 25 miles of trails. Camp 614 was eventually reassigned to Illini National Forest. The men were replaced by those of Camp 2601 from Fort Sheridan in 1934. Camp 2601 constructed the Wildcat Canyon bridge, among others.

When Illinois Route 71 was opened in 1942, it allowed easy automotive access from Chicago. Starved Rock was declared a National Historic Landmark in 1960. That same year, three women from the Chicago suburbs were brutally murdered in the park. Chester Weger was convicted of the murders and became Illinois longest-serving inmate. The murders were the subject of docuseries on HBO Max.

The butte has eroded 18 to 48 inches (46 to 122 cm) due to foot traffic since the park was developed. To curb this, the Illinois Young Adult Conservation Corps installed a platform and staircase on the landmark in 1981. The CCC-era Starved Rock Lodge and Cabins were added to the National Register of Historic Places on May 8, 1985. The Illinois Bureau of Tourism listed Starved Rock State Park as one of the "Seven Wonders of Illinois" in 2007. 2.1 million people visited the park in 2010.

== Archaeological sites and research ==
=== Starved Rock ===
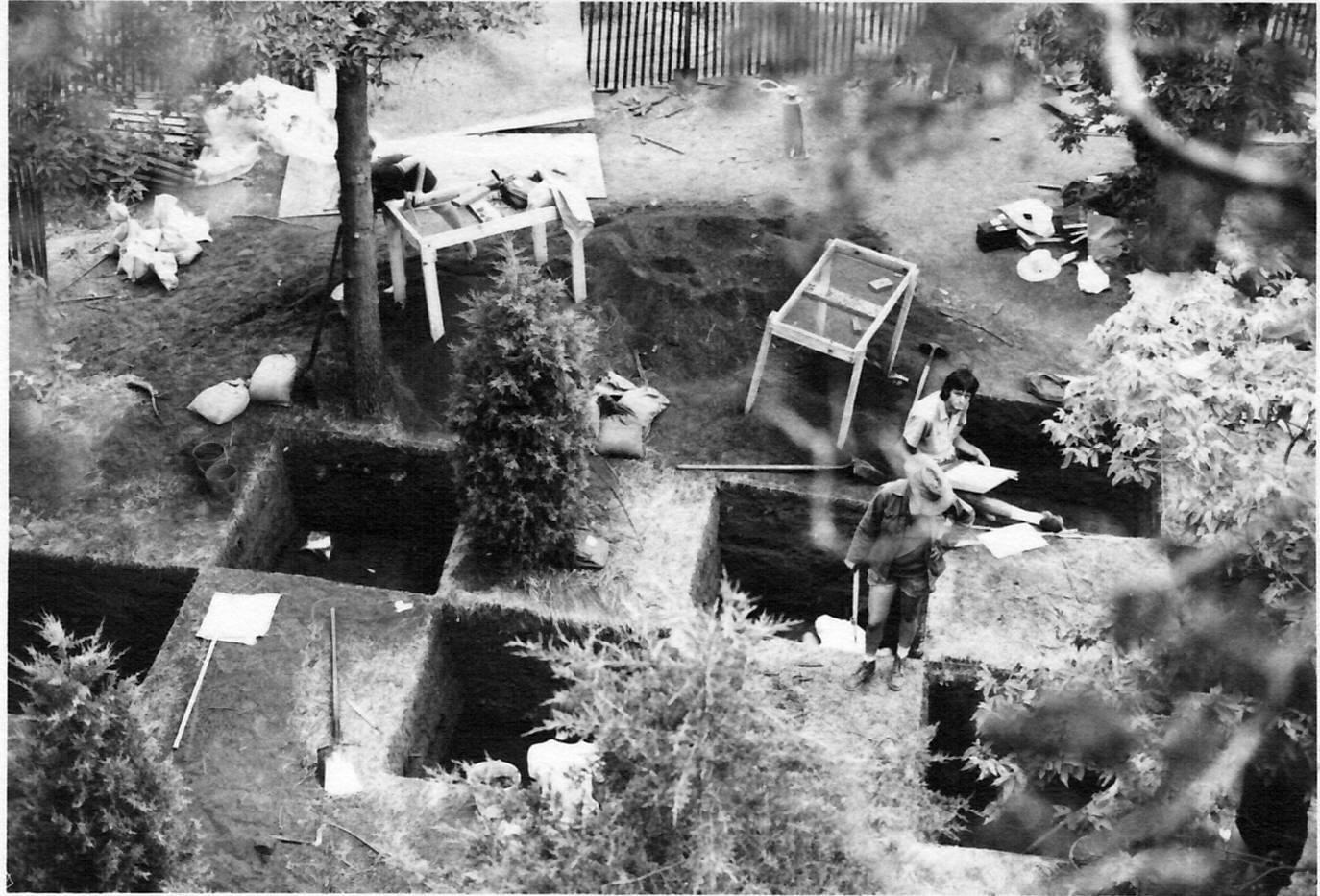
Starved Rock archeological dig 1974

The summit of Starved Rock was the site of archeological excavations in 1947–1949 by archaeologists from the Illinois State Museum and the University of Chicago. The research was continued in 1950 by an archaeologist from State Department of Public Works and Buildings who had joined the project the year before. Archaeologists from the University of Illinois Chicago restarted testing at the site for a season in 1974, and later an archaeologist from Illinois State University continued testing. The 1947–1950 excavations provided the "greater part of the knowledge of the archaeology of Starved Rock".

=== Corbin Farm ===
The Corbin Farm Site is a site of archaeological significance located within the park. Today, the site is part of a picnic area. Field investigations were done in 1992 and 1994 and pottery analysis determined that the site was primarily settled during the Late Woodland Period, during the second half of the First Millennium. The site, also known as the Salt Well Site, was the location of a farmstead from c. 1870–1940. Corbin Farm Site covers nearly 69,000 m^{2} and is located 10 m south of the Illinois River. Corbin Farm Site was added to the National Register of Historic Places on June 18, 1998, as part of the Archaeological Sites of Starved Rock Multiple Property Submission.

=== Hotel Plaza ===
Hotel Plaza Site is another archaeological site in the park that is listed on the National Register of Historic Places. Hotel Plaza was listed under the same Multiple Property Submission as Corbin Farm on June 18, 1998. Excavations in the 1940s, 1970s and 1990s revealed the presence of humans during several different cultural periods in North American history including, Paleo-Indian, Historic Native American, Archaic and Woodland. It is believed that Hotel Plaza was also the site of a large Native American village that helped support early French explorers in the region during the 17th and 18th centuries. In more modern historic times the site was the location of a hotel within the state park.

=== Little Beaver ===
The Little Beaver Site is an archaeological site that has been the location of multiple settlements from various periods including, Archaic, Early Woodland, Middle Woodland and Upper Mississippian. Based on artifacts recovered the primary period of occupation at Little Beaver was Middle Woodland. Little Beaver is a village and mound site and contains two groups of mounds. In total, there are 13 mounds within the 98,000 m^{2} Little Beaver Site. The site was added to the National Register of Historic Places on June 18, 1998, as part of the Archaeological Sites of Starved Rock State Park Multiple Property Submission.

=== Shaky Shelter ===
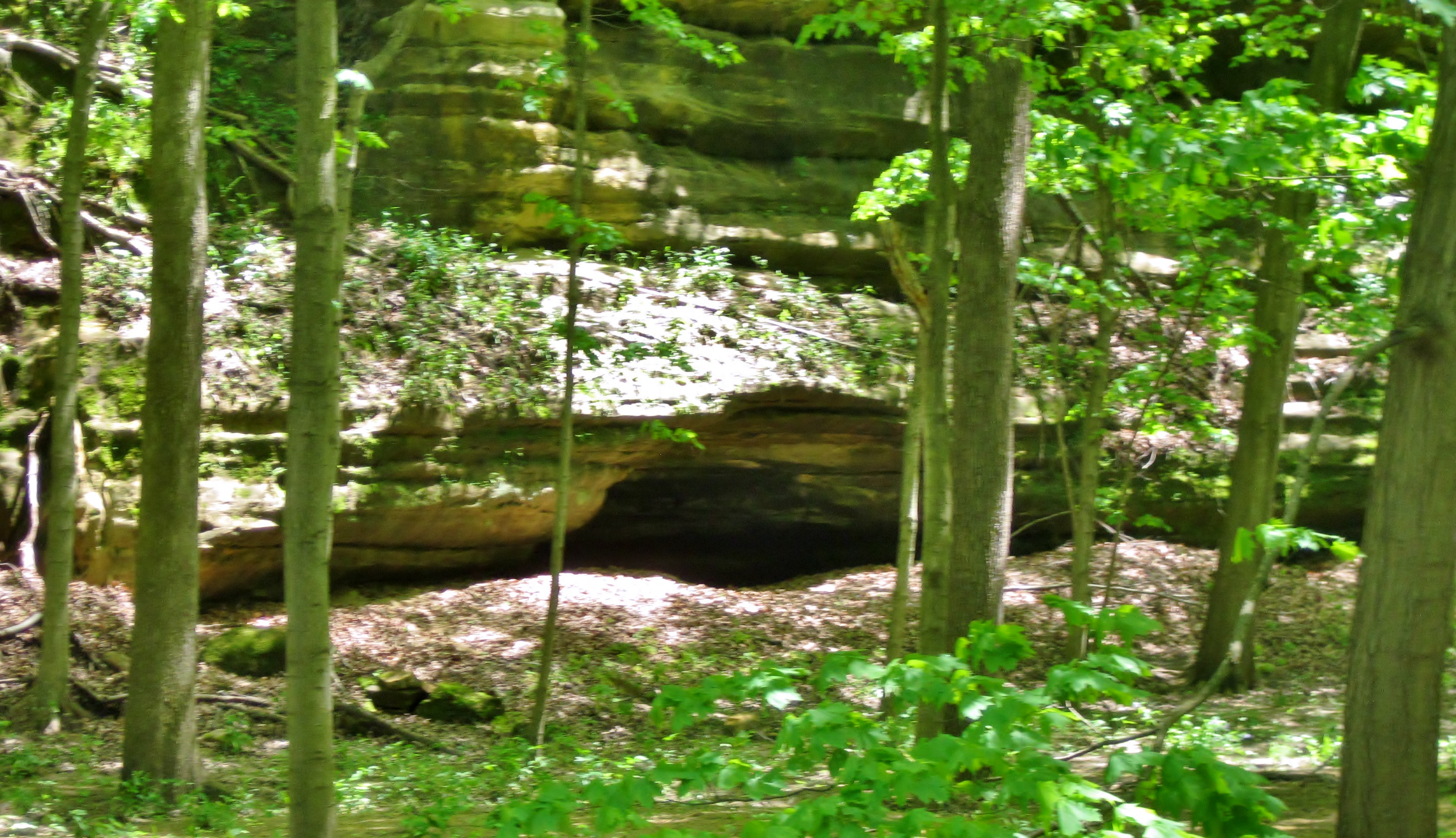
Shaky Shelter Site

Shaky Shelter Site is the location of a prehistoric rock shelter site at the base of the sandstone bluff within the state park's Kaskaskia Canyon. In 1991 subsurface tests of the 183 m^{2} shelter site were made and determined that evidence existed only for occupation by Upper Mississippian groups. Shaky Shelter Site was added to the National Register of Historic Places on the same date, June 18, 1998, and as part of the same Multiple Property Submission as the Corbin Farm, Hotel Plaza and Little Beaver sites.

=== Other sites ===
Besides the five sites – Starved Rock, Corbin Farm, Hotel Plaza, Little Beaver, and Shaky Shelter – entered on the National Register of Historic Places, there are several other sites of archaeological significance found within the park. Open-air occupation sites are archaeological sites that occur within open areas, such as floodplains or uplands. There are 21 open-air occupation sites within Starved Rock State Park, as of 1998 four of those had been subject to subsurface examination. Those sites include: Hotel Plaza Site, Starved Rock Site, Simonson Site, and Devil's Nose Site.

Rock shelters, such as the one found at the Shaky Shelter Site, are areas used by human inhabitants that occur in rock overhangs that offer a moderate level of protection against the elements. By 1998 14 occupied rock shelter sites had been identified within the state park. At the time of Shaky Shelter's National Register of Historic Places listing it was the only rock shelter in the park determined to have undisturbed prehistoric features of archaeological significance.

At the time of the 1998 addition of the Corbin Farm and Little Beaver sites to the National Register, it had been determined that there were three "village and mound" sites within the park. Besides Corbin Farm and Little Beaver, the Simonson site, an open-air occupation site, is also considered a village and mound site. Simonson Site has faced significant alterations over the years

== Flora and fauna ==
=== Flora ===
Approximately 150 types of plants grow at Starved Rock State Park. On the sandstone cliffs of Starved Rock State Park white pine, Canada yew and northern white cedar are found; these plants are more commonly found further north. On the surfaces of the canyons and cliffs, where it is cooler, other plants are found, examples include: harebell, reindeer lichen, and mountain holly. A non-vascular plant, liverwort, is also found on the sandstone surfaces throughout Starved Rock State Park. The Indian cucumber root, a rare lily in Illinois, was found in the park in 1939. A lady's slipper orchid has also been found in the park. It, like other orchids, is susceptible to invasive plant species and changes in habitat.

=== Fauna ===
The stretch of the Illinois River that travels through the park contains several types of game fish that can be caught by anglers. These species include: catfish, bullhead, white bass, sauger, walleye, carp and crappie. However, the recent appearance of the invasive silver carp or Asian carp has greatly affected native fish populations and has likely spurred their decline. No official studies have been undertaken yet to confirm this, but local anglers have reported large catches of silver carp absent any native species.

== Climate ==
Northern Illinois has a humid continental climate, featuring mild summers and cold winters capable of producing snow storms. The highest recorded temperature at the park was 112 °F (44 °C) in 1936, and the record low was −25 °F (−32 °C) in 1985. January is the coldest month at the park, July is the warmest, and June is the wettest. Starved Rock State Park averages 35.7 inches (910 mm) of precipitation.

Climate data for Starved Rock State Park
Month	Jan	Feb	Mar	Apr	May	Jun	Jul	Aug	Sep	Oct	Nov	Dec	Year
Mean daily maximum °F (°C)	30 (−1)	37 (3)	49 (9)	62 (17)	73 (23)	82 (28)	85 (29)	83 (28)	77 (25)	65 (18)	49 (9)	36 (2)	61 (16)
Mean daily minimum °F (°C)	12 (−11)	18 (−8)	29 (−2)	39 (4)	50 (10)	59 (15)	63 (17)	61 (16)	53 (12)	41 (5)	30 (−1)	18 (−8)	39 (4)
Average precipitation inches (mm)	1.45 (37)	1.32 (34)	2.60 (66)	3.44 (87)	4.00 (102)	4.13 (105)	3.64 (92)	3.78 (96)	3.50 (89)	2.59 (66)	2.95 (75)	2.27 (58)	35.67 (907)
Source: The Weather Channel

== Recreation ==
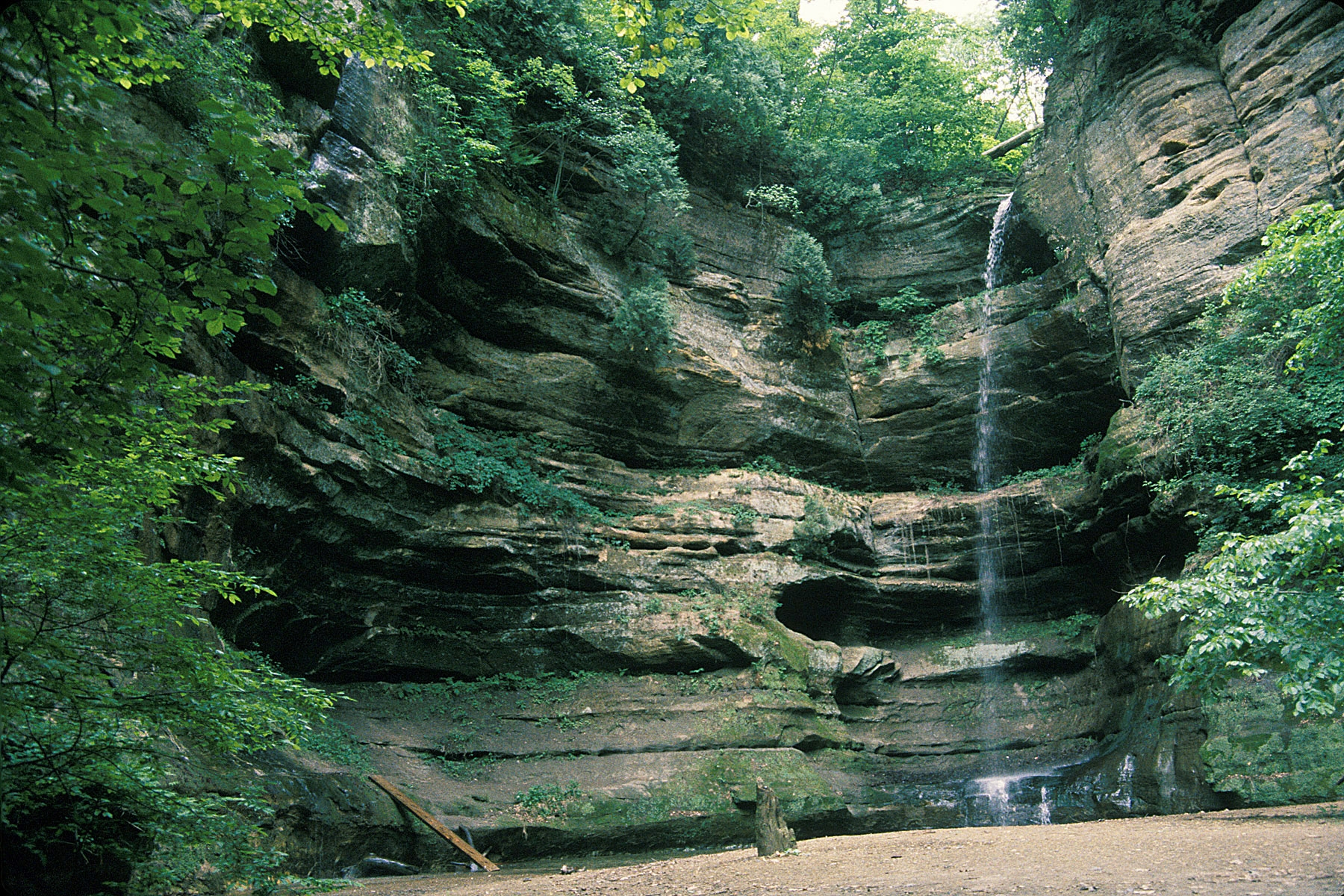
Wildcat Canyon Waterfall

There are over 13 miles (21 km) of hiking trails in Starved Rock State Park. The trail system received the National Recreation Trail designation in 1981. There are 18 deep canyons in the park; French, LaSalle, Ottawa and St. Louis Canyons feature the more long-lasting waterfalls at Starved Rock. A trail along the river offers scenic views from attractions such as Lover's Leap Overlook, Eagle Cliff Overlook and Beehive Overlook. Camping, boating and fishing are among the other activities offered in the park. There are 133 campsites at Starved Rock State Park, of which 100 can be reserved. There are also horseback riding trails at Starved Rock on the far western side of the park.

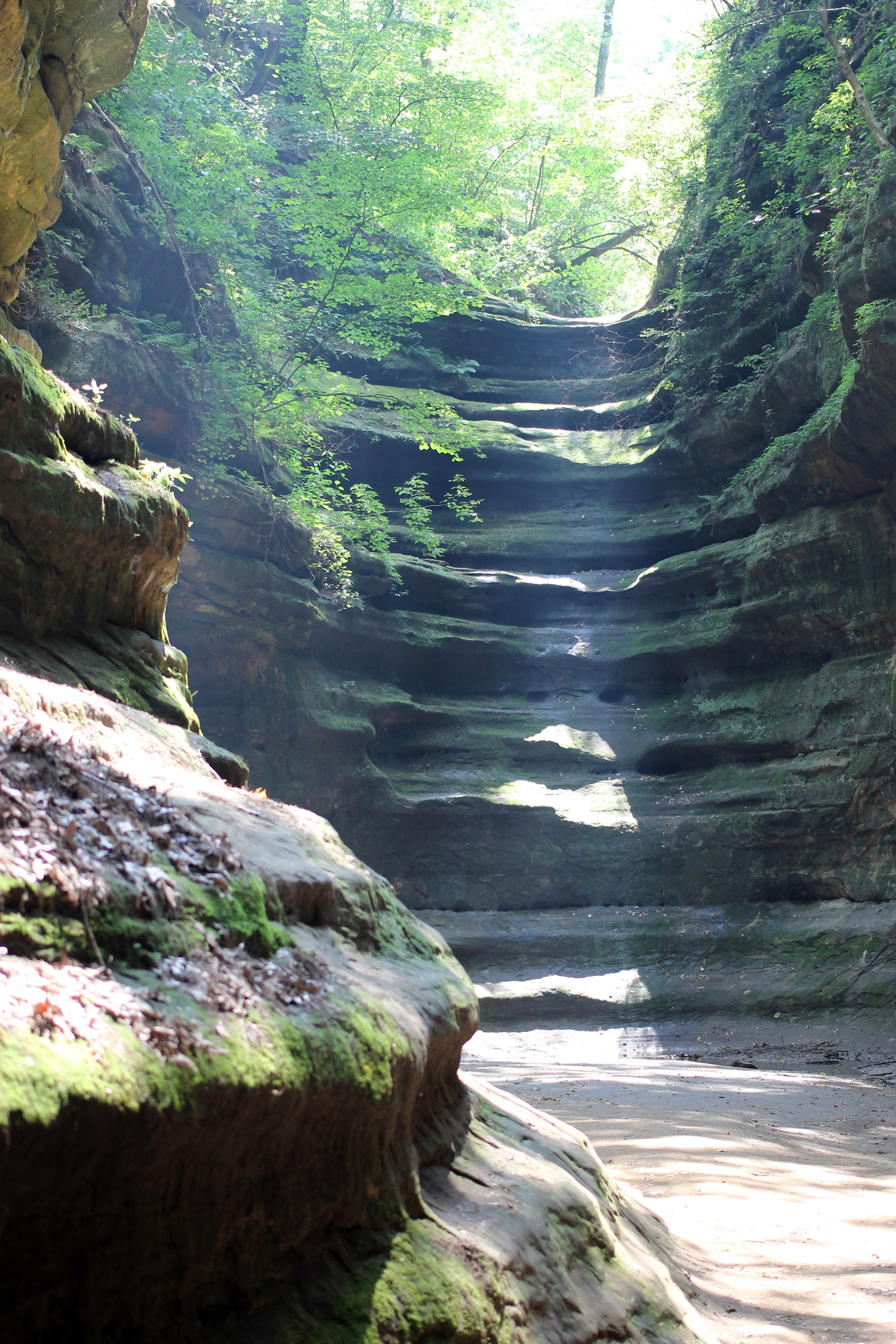
French Canyon, August 2013

From December through February bald eagles can be viewed at the park, either fishing below the Starved Rock Dam, where turbulent waters stay unfrozen during the cold winter months or roosting on the Leopold or Plum Island. The Starved Rock State Park Visitor Center loans out binoculars to aspiring birders in exchange for the birder's driver's license. During the winter, sports such as ice skating, tobogganing, cross-country skiing and sledding are allowed in parts of the park. Snowmobiling is not allowed at Starved Rock State Park. Waterfalls become constantly changing ice falls during the winter as well. 14 of 18 waterfalls transform into scenic ice falls, with those at LaSalle, French, St. Louis, Tonty, Wildcat, Hennepin, Ottawa and Kaskaskia Canyons being especially scenic. Ice climbing is another winter activity allowed in select canyons.

== Lodge and cabins ==
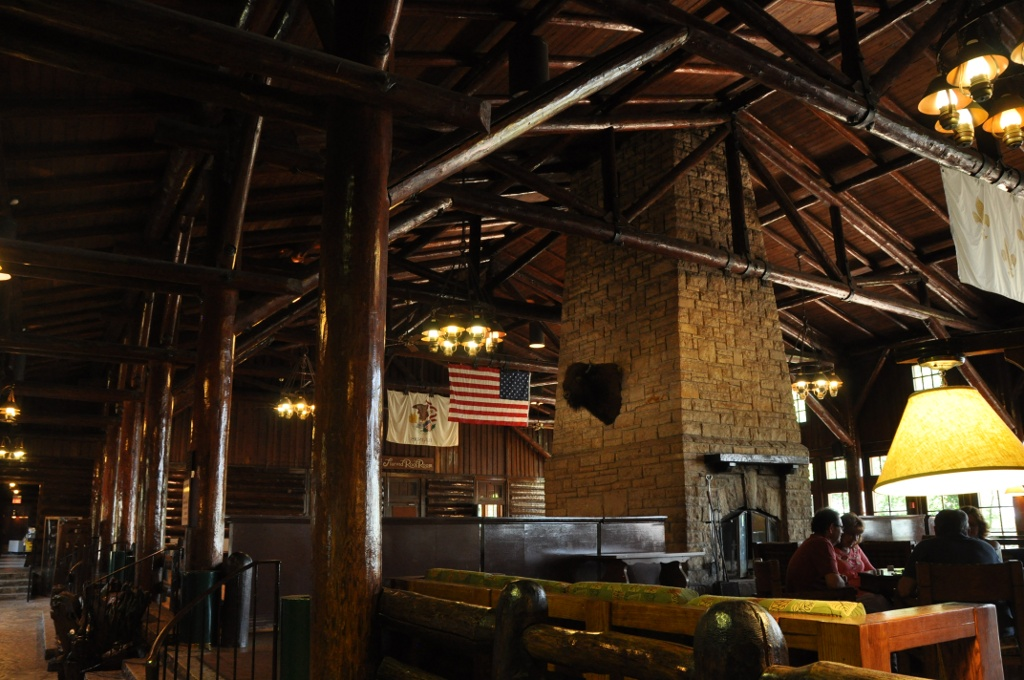
Interior view of the lodge

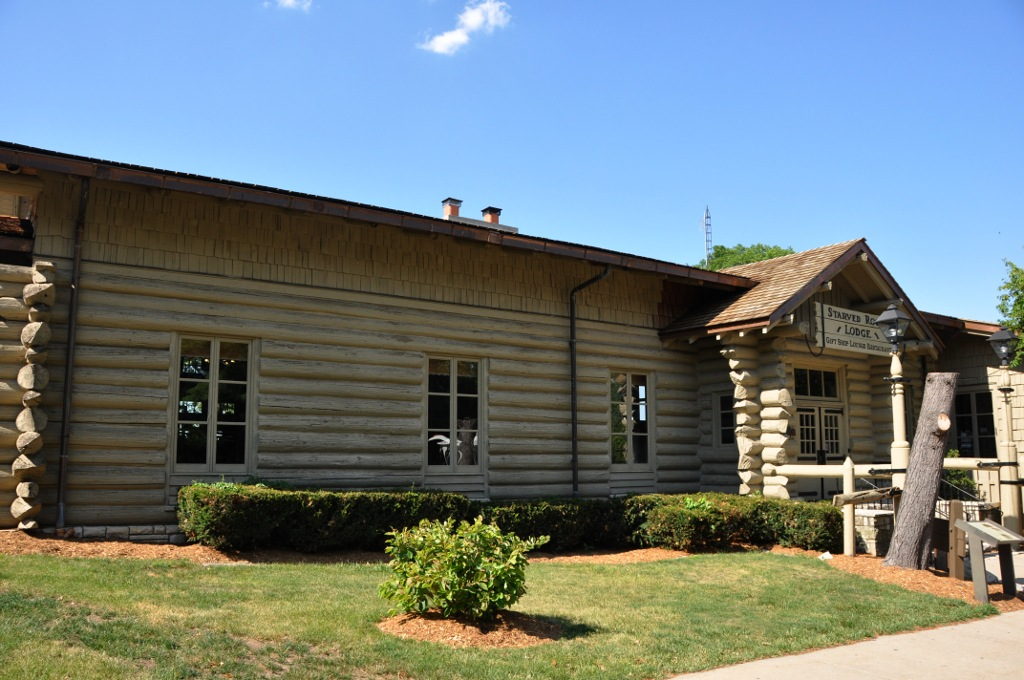
Exterior view of the lodge

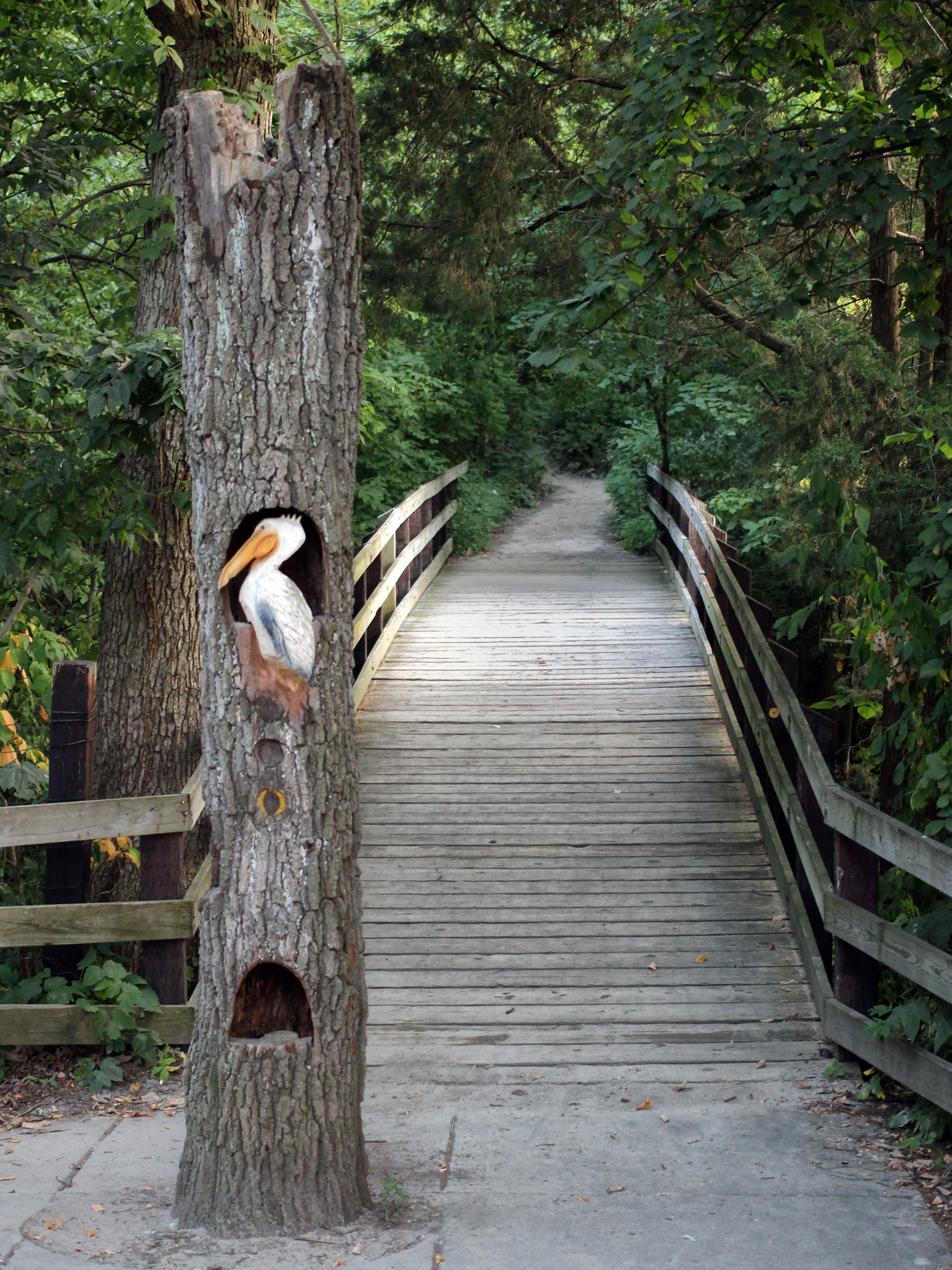
Pelican wood carving in the remains of a tree near the lodge, one of many such on the lodge grounds.

=== History ===
Starved Rock Lodge and Cabins were built from 1933 to 1939 by the Depression-Era Civilian Conservation Corps. The lodge and cabins originally cost between $200,000 and $300,000 to build. Another $200,000 was spent on the construction of a 48-room hotel wing after the original construction was completed. Other alterations were completed between 1986 and 1988 when a major renovation added amenities such as a heated swimming pool and a 30-room addition to the hotel. The Lodge and Cabins are operated as the Starved Rock Lodge and Conference Center.

=== Architecture ===
The Starved Rock Lodge and Cabins were designed by Joseph F. Booton and constructed by the Civilian Conservation Corps. The lodge has a central lounge, known as the Great Room, and hotel wings and a dining room wing. On its exterior, the lodge is primarily constructed of stone, unhewed logs, clapboard and wood shingles. Booton's design intended to impress upon visitors the idea of a "woodsy retreat". This is seen in the way he designed round log purlins whose unevenly hewn ends extend beyond the lodge's eaves. Surrounding the lodge are 12 cabins. Two large cabins are sited just west of the lodge while the other ten are situated across a steep ravine, known as Fox Canyon, from the lodge. The cabins are constructed of unhewn logs with random corner notches and sit in heavily wooded areas meant to evoke a "camping in the woods" feeling. The 12 cabins and the lodge cover an area of 17 acres (6.9 ha). Despite the changes through modernization the lodge still retains much of the charm its architect intended.

=== Historic significance ===
Starved Rock State Park's Lodge and Cabins were listed on the U.S. National Register of Historic Places on May 8, 1985, as part of the Illinois State Park Lodges and Cabins Thematic Resources Multiple Property Submission. By the National Register's criteria the Lodge and Cabins are considered significant in the areas of architecture and entertainment/recreation. The size of the lodge and the land area the cabins cover are both nearly unrivaled in the Illinois state park system; only Pere Marquette State Park's Lodge and Cabins come close.

== Lock and dam ==
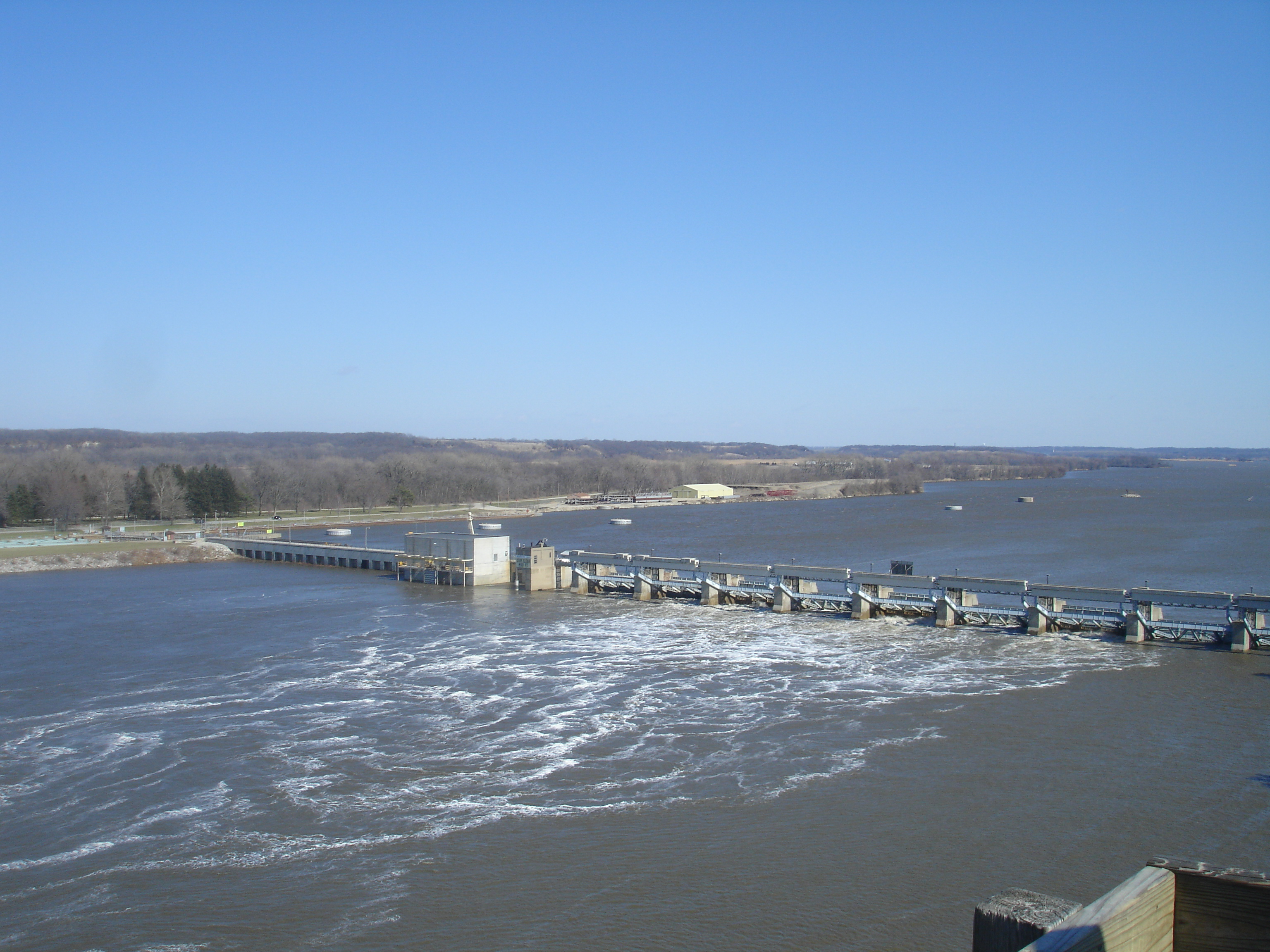
Starved Rock Lock and Dam facility viewed from The Rock.

Starved Rock Lock and Dam, also known as Lock and Dam No. 6, is a lock and dam facility managed by the U.S. Army Corps of Engineers along the Illinois River. It is part of the Illinois Waterway and was constructed between 1926 and 1933. The lock and dam was added to the National Register of Historic Places as the Starved Rock Lock and Dam Historic District in 2004.

== In popular culture ==
The ending scene of the 1989 fantasy drama movie Prancer was filmed inside the park at Devil's Nose, and Park Conservation later fined the movie company $1,800 for chopping down a 125-year-old tree. Due to the incident, no further motion picture production has been allowed in the park.

== See also ==
- Buffalo Rock State Park
- Grand Village of the Illinois
- Matthiessen State Park
- Plum Island Bald Eagle Refuge
- Starved Rock Entertainment
