= Brandon Road Lock and Dam =

Waterway control in Illinois, USA

- Brandon Road Lock and Dam Historic District
- U.S. National Register of Historic Places
- U.S. Historic district
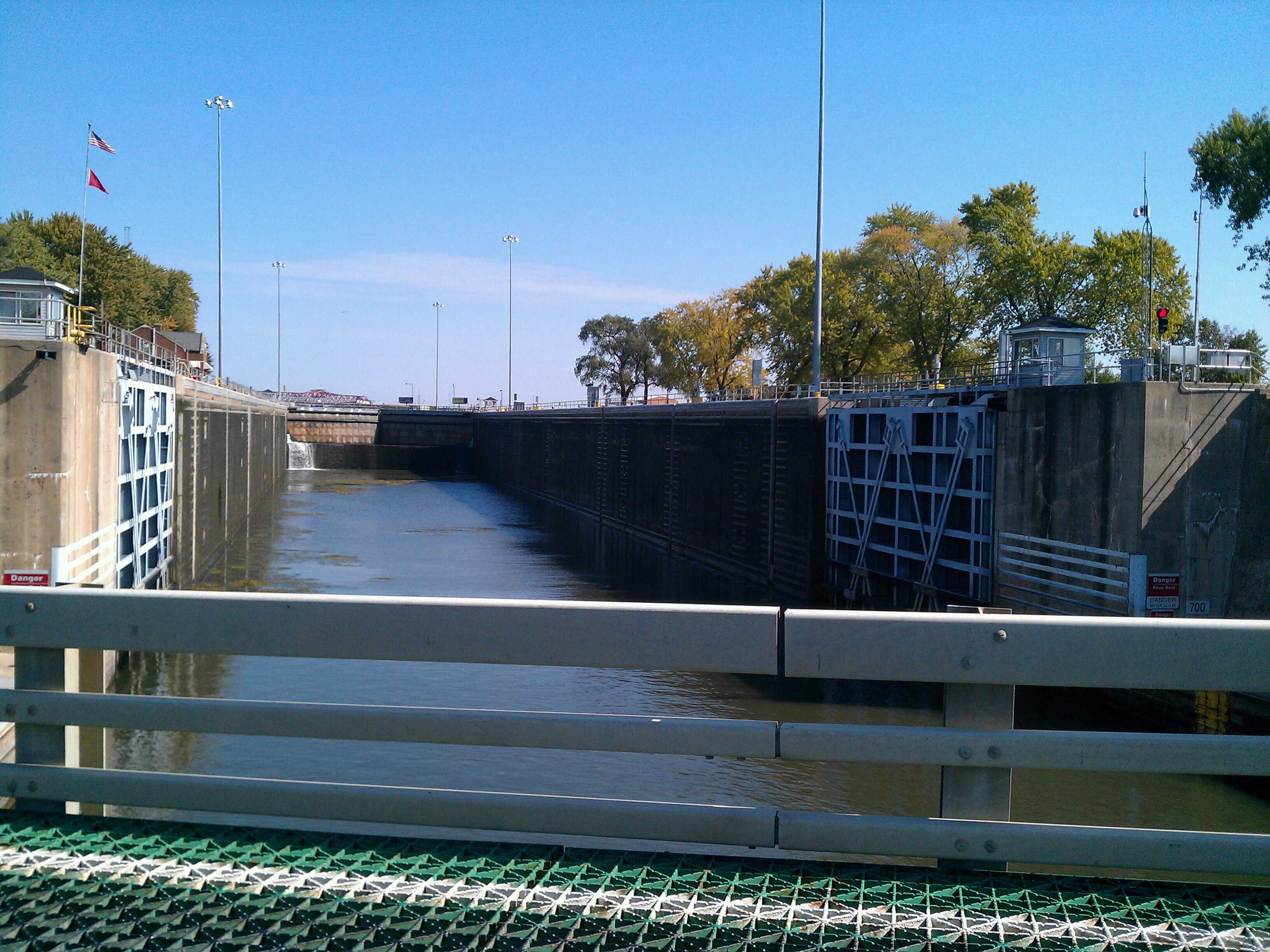

- Location within Illinois Location within the United States
- Location: 1100 Brandon Rd., Joliet, Illinois
- Coordinates: 41.50329°N 88.10309°W
- Area: 92.9 acres (37.6 ha)
- Built: 1933
- Architect: Smith, Walter Mickle
- Architectural style: Lock and Dam, Other
- MPS: Illinois Waterway Navigation System Facilities MPS
- NRHP reference No.: 04000163
- Added to NRHP: March 10, 2004

The Brandon Road Lock and Dam is a lock and dam complex along the Des Plaines River in Joliet, Illinois. The complex was built from 1927 to 1933 in conjunction with the construction of the Illinois Waterway, which allowed for barge travel between Lake Michigan and the Mississippi River. The lock and dam are also used to regulate water levels on the river between Lockport and Joliet. The lock at the complex is 110 by 600 feet (34 by 183 m) and has four Miter gates, with a 34-foot (10.3 meter) drop. The dam is 2,372 feet (723 m) long and includes concrete and earthen segments. The complex also includes a disused junction lock for the Illinois and Michigan Canal, the control station for the lock, and a modern pump house.

The complex was added to the National Register of Historic Places as the Brandon Road Lock and Dam Historic District on March 10, 2004.

In the 2020s the dam is the focal point of one of the largest projects ever undertaken to curb the spread of an invasive species. The hope of the BRIP (Brandon Road Interbasin Project) is to keep Asian carp from establishing a population in the Great Lakes.

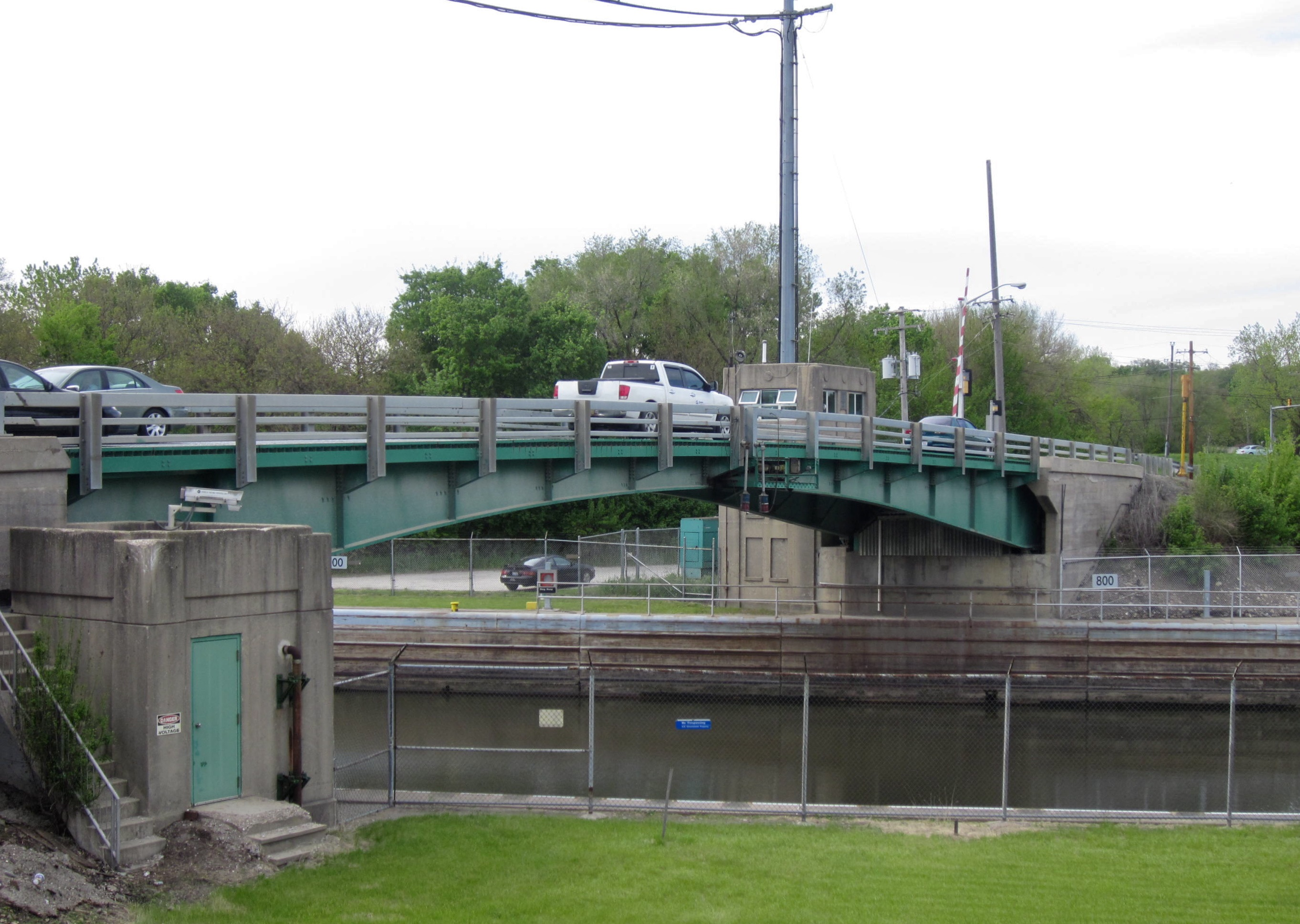
The 1932-built bascule bridge spanning the lock channel
