= Starved Rock Lock and Dam =

Dam in Illinois, United States

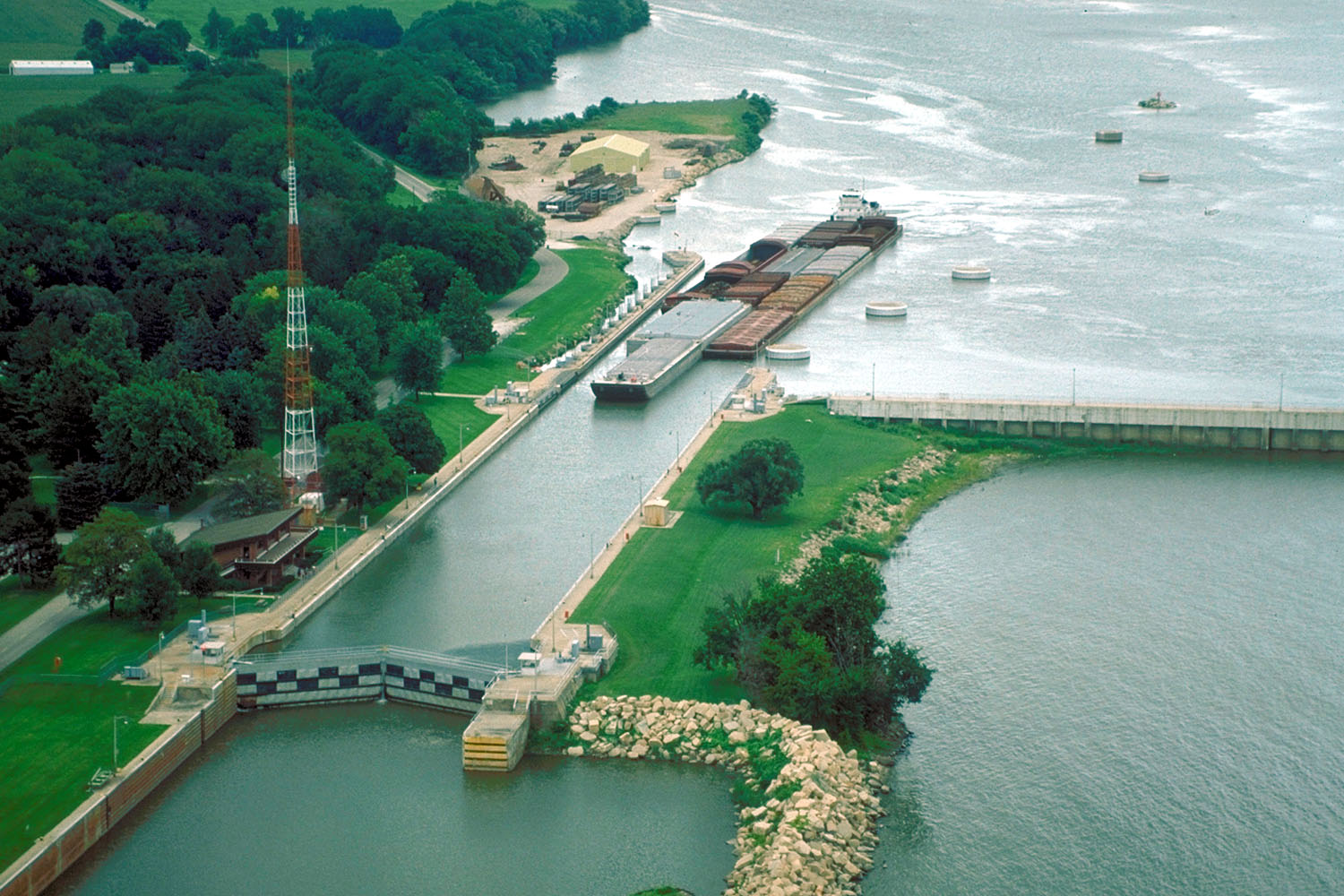
- Barges passing through Starved Rock Lock and Dam
- Interactive map of Starved Rock Lock and Dam
- Official name: Lock and Dam No. 6
- Location: LaSalle County/Utica, Illinois (Starved Rock State Park), United States
- Coordinates: 41°19′21″N 88°59′8″W
- Status: Operational
- Construction began: 1926
- Opening date: 1933
- Operator: United States Army Corps of Engineers

Dam and spillways
- Type of dam: Gravity dam
- Impounds: Illinois River
- Height: 34 ft (10 m)
- Length: 1,310 ft (400 m)
- Width (base): 33 ft (10 m)
- Spillway type: Controlled

Starved Rock Lock and Dam, also known as Lock and Dam No. 6, is a lock and dam facility managed by the U.S. Army Corps of Engineers along the Illinois River, near Starved Rock. It is part of the Illinois Waterway and was constructed between 1926 and 1933. The lock and dam was added to the National Register of Historic Places as the Starved Rock Lock and Dam Historic District in 2004.

== Location ==
Along the original Illinois Waterway, Starved Rock Lock and Dam is the southernmost facility. The lock and dam are located along the Illinois River near the north central Illinois village of Utica. The lock and dam is at river mile 231 just upstream from Plum Island. The facility is presently operated by the U.S. Army Corps of Engineers.

== History ==
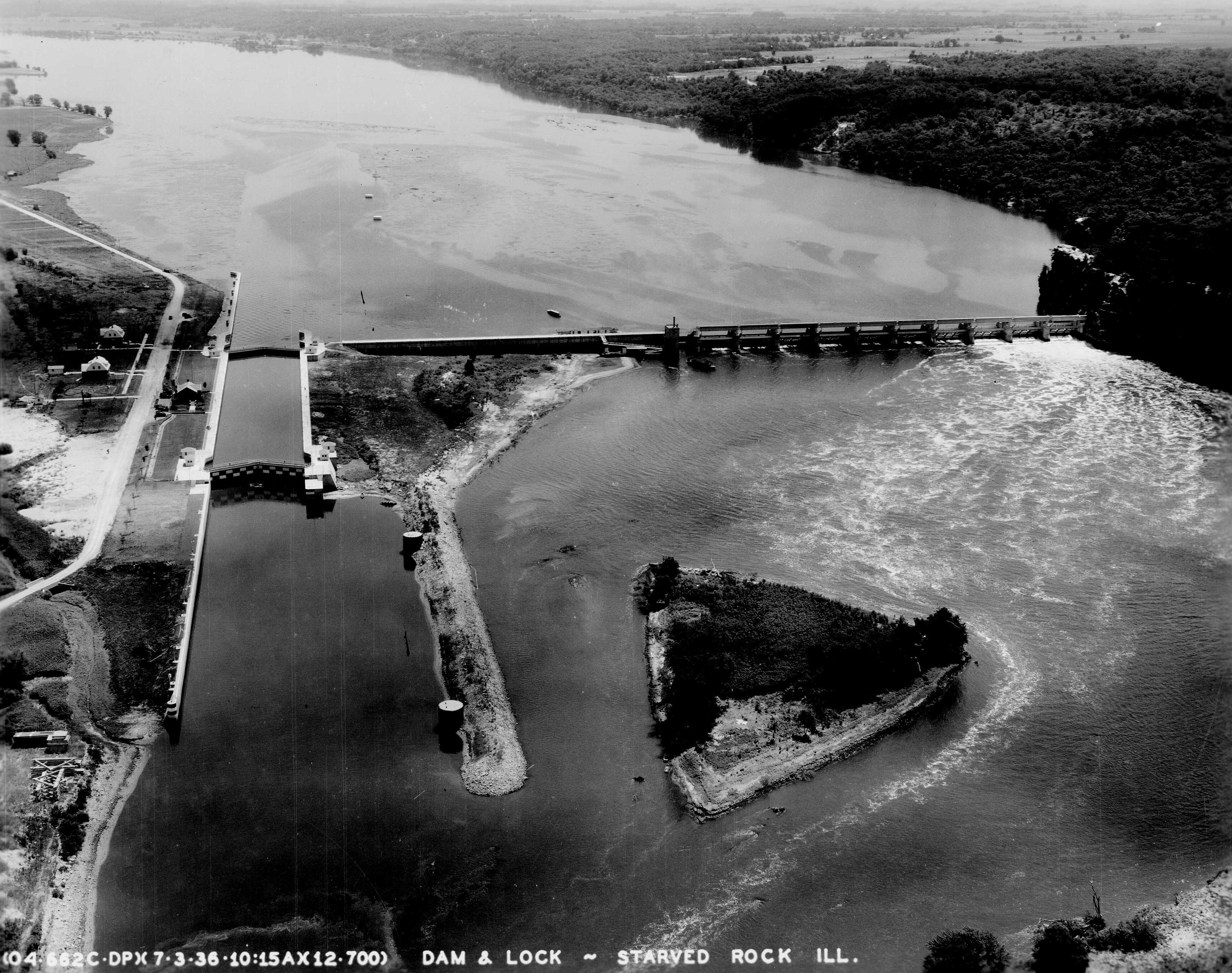
Starved Rock Lock and Dam in 1936

The Starved Rock Lock and Dam was constructed between 1926 and 1933 as an element of the Illinois Waterway. The Waterway was a project designed to provide a navigable channel from the Great Lakes to the Gulf of Mexico via the Mississippi River. The contract for construction of the lock and dam was originally awarded in 1923 but fell through when the contractor failed to show up for the contract signing. Following a period of time during which land litigation issues were cleared, a second contract was awarded in 1926. The lock and dam was about 95 percent complete when the state of Illinois fell upon financial difficulty and the project was turned over to the federal government for completion. Under the authority of the Rivers and Harbors Act of 1930 the federal government oversaw the completion of Starved Rock Lock and Dam in 1933. Construction of the facility cost US$4,462,737; of that amount, $3,577,419 was provided by the state and $885,318 was federal money.

== Design ==
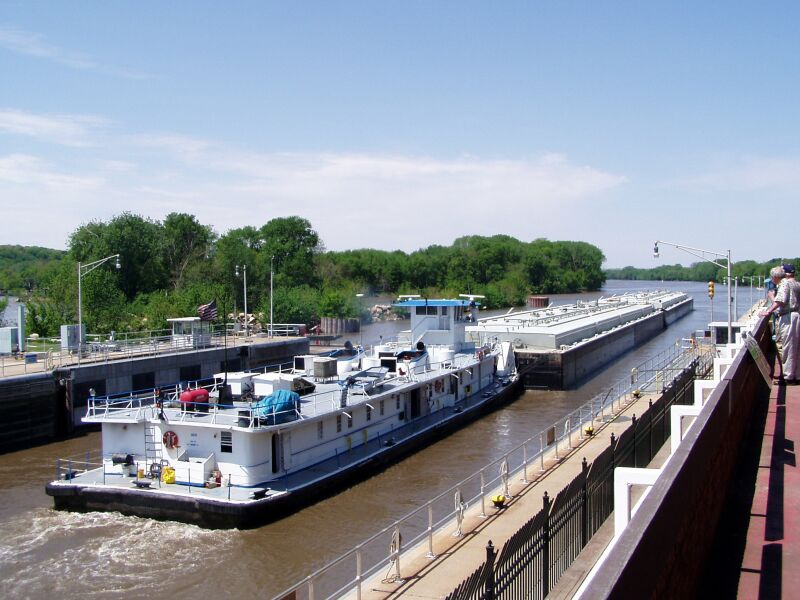
A barge being towed downstream through the Starved Rock lock.

Starved Rock Lock and Dam features a straight-crested, reinforced concrete gravity dam 1,310 feet (400 m) long. The dam consists of a head gate of 518 feet (158 m) and a controlled spillway of 714 feet (218 m). The dam is 33 feet (10 m) wide at its base, 22 feet 3 inches (6.78 m) wide at the crest of the head gate and 50 feet 6 inches (15.39 m) wide at the crest of the spillway. The dam's height above the riverbed varies from 21 to 34 feet (6 to 10 m).

The lock at Starved Rock Lock and Dam is an Ohio River Standard navigational lock of 110 by 600 feet (34 by 183 m). The lock has a drop/lift of about 18 feet (5 m). The chamber of the lock is formed by two parallel gravity section walls 38 feet (12 m) tall on the north and south. These are framed horizontally by two miter gates at the east and west ends of the lock.

Walter Mickle Smith was hired as Chief Design Engineer for the Illinois Waterway Project by Mortimer Grant Barnes, Illinois Governor Frank O. Lowden's appointee to oversee the Waterway Project. Thus, Mickle designed the facilities at Starved Rock Lock and Dam. Legislation which codified the construction of the Waterway only stipulated the general design and location of the locks and dams along the Illinois River; the details were left to Barnes, Smith and other engineers. Barnes had 20 years' experience as a civil engineer and had worked as an assistant to the engineer in charge of the construction of the Panama Canal locks when Lowden tapped him to head the project. Smith worked with Barnes on the Panama Canal project; they had both resigned in 1907 to go to work for the New York Board of Water Supply. Together the two men also formed a general hydraulic and construction engineering firm.

== Hydroelectric power plant ==
A hydroelectric power station generates a peak of 7,600 kW of electricity, and is operated by the city of Peru, Illinois. The power plant has experienced two fires since its construction.

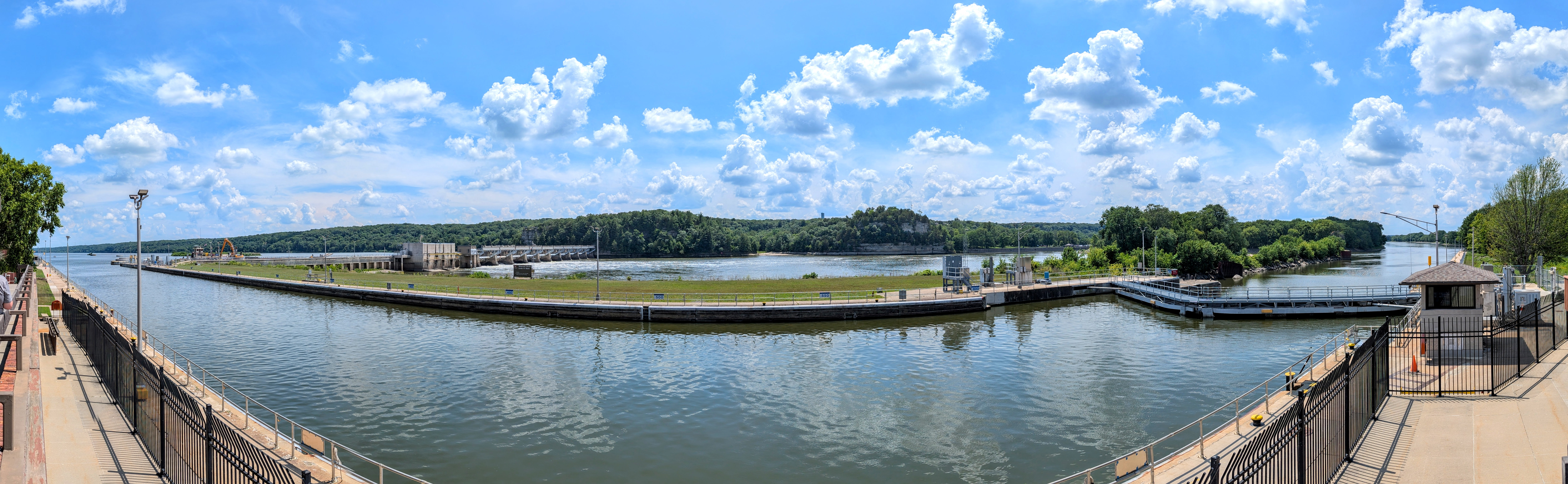
Panoramic view of the Starved Rock Lock and Dam from the visitor center, with Starved Rock at Starved Rock State Park visible across the river

== Historic district ==
- Starved Rock Lock and Dam Historic District
- U.S. National Register of Historic Places
- U.S. Historic district
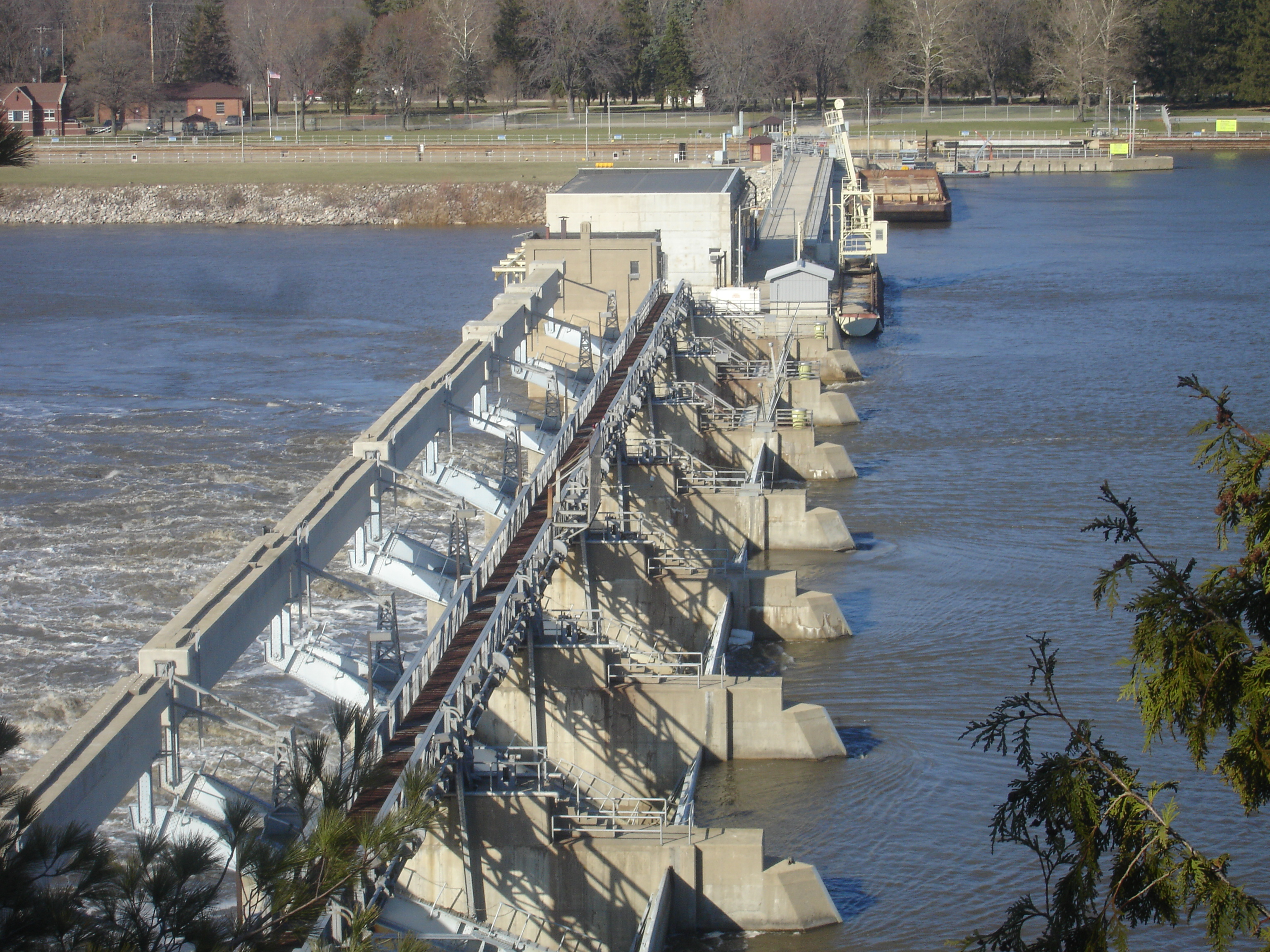
- A close-up of the dam at Lock and Dam No. 6

- Location within Illinois Location within the United States
- Nearest city: Ottawa, Illinois
- Area: 27.9 acres (11.3 ha)
- Built: 1933
- Architect: Walter Mickle Smith
- MPS: Illinois Waterway Navigation System Facilities MPS
- NRHP reference No.: 04000166
- Added to NRHP: March 10, 2004

On March 10, 2004, the Starved Rock Lock and Dam was listed on the National Register of Historic Places as the Starved Rock Lock and Dam Historic District. It was listed as part of the Illinois Waterway Navigation System Facilities Multiple Property Submission. Starved Rock was deemed eligible for the listing when the rest of the Illinois Waterway was also determined eligible; the day Starved Rock Lock and Dam was listed the other 7 lock and dam sites on the Waterway were also listed on the National Register of Historic Places.

The district has significance in three areas. According to the National Register of Historic Places' criteria, those are: engineering, transportation and maritime history. The historic district consists of five total buildings and structures. One building and two structures are contributing members to the historic district and two buildings are considered non-contributing members. Starved Rock Lock and Dam Historic District covers 27.95 acres (113,100 m^{2}).

== See also ==
- Starved Rock State Park
