= Dresden Island Lock and Dam =

- Dresden Island Lock and Dam Historic District
- U.S. National Register of Historic Places
- U.S. Historic district
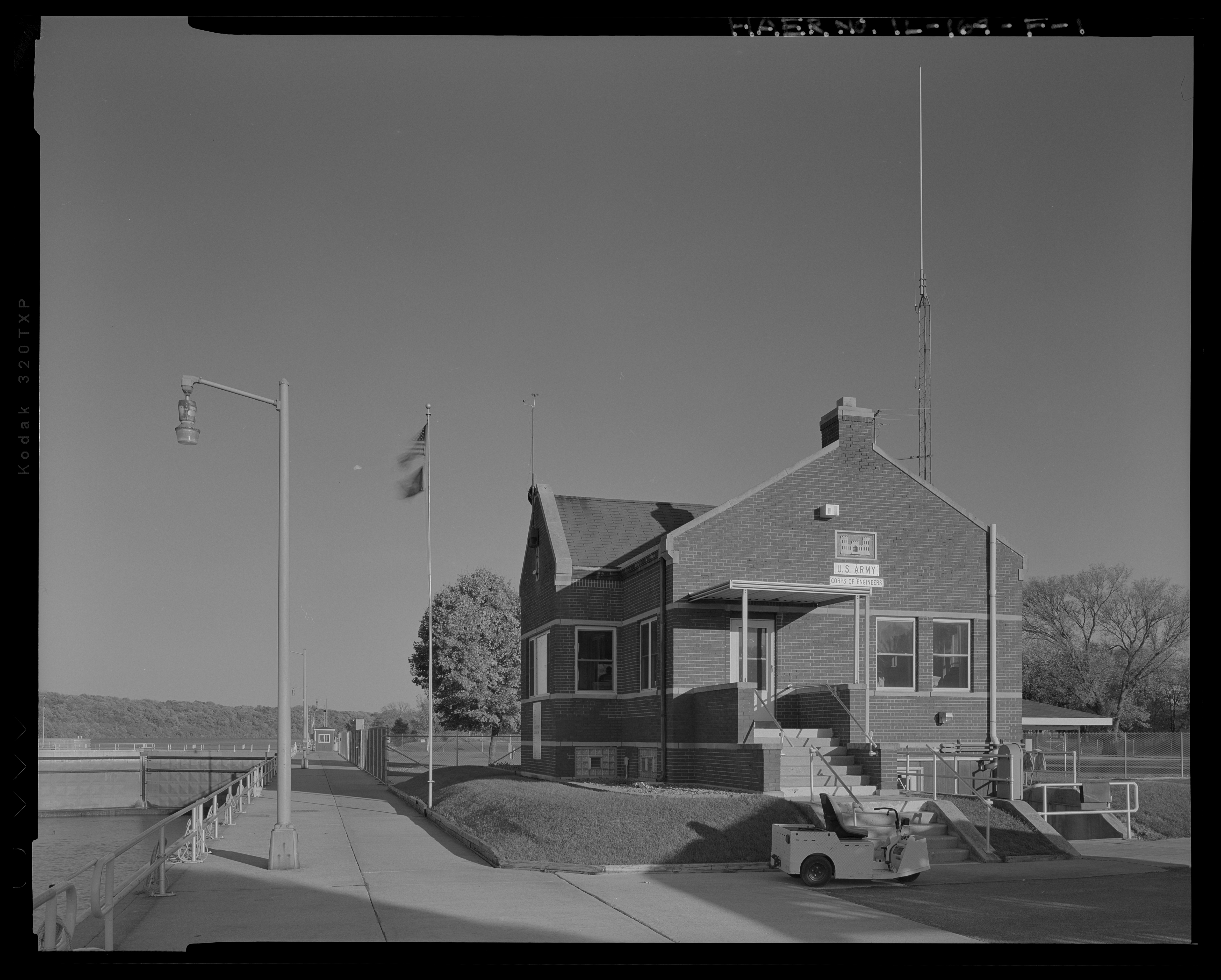
- The dam's control station, with the lock to the left

- Location within Illinois Location within the United States
- Location: 7521 N. Lock Rd., Morris, Illinois
- Coordinates: 41.3998°N 88.28132°W
- Area: 23.4 acres (9.5 ha)
- Built: 1933
- Architect: Smith, Walter Mickle
- Architectural style: Lock and Dam
- MPS: Illinois Waterway Navigation System Facilities MPS
- NRHP reference No.: 04000164
- Added to NRHP: March 10, 2004

The Dresden Island Lock and Dam is a 23.4-acre (9.5 ha) Lock and Dam complex on the Illinois River in Morris, Illinois. The dam was completed in 1933 and designed by engineer Walter Mickle Smith. It was listed on the National Register of Historic Places in 2004. The listing included one contributing building and three contributing structures.

The lock and dam complex includes an arched gravity dam, a spillway, nine Tainter gates, 18 headgates, and a section of fill dirt connecting the headgates to the embankment of the Illinois & Michigan Canal.

The lock and dam are 1,320 feet (400 m) long, and the lock has a maximum lift of 22 feet (6.7 m).

The state of Illinois began constructing the dam in 1928. In 1930, the state had completed 35% of the dam but lacked the money to complete it, so the federal government built the remainder of the dam.

The Dresden Island Lock and Dam is documented in a Historic American Engineering Record.
