= Buffalo Rock State Park =

State park in LaSalle County, Illinois

- Location within Illinois Location within the United States
- Location: LaSalle County, Illinois, United States
- Nearest city: Utica, Illinois
- Coordinates: 41°19′37″N 88°54′35″W
- Area: 298 acres (121 ha)
- Established: November 15, 1928
- Governing body: Illinois Department of Natural Resources

Buffalo Rock State Park & Effigy Tumuli is an Illinois state park on 298 acres (121 ha) in LaSalle County, Illinois, United States. The park sits across the Illinois River from Starved Rock State Park, just south of the Illinois and Michigan Canal trail. According to legend, it was once used as a "blind canyon" for Indians to capture buffalo. Effigy Tumuli, an art exhibit on the park property, consists of five earth art animal sculptures native to the Illinois River. It was constructed as a tribute to Native American tradition. The park is located 5 miles (8.0 km) east of Utica, Illinois (Starved Rock State Park), and approximately 85 miles (137 km) southwest of Chicago, Illinois. Its sandstone bluffs were carved by the Illinois River near the end of the Pleistocene epoch, and now serves as a State Park for local residents and tourists.

== History ==
The area of Buffalo Rock, the Village of La Vantum, was the home of the Illinois Indians when Louis Jolliet, the French explorer, and the Jesuit missionary priest Father Jacques Marquette made their trip up the Illinois River in 1673. In August of 1680 the Illinois Tribe was virtually annihilated in protracted warfare with the aggressive Haudenosaunee.

Buffalo Rock State Park served as an early military, trading, and missionary post for the French. During the winter of 1682–1683, LaSalle and Tonty built Fort St. Louis on Starved Rock, and gathered 4,000 Indian warriors at Buffalo Rock to form a confederation against the Haudenosaunee. The Miami, one of the tribes in the confederation, built their own fort on Buffalo Rock.

During the State Park's later years, it was used by a religious sect as a place for holding camp meetings, and was recently used for a tuberculosis sanatorium. In 1912, the Crane Company of Chicago purchased Buffalo Rock and maintained a sanatorium for employees and a summer vacation home for employees and family members. The company moved to a recreational park and donated the land in 1927 for Buffalo Rock to become a state park. On November 15, 1928, the deed of the property was turned over to the State of Illinois with provisions that it would become a permanent state park. As a reward for his loyal services, Robert Barnett, the 72-year-old caretaker, was retained to the land for the remainder of his life.

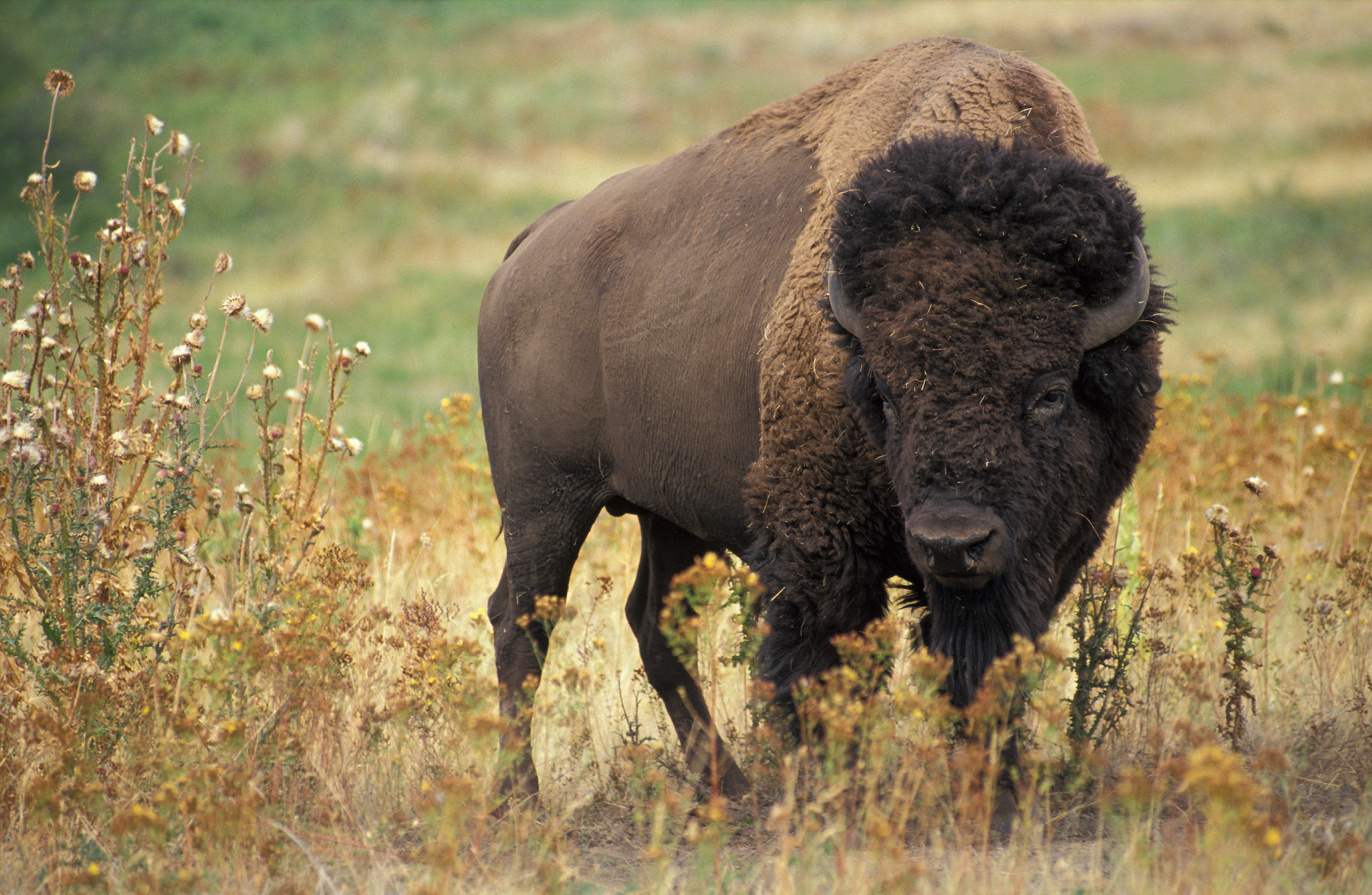
An American Bison Grazing

== Wildlife ==
Many animals can be seen and heard within the park, most prominently three American bison. Other animals that can be seen are the monarch butterfly, indigo bunting, tree swallow, Canada geese, red-backed salamander, water strider, American robin, blue jay, white-tailed deer, coyote, red fox, red cardinal, black-capped chickadee, pileated woodpecker, bald eagle, eastern gray squirrel, wild turkey, bobcat, and many others.

== Trails ==
The state park currently has two trails: the River Bluff Trail and the Woodland Trail. The River Bluff Trail runs above the Illinois River and has two observation decks that provide views of the river. The Woodland Trail runs deeper into the park, providing an opportunity for close-up viewing of trees, plants, and wildlife within the park.

== Camping ==
There are three primitive camping sites between Buffalo Rock and Utica, Illinois. A fire ring is provided at each campsite, but water and restroom facilities are not. The sites are accessible via biking or walking only - vehicles are not allowed. One of the three camping sites is dedicated to youth campers, where a shelter with a fireplace can be found. Prior to camping, permits must be obtained from Buffalo Rock State Park at the information center.

== Effigy Tumuli ==
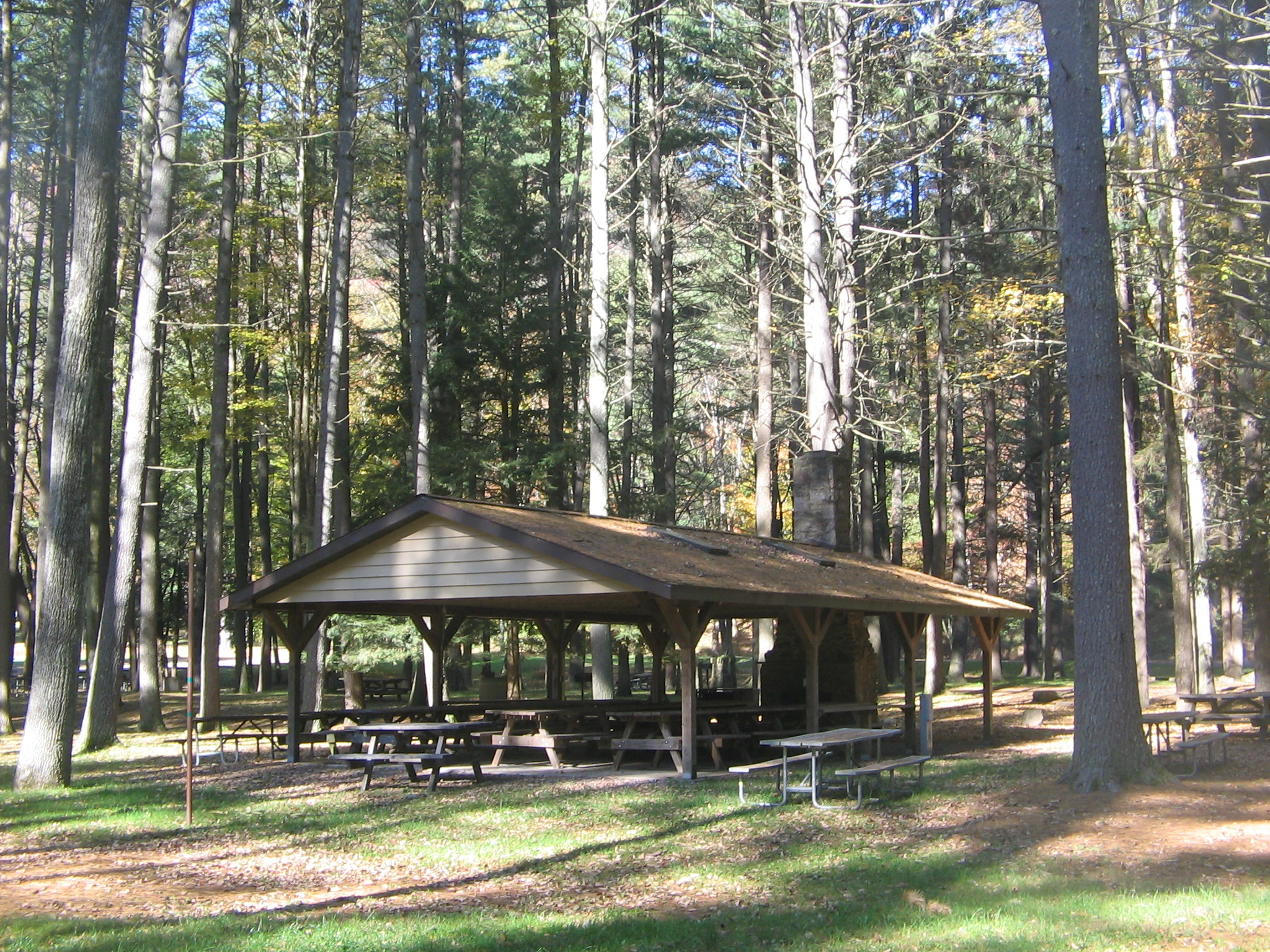
A picnic shelter with a stone fireplace

The Effigy Tumuli earthwork consists of five animal sculptures as tribute to ancient Native American tradition, mound building. The five animals that are depicted are a 685-foot-long (209 m) water strider, a 650-foot-long (200 m) turtle, a 770-foot-long (230 m) catfish, a 340-foot-long (100 m) frog, and a 2,070-foot-long (630 m) snake which is measured from head to toe. The water strider, catfish, and frog are built from mounds of dirt, grass, shrubbery, and exposed earth, while the turtle and snake use the geographic landscape to their advantage. The turtle's shell is formed as a mound with rock that dips into the river. The snake curves and dips down into the river 90 feet (27 m) down. Effigy Tumuli is one of the largest artworks in the country and must be seen from an aerial view in order to view the massive artworks. The site was owned by Ottawa Silica Company, who had an interest in art, and commissioned the sculptures to Michael Heizer in 1983 who used heavy equipment to finish the project two years later in 1985. Visitors can walk a trail through the site (which is 1.5 miles (2.4 km) long), and are invited to climb upon the artworks and read interpretive signs and maps to help visualize what they are viewing.

== Picnicking ==
Buffalo Rock State Park has two shelters dedicated for picnickers, or family and friends outings. Both shelters offer grills, picnic tables, water fountains available for drink, and restrooms located nearby. The larger of the two shelters comes complete with a stone fireplace and may be reserved, while the smaller shelter has a first-come, first-served basis. A playground is located near the larger shelter and a baseball diamond is located in the center of the park.
