= Marseilles Lock and Dam =

- Marseilles Lock and Dam Historic District
- U.S. National Register of Historic Places
- U.S. Historic district
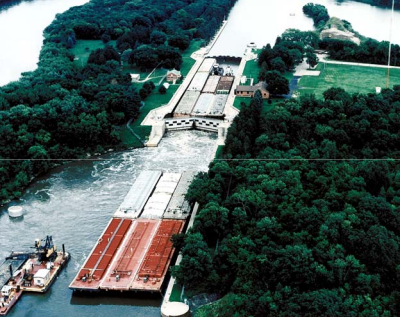

- Location within Illinois Location within the United States
- Nearest city: Marseilles, Illinois
- Coordinates: 41°19′43″N 88°45′10″W
- Area: 284.3 acres (115.1 ha)
- Built: 1920–33
- Architect: Smith, Walter Mickle
- Architectural style: Lock and Dam
- MPS: Illinois Waterway Navigation System Facilities MPS
- NRHP reference No.: 04000165
- Added to NRHP: March 10, 2004

The Marseilles Lock and Dam, also known as Lock and Dam 5, is a lock and dam complex on the Illinois River at Marseilles, Illinois. The complex includes a lock, dam, control station, boiler house, and a 2.5 miles (4.0 km) section of navigation canal. The state of Illinois began work on the complex in 1920 by digging the canal, which was completed in 1925. The state also began construction on the lock, dam, and control station; however, due to financial difficulties these projects were finished by the U.S. Army Corps of Engineers. Walter Mickle Smith was chief design engineer for the complex. The complex was completed in 1933. The lock has a drop of 24 feet (7.3 meters).

The lock and dam complex was listed on the National Register of Historic Places in 2004. The listing included two contributing buildings and three contributing structures.

On April 18, 2013, the uninspected towing vessel Dale A. Heller, pushing a tow of 14 barges, collided with the dam complex during a period of exceptionally high water flow. Seven barges impacted the dam itself, and four of these sank. Gates 2 and 3 were rendered inoperative and gates 4, 5, and 6 were damaged but remained operational. Damage to the gates contributed to flooding in the city of Marseilles. Repairs to the dam were estimated to cost forty to fifty million dollars.
