= Lockport Powerhouse =

- Lockport Lock, Dam and Power House Historic District
- U.S. National Register of Historic Places
- U.S. Historic district
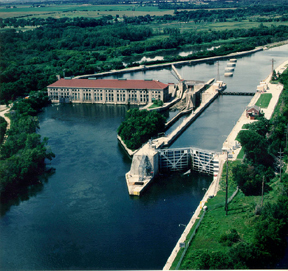
- Lockport Dam, Lock and Powerhouse

- Location within Illinois Location within the United States
- Interactive map showing the location of Lockport Powerhouse
- Nearest city: Lockport Township, near Lockport, Illinois
- Coordinates: 41°34′10″N 88°04′44″W
- Area: 44.2 acres (17.9 ha)
- Built: 1910
- Built by: Joseph J. Duffy, Lorimer & Gallacher Co (original lock); Green & Sons co (Navigation lock); Schmidt Brothers Construction Co (control station)
- Architect: Frederick L. Barrett (power house)
- Engineer: Isham Randolph (original lock); Walter M. Smith (control station), Illinois state engineers (Navigation lock); M.G. Barnes, Walter M. Smith, R.S. Heath, Fred Hendershot (Lockport)
- Architectural style: Renaissance
- MPS: Illinois Waterway Navigation System Facilities MPS
- NRHP reference No.: 04000167
- Added to NRHP: March 10, 2004

The Lockport Powerhouse is an American run-of-the-river dam used by the Metropolitan Water Reclamation District of Greater Chicago to control the outflow of the Sanitary and Ship Canal and limit the diversion of water from Lake Michigan into the Des Plaines River.

== History ==
The Chicago Sanitary and Ship Canal reached Lockport, Illinois in the 1890s. As part of this construction, a lock and dam was built in Lockport. Seven waste gates, used to control the level of water in the canal and Des Plaines River, were part of this project. From 1903 to 1907, the canal was extended from Lockport to Joliet. Construction on the Lockport Powerhouse began as part of this extension in 1905. Designed by Frederick L. Barrett, the red-roofed Beaux Arts powerhouse was constructed with concrete blocks coursed to resemble stone. The powerhouse featured four Francis turbines to generate electrical power, capable of generating 40,000 horsepower (30,000 kW). These turbines have since been replaced with two vertical Kaplan turbines. The powerhouse was also the home of the waste gate controls. The lock and gates were designed to manage a 40-foot (12 m) drop in canal elevation between the two municipalities.

A second phase of construction occurred from 1922 to 1933 to handle differing water loads following the opening of the Ohio River Standard Navigation Lock. First operational in 1907, the powerhouse is now recognized as the oldest hydroelectric plant in Illinois. The Lockport Lock, Dam and Power House Historic District was recognized by the National Park Service with a listing on the National Register of Historic Places on March 10, 2004.

== Navigation Lock ==
The lock next to the dam & powerhouse is largely used for barge traffic and has a 39 foot (11.8 meters) drop. It is the second of eight locks on the Illinois Waterway connecting Lake Michigan to the Mississippi River.
