= La Grange Lock and Dam =

- LaGrange Lock and Dam Historic District
- U.S. National Register of Historic Places
- U.S. Historic district
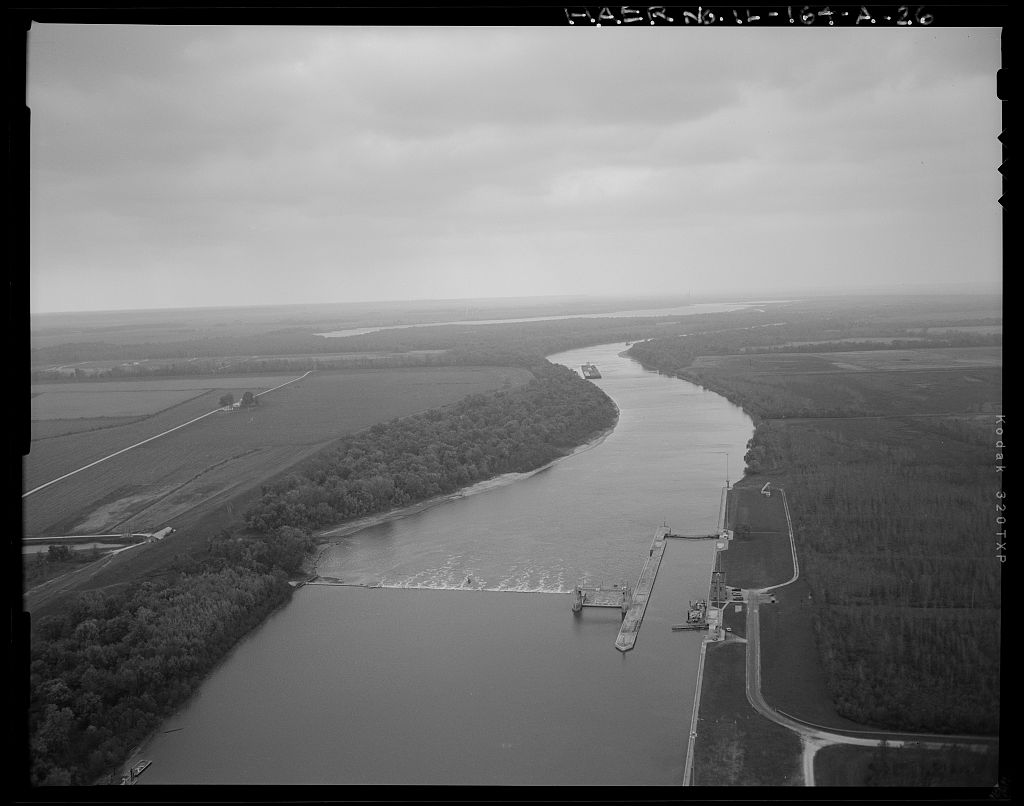
- Aerial view of the dam

- Location within Illinois Location within the United States
- Nearest city: Versailles, Illinois
- Coordinates: 39°56′27″N 90°32′02″W
- Area: 17.6 acres (7.1 ha)
- Built: 1939
- MPS: Illinois Waterway Navigation System Facilities MPS
- NRHP reference No.: 04000170
- Added to NRHP: March 10, 2004

LaGrange Lock and Dam is a lock and dam complex on the Illinois River at Versailles, Illinois. The structure includes a 1,066 feet (325 m) dam and a 110 by 600 feet (34 by 183 m) lock. The U.S. Army Corps of Engineers built the complex from 1936 to 1939; A.F. Griffin designed the lock and dam, while Paul Le Gromwell designed the control station. The lock and dam, as well as a similar lock and dam near Peoria, were needed when the authorized channel depth was raised to nine foot. The Peoria and LaGrange locks replaced older locks on the lower Illinois River. The lock uses Chanoine wicket gates, which allow for navigation on the river, rather than the Tainter gates seen elsewhere on the river.

The structure was added to the National Register of Historic Places on March 10, 2004.
