= National Register of Historic Places listings in LaSalle County, Illinois =

Location of LaSalle County in Illinois

This is a list of the National Register of Historic Places listings in LaSalle County, Illinois.

This is intended to be a complete list of the properties and districts on the National Register of Historic Places in LaSalle County, Illinois, United States. Latitude and longitude coordinates are provided for many National Register properties and districts; these locations may be seen together in a map.

There are 34 properties and districts listed on the National Register in the county, including three National Historic Landmarks.

This National Park Service list is complete through NPS recent listings posted August 21, 2026.

== Current listings ==
	Name on the Register	Image	Date listed	Location	City or town	Description
1	Armour's Warehouse	Armour's Warehouse	November 7, 1997 (#97001333)	Junction of William and Bridge Sts. 41°19′28″N 88°36′39″W	Seneca	
2	Chicago, Rock Island and Pacific Railroad Depot	Chicago, Rock Island and Pacific Railroad Depot	November 7, 1995 (#95001239)	150 Washington St. 41°19′44″N 88°42′21″W	Marseilles	
3	Corbin Farm Site	Corbin Farm Site	June 18, 1998 (#98000654)	Long Point, between Illinois Route 71 and the Illinois River; 41°18′37″N 88°56′21″W	Utica	
4	Fisher–Nash–Griggs House	Fisher–Nash–Griggs House	November 27, 1998 (#98001353)	1333 Ottawa Ave. 41°20′28″N 88°51′31″W	Ottawa	
5	Ruffin Drew Fletcher House	Ruffin Drew Fletcher House	August 5, 1991 (#91001000)	609 E. Broadway St. 41°07′35″N 88°49′40″W	Streator	
6	Hauge Lutheran Church	Hauge Lutheran Church	April 26, 2016 (#15000932)	3656 E. 2631st Rd. 41°27′54″N 88°39′56″W	Norway	
7	Julius W. Hegeler I House	Julius W. Hegeler I House	February 18, 2009 (#09000028)	1306 7th St. 41°20′07″N 89°05′17″W	LaSalle	
8	Hegeler–Carus Mansion	Hegeler–Carus Mansion	August 9, 1995 (#95000989)	1307 7th St. 41°20′09″N 89°05′13″W	LaSalle	
9	John Hossack House	John Hossack House	March 16, 1972 (#72000462)	210 W. Prospect St. 41°20′24″N 88°50′28″W	Ottawa	
10	Hotel Kaskaskia	Hotel Kaskaskia	November 3, 1988 (#88002229)	217 Marquette St.; also 629 2nd St. 41°19′46″N 89°05′45″W	LaSalle	Second set of boundaries represents a boundary increase of January 22, 2007, the Hotel Kaskaskia Buildings
11	Hotel Plaza Site	Hotel Plaza Site	June 18, 1998 (#98000656)	Northeast of the lodge at Starved Rock State Park; 41°19′11″N 88°59′34″W	Utica	
12	Illinois and Michigan Canal	Illinois and Michigan Canal	October 15, 1966 (#66000332)	7 miles (11 km) southwest of Joliet on U.S. Route 6, in Channahon State Park; 41°34′11″N 88°04′11″W	Joliet	
13	Knuessl Building	Knuessl Building	May 11, 1992 (#92000486)	215-217 W. Main; 41°20′46″N 88°50′35″W	Ottawa	
14	LaSalle City Building	LaSalle City Building	August 29, 1985 (#85001909)	745 2nd St. 41°19′46″N 89°05′41″W	LaSalle	
15	LaSalle Downtown Commercial District	LaSalle Downtown Commercial District	December 28, 2017 (#100001926)	400-800 & N side of 900 & 1000 blocks of 1st, 400-700 blocks of 2nd, & 100 & 200 blocks of Wright, Gooding, Marquette Sts. 41°19′43″N 89°05′49″W	LaSalle	
16	Little Beaver Site		June 18, 1998 (#98000655)	Starved Rock State Park, west of Illinois Route 178; 41°19′10″N 89°01′16″W	Utica	
17	Marseilles Hydro Plant	Marseilles Hydro Plant	May 9, 1989 (#89000343)	Commercial St. 41°19′37″N 88°42′55″W	Marseilles	
18	Marseilles Lock and Dam Historic District	Marseilles Lock and Dam Historic District	March 10, 2004 (#04000165)	1 Hawk Dr. 41°19′43″N 88°45′10″W	Marseilles	
19	Norway Temperance Hall		January 2, 2026 (#100012471)	E. 2631st Rd & N. 3650th Rd; 41°27′50″N 88°39′59″W	Sheridan	
20	Andrew J. O'Conor III House	Andrew J. O'Conor III House	April 22, 1993 (#93000324)	637 Chapel St. 41°20′55″N 88°49′45″W	Ottawa	
21	Old Kaskaskia Village	Old Kaskaskia Village	October 15, 1966 (#66000324)	Dee Bennett Rd. on the northern side of the Illinois River; 41°19′19″N 88°57′36″W	Ottawa	
22	Ottawa Commercial Historic District	Ottawa Commercial Historic District	November 22, 2011 (#11000850)	Roughly 600-1129 Columbus St. and 601-1215 LaSalle St. 41°21′03″N 88°50′31″W	Ottawa	
23	Ottawa East Side Historic District	Ottawa East Side Historic District	September 18, 2013 (#13000718)	Roughly between the Illinois & Fox Rivers, Shabbona & Green Sts. 41°20′49″N 88°49′55″W	Ottawa	
24	Ransom Water Tower	Ransom Water Tower	November 2, 1990 (#90001723)	Plumb St. between Cartier and Columbus; 41°09′24″N 88°38′57″W	Ransom	
25	Shaky Shelter Site	Shaky Shelter Site	June 18, 1998 (#98000657)	In a ravine south of Illinois Route 71 at Starved Rock State Park; 41°18′22″N 88°56′41″W	Utica	
26	Spring Valley House–Sulfur Springs Hotel	Spring Valley House–Sulfur Springs Hotel	November 20, 1987 (#87002055)	Dee Bennett Rd. 41°19′23″N 88°57′47″W	Utica	
27	Starved Rock	Starved Rock	October 15, 1966 (#66000325)	Starved Rock State Park; 41°19′14″N 88°59′26″W	Utica	
28	Starved Rock Lock and Dam Historic District	Starved Rock Lock and Dam Historic District	March 10, 2004 (#04000166)	Dee Bennett Rd. 41°19′25″N 88°58′36″W	Utica	
29	Starved Rock Lodge and Cabins	Starved Rock Lodge and Cabins	May 8, 1985 (#85002702)	Starved Rock State Park; 41°19′07″N 88°59′35″W	Utica	
30	Jeremiah Strawn House	Jeremiah Strawn House	January 24, 1995 (#94001601)	532 Congress St. 41°20′49″N 88°50′00″W	Ottawa	
31	Streator Public Library	Streator Public Library	May 2, 1996 (#96000512)	130 S. Park St. 41°07′10″N 88°50′04″W	Streator	
32	Washington Park Historic District	Washington Park Historic District	April 11, 1973 (#73000710)	Bounded by Jackson, LaSalle, Lafayette, and Columbus Sts. 41°20′57″N 88°50′30″W	Ottawa	
33	Westclox Manufacturing Plant Historic District	Westclox Manufacturing Plant Historic District	June 1, 2007 (#07000475)	300-315 5th St. 41°19′45″N 89°06′35″W	Peru	Partly destroyed by a fire on January 1, 2012
34	Silas Williams House	Silas Williams House	June 23, 1976 (#76002146)	702 E. Broadway; 41°07′29″N 88°49′32″W	Streator	

== See also ==
- List of National Historic Landmarks in Illinois
- National Register of Historic Places listings in Illinois
