= Heritage Restoration and Design Studio =

Interior restoration and renovation company located in Peoria, Illinois

Heritage Restoration and Design Studio Inc.
- Type: Private
- Industry: Construction
- Founded: August 1, 2004
- Headquarters: Peoria, Illinois
- Area served: United States
- Key people: Michael Berlinger, Kathryn Berlinger, Stephen Berlinger
- Services: Interior renovation, woodworks, glassworks, statuary carving
- Owner: Michael Berlinger
- Website: www.heritagerd.com

Heritage Restoration and Design Studios Inc., or Heritage Restoration, is a family-owned interior restoration and renovation company located in Peoria, Illinois.

== Background ==
Heritage Restoration has performed restorations in several United States historic or national landmarks, such as the woodwork in architect Frank Lloyd Wright's Unity Temple and the clock tower of the Livingston County Courthouse in Pontiac Illinois. The company has been owned by the Berlinger family for six generations.

== History ==
Heritage Restoration and Design originated in 1820 in Bavaria, Germany when Alois Berlinger formed a small stone carving and construction company called Steinhauer Berlinger. By the family's third generation Alois’ grandson, Edmund Berlinger, expanded the company by purchasing land that contained natural sandstone deposits. He then established a quarry and began mining resources that the company needed for its stone works. Edmund's tenure as head of the company saw Steinhauer Berlinger expand into the markets of interior plastering and whitewashing.

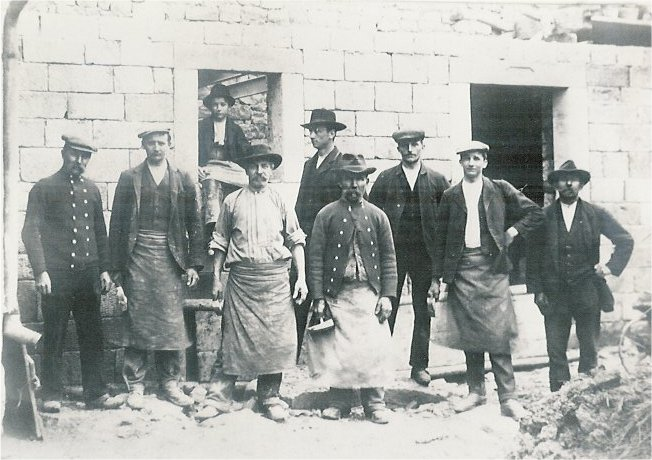
Berlinger family stone-workers constructing a building in Bavaria, Germany, 1820.

The Berliger family's fourth generation consisted of Edmund's three sons; Alois, Gustav and Herman. They added interior finishing and precast concreting into their company's brand. Alois married Helga Lehmeier who merged her family's woodworking and glassworking skills into the Steinhauer business. Alois and Helga decided to immigrate to the United States, as the economy of post-World War 2 Germany was not ideal for their new family. In 1965, Alois Helga and their two children, Michael and Willibald, set sail from Bremerhaven aboard the S.S. Berlin.

On June 19, 1965, Alois and his family arrived at Chicago where he started a small painting company. After a time, Alois decided to form the American branch of Steinhauer Berlinger. He named his new company the Berlinger Decorating Company. At the age of eight, Alois eldest son Michael became involved with the business, serving as both a translator and workman. The inclusion of Michael brought the fifth generation of Berlingers into the company. In the decade that followed, the Berlinger Decorating Company shifted its focus onto restoration work combined with woodworking, painting, and stonework expertise.

During the 1970s the company decided to move to Peoria, Illinois to set up a permanent base of operations. As the business became more settled in its new location, Michael Berlinger succeeded his father as head of the company. He shifted its focus further into historical restoration and preservation. In the early 2000s Berlinger Decorating Company rebranded as Heritage Restoration and Design Studios Inc. In the years that followed, Michael's four sons Stephen, Christopher, Joseph and Anthony joined the company, forming the sixth generation of Berlingers to inherit the business.

== Notable projects ==
- Natural History Building of the University of Illinois at Urbana–Champaign.
- Livingston County Courthouse in Pontiac, Illinois.
- Third District Appellate Courthouse in Ottawa, Illinois.
- Unity Temple in Chicago, Illinois.
- Reddick Mansion in Ottawa, Illinois.
- Dickeyville Grotto in Dickeyville, Wisconsin.
