= Ottawa Commercial Historic District =

- U.S. National Register of Historic Places
- U.S. Historic district
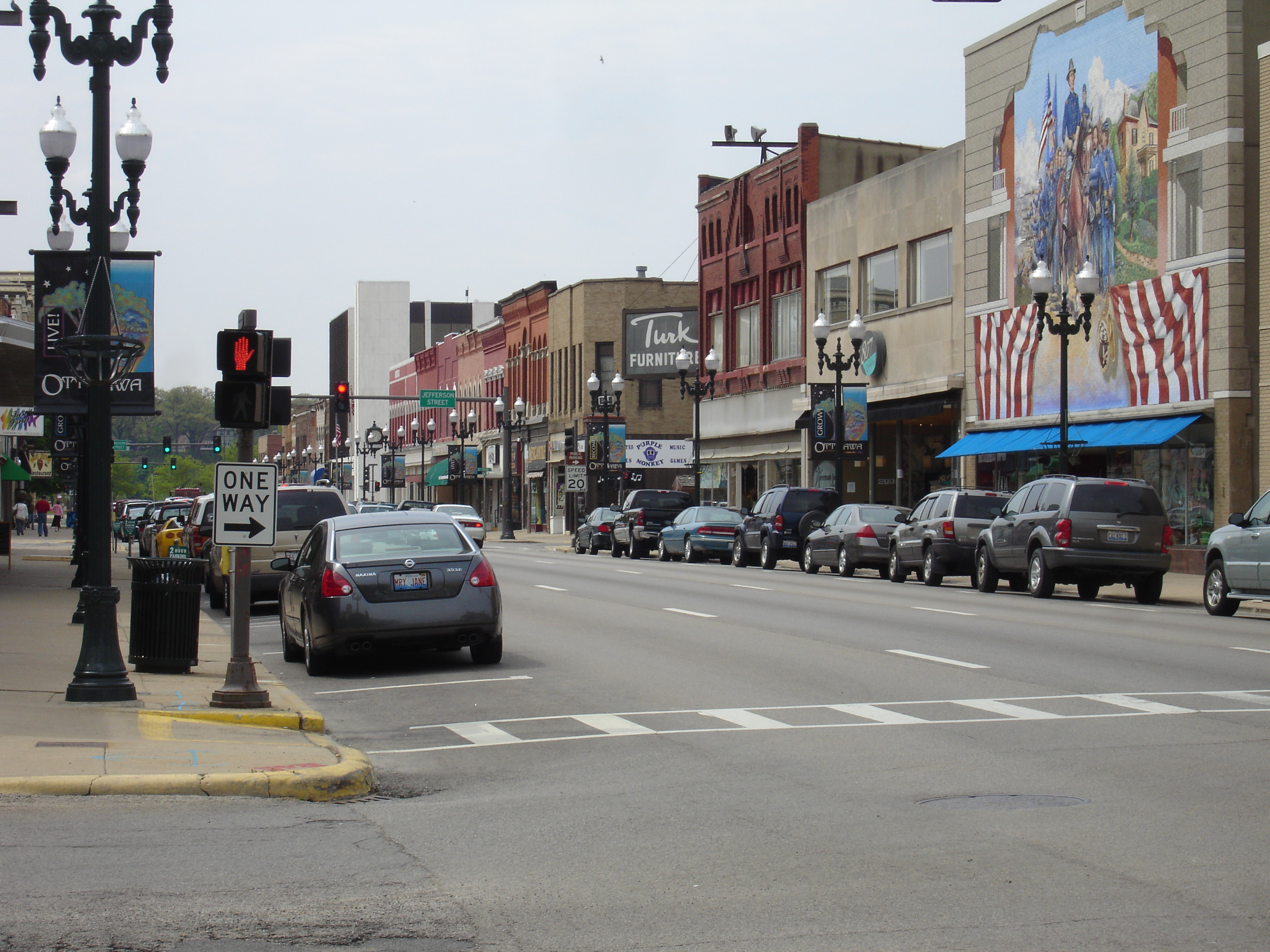

- Location within Illinois Location within the United States
- Location: Roughly 600-1129 Columbus St. and 601-1215 LaSalle St., Ottawa, Illinois
- Coordinates: 41°21′03″N 88°50′31″W
- NRHP reference No.: 11000850
- Added to NRHP: November 22, 2011

The Ottawa Commercial Historic District is a historic district in downtown Ottawa, Illinois. The district includes 195 buildings and structures, most of them commercial buildings, spread out over 26 city blocks. The oldest buildings in the district, located near the Illinois and Fox rivers, were built in the 1830s. The district expanded northward toward the Illinois & Michigan Canal over time, and the buildings in its northern half date to the mid-to-late 19th and early 20th centuries. The district's buildings include most popular Midwestern architectural styles from the mid-19th century through the mid-20th century; some of the most common are vernacular frame buildings from the early years of the district's growth, Italianate buildings from the mid-19th century, Commercial style buildings from the early 20th century, and International Style buildings from the mid-20th century.

The district was added to the National Register of Historic Places on November 22, 2011. Two sites within the district, the Washington Park Historic District and the Knuessl Building, are independently listed on the National Register.
