= William Reddick (politician) =

American politician (1812–1885)

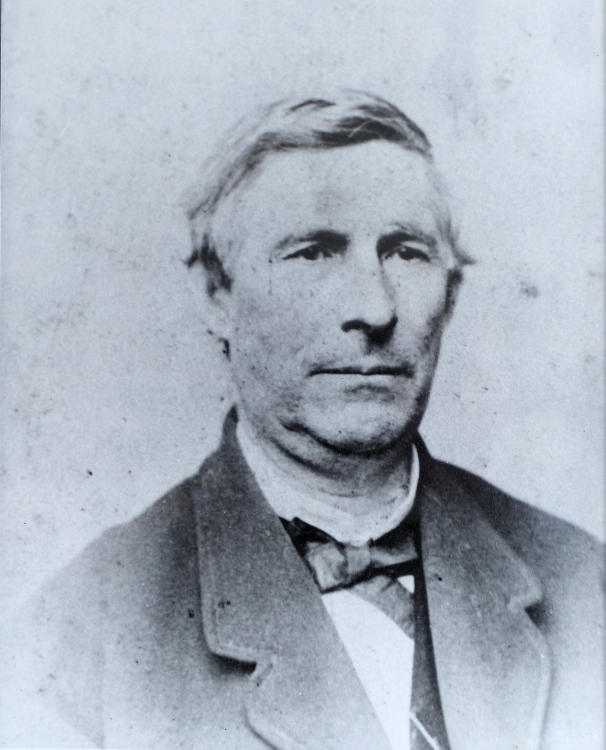
- Born: William Reddick; October 31, 1812; Ballynahinch, County Down, Ireland
- Died: March 8, 1885 (aged 72); Ottawa, Illinois, United States
- Occupations: Sheriff, state senator, businessman, farmer, landowner
- Known for: Real estate, education, philanthropy

William Reddick (October 31, 1812 – March 8, 1885) was an Irish-American businessman, farmer, lawman, politician, landowner and philanthropist. Immigrating to the United States with his family at the age of four, Reddick became one of the most prominent citizens of early Ottawa, Illinois. Having a lifelong interest in education, Reddick supported the foundation of the University of Illinois and assisted in the establishment of a public school system for the youth of Ottawa.

== Early life ==
Reddick was born in Ballynahinch, County Down, Ireland on October 31, 1812, to James and Bessie Reddick. His father and his family immigrated to New Jersey in 1816. Later that year the Reddicks moved to Zanesville, Ohio to seek work in the salt works. James Reddick died in 1821, survived by his wife and their five children.

== Apprenticeships and education ==
In 1825, aged fourteen, Reddick served an apprenticeship as a glass blower in Wheeling, West Virginia, earning $4.00 per month. Two years later, he relocated to Brownsville, Pennsylvania and became an indentured apprentice to William R. Campbell to blow window glass. This second apprenticeship concluded after a period of 2 years 2 months and 2 days. Aged 18, in 1830 Reddick married Eliza Jane Collins of Brownsville.

In 1832 the couple moved to Washington, D.C., Reddick continuing his trade as a glass blower. During this time he saved up $1000 U.S. dollars. While in Washington, Reddick devoted his free time to gaining an education by studying during both the evenings and during workplace break periods. By 1834, the Reddicks moved back to Brownsville. In 1835, using his savings, Reddick purchased 400 acres of land in Bruce Township, LaSalle County, Illinois intending to become a farmer.

== Political career ==
In 1838, the county seat of LaSalle, Ottawa, Illinois was experiencing civil unrest. Workmen hired to construct the nearby Illinois and Michigan Canal were described in historical documents as "a gang of troublemakers." The citizenry met to select a county sheriff to restore order. Washington Armstrong, a local political leader, proposed that William Reddick should take up the post, as Reddick was described as "big, powerful, and fearless."

After some initial reservations, Reddick accepted the offer and ran unopposed. After being elected by a majority vote, he and Eliza moved to Ottawa. Sworn statements made at the time suggest Reddick enjoyed popular support for his efforts as an honest and effective tax collector and law enforcer. He was reelected to the position of sheriff for four consecutive two-year terms. Reddick's time as sheriff ended when he was elected to the Illinois Senate in 1846. He held that office until 1852.

When he ran for the 1854 United States House of Representatives, Reddick lost by a margin of 147 votes. At this time the newly formed Republican Party in Illinois obtained the majority of the offices in the 1854 elections. Being a staunch Democrat, Reddick refused to join the new party and lost his political position. The 42-year-old Reddick would not hold another elected office for nearly two decades.

Reddick successfully ran for a final two-year term as a state senator in 1870. In 1872 Reddick pushed for a temperance law to limit the sale of liquor products in Illinois. The bill was passed and became known as "Reddick’s Temperance Law."

== Reddick Mansion ==
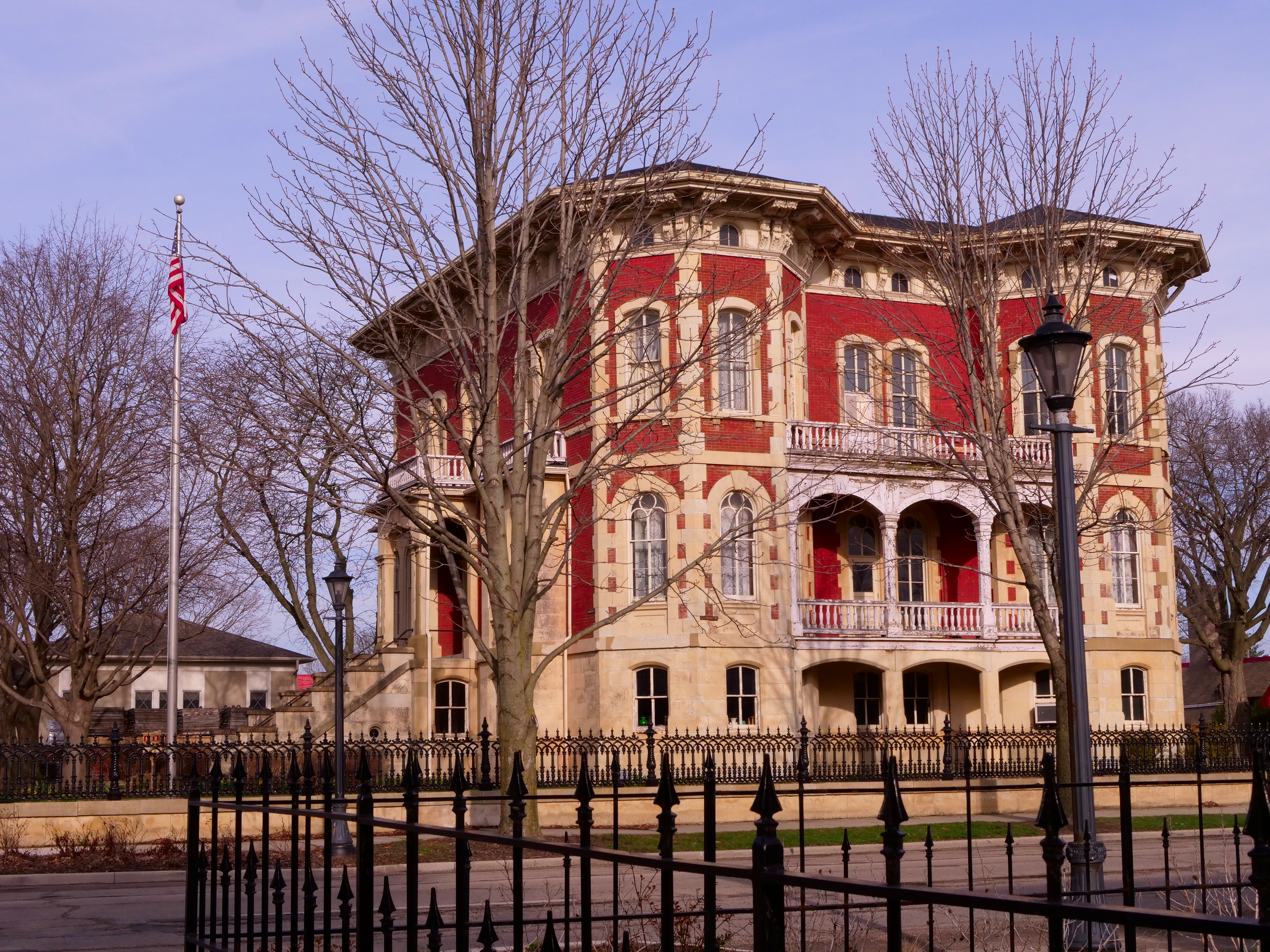
William Reddick's Mansion after it was converted from a public library into a private museum.

Having no children of their own, in 1852 the Reddicks adopted a child, Elizabeth Barrier Funk. In 1855 William Reddick hired architects William B. Olmstead and Peter A. Nicholson to build a large brick home in Ottawa Illinois. Construction occurred 1855–1858 at a cost of $25,000. The brick and stone mansion is in the Italianate style. The house was completed in time for guests to view the first of the Lincoln–Douglas debates from the mansion's steps and balconies on August 21, 1858. A lifelong Democrat, Reddick supported incumbent senator Stephen A. Douglas. During the first of the debates, Reddick sat next to Douglas on the speakers’ platform. Reddick Mansion is one of the largest surviving pre-Civil War homes in the state of Illinois. It is part of the Washington Park Historic District which was added to the National Register of Historic Places in 1973.

In April 2019, Heritage Restoration and Design Studio was hired to perform a large scale restoration of the mansion's exterior. Some $1,200,000 has been budgeted to restore the windows, facades, and Italianate cornices.

== Support for public education ==
Due to his own lack of formal schooling, Reddick dedicated time and money to ensuring that the citizens of Ottawa had access to education. In November 1851, William Reddick served as vice president of the Granville Convention of farmers. This meeting laid the foundation for the University of Illinois system. In 1854 Reddick served on a nine-man committee that planned a free public school system in Ottawa.

== Business ==
In 1854 Reddick opened a general goods store in Ottawa. In 1868 Hugh B.J. Gillen joined the firm as a partner. At the age of 60, Reddick sold his share in the store to Gillen and retired. The majority of William Reddick's fortune came from real estate holdings. He owned the land on which several large farms operated in LaSalle County. His other business ventures included the chartering of a hotel for Ottawa, the construction of toll bridges on the Fox and Illinois Rivers, and the founding of the Ottawa Glass Works. Reddick also assisted in the building and governance of the Kankakee Insane Asylum.

== Later life and death ==
By 1877, through his ownership of real estate and business ventures, Reddick's personal fortune was estimated at $300,000. Eliza Collins Reddick died on July 5, 1883, and Reddick himself died less than two years later on March 8, 1885. In his will, Reddick left the City of Ottawa his mansion for use as a public library and gave $100,000 for its upkeep. He also bequeathed one hundred acres of farm land to LaSalle County for the support of the poor.
