= Ransom, Illinois =

- Village
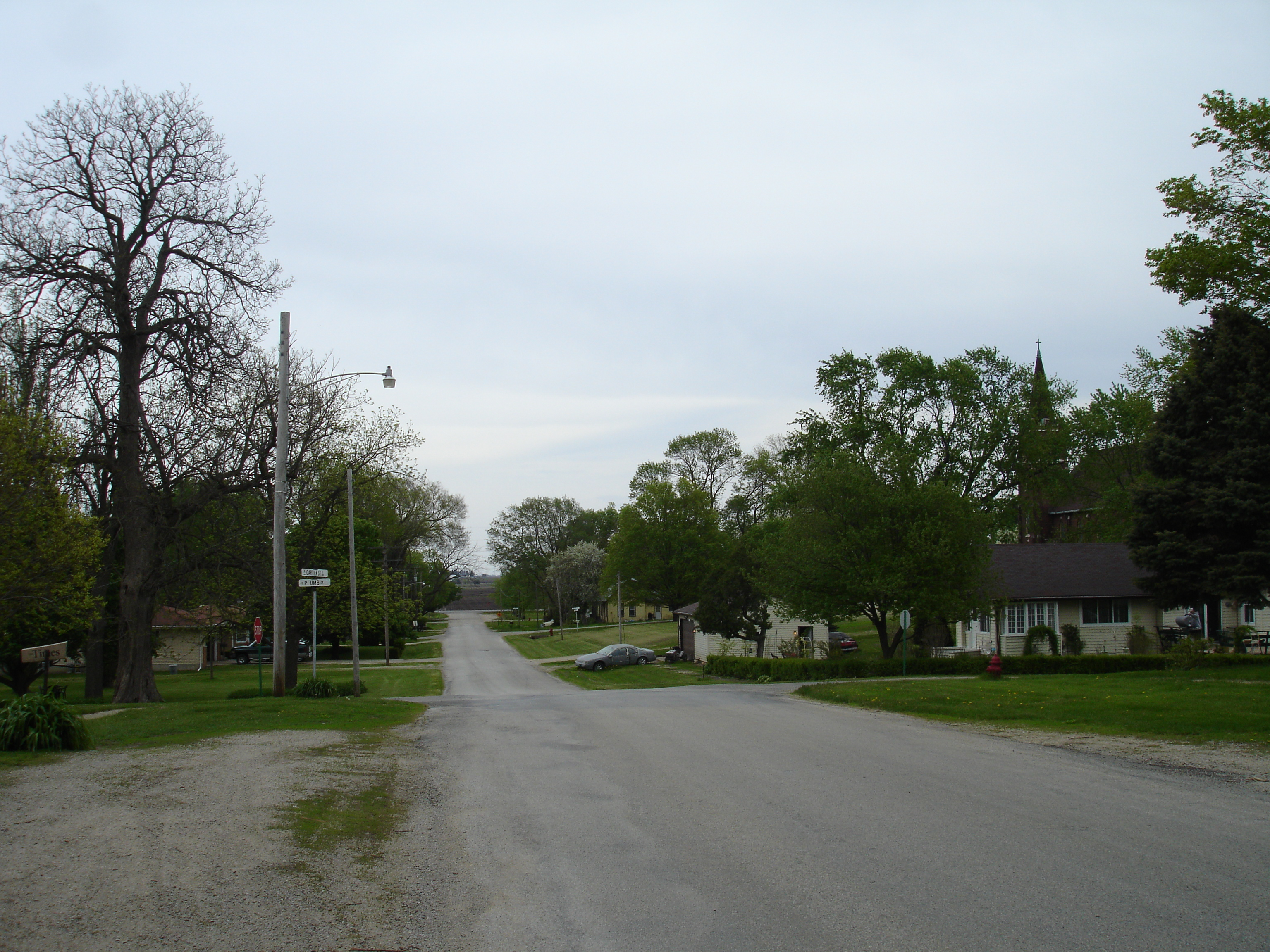
- Plumb Street in Ransom

- Location in LaSalle County, Illinois
- Coordinates: 41°09′31″N 88°39′15″W
- Country: United States
- State: Illinois
- County: LaSalle
- Township: Allen
- Founded: 1885

Area
  - Total: 1.00 sq mi (2.59 km^{2})
  - Land: 1.00 sq mi (2.59 km^{2})
  - Water: 0 sq mi (0.00 km^{2})
- Elevation: 705 ft (215 m)

Population (2020)
  - Total: 308
  - Density: 310/sq mi (119/km^{2})
- Time zone: UTC-6 (CST)
  - Summer (DST): UTC-5 (CDT)
- ZIP code: 60470
- Area code: 815
- FIPS code: 17-62757
- GNIS feature ID: 2399041
- Website: www.villageofransom.com

Ransom is a village in LaSalle County, Illinois, United States. The population was 308 at the 2020 census, down from 384 at the 2010 census. It is part of the Ottawa Micropolitan Statistical Area. It is part of the subregion known as Streatorland.

== History ==
Ransom was a planned community; ads were placed in the Streator Monitor as early as 1876 calling for shopkeepers, craftsmen, and tradesmen to locate and set up shop in the area. In 1885, the village of Ransom was officially incorporated. The earliest businesses in Ransom included a hotel, saloon, doctor, carpenter, pharmacist, grocery store, cash exchange and a blacksmith. On the edge of the newly developing business district a small wooden water tower was constructed. In 1892 a fire devastated the eastern side of the business district, stymieing the village's growth and causing some business owners to close up shop forever.

After the fire, and much back and forth, the village constructed a new public waterworks with a 68 feet water tower at its center in 1896. The village flourished after the fire, eventually reaching a population peak of around 600 following World War II. On September 7, 1903, the first phone service reached Ransom, and AT&T opened a telegraph office in 1905. Between 1905 and 1910 the village constructed a sidewalk system. The first electric street lamps appeared on May 7, 1910, with the acquisition of a dozen electric street lamps from Illinois Valley Gas and Electric. Electricity gradually made its way into the homes of Ransom following the introduction of the street lamps.

=== Namesake ===
The village was named for American Civil War general Thomas E. G. Ransom, who was born in Vermont but lived as a young man in Illinois.

== Geography ==
Ransom is located in southeastern LaSalle County at the center of Allen Township. Illinois Route 170 runs along the eastern border of the village, leading north 13 miles (21 km) to Seneca along the Illinois River, and south 20 miles (32 km) to Pontiac.

According to the 2021 census gazetteer files, Ransom has a total area of 1.00 square mile (2.59 km^{2}), all land.

== Demographics ==
Historical population
Census	Pop.	Note	%±
1880	132		—
1890	338		156.1%
1900	339		0.3%
1910	370		9.1%
1920	402		8.6%
1930	456		13.4%
1940	419		−8.1%
1950	411		−1.9%
1960	415		1.0%
1970	440		6.0%
1980	456		3.6%
1990	438		−3.9%
2000	409		−6.6%
2010	384		−6.1%
2020	308		−19.8%
U.S. Decennial Census

As of the 2020 census there were 308 people, 156 households, and 99 families residing in the village. The population density was 308.31 inhabitants per square mile (119.04/km^{2}). There were 153 housing units at an average density of 153.15 per square mile (59.13/km^{2}). The racial makeup of the village was 90.58% White, 1.30% African American, 0.65% Asian, 0.65% from other races, and 6.82% from two or more races. Hispanic or Latino of any race were 5.84% of the population.

There were 156 households, out of which 37.8% had children under the age of 18 living with them, 38.46% were married couples living together, 15.38% had a female householder with no husband present, and 36.54% were non-families. 27.56% of all households were made up of individuals, and 10.90% had someone living alone who was 65 years of age or older. The average household size was 2.78 and the average family size was 2.28.

The village's age distribution consisted of 27.0% under the age of 18, 4.8% from 18 to 24, 27.4% from 25 to 44, 31% from 45 to 64, and 9.9% who were 65 years of age or older. The median age was 38.1 years. For every 100 females, there were 108.8 males. For every 100 females age 18 and over, there were 96.2 males.

The median income for a household in the village was $63,750, and the median income for a family was $75,313. Males had a median income of $56,250 versus $28,036 for females. The per capita income for the village was $30,877. About 22.2% of families and 15.5% of the population were below the poverty line, including 25.0% of those under age 18 and 8.6% of those age 65 or over.
