= Hotel Kaskaskia =

Historic building in LaSalle, Illinois, US

- U.S. National Register of Historic Places
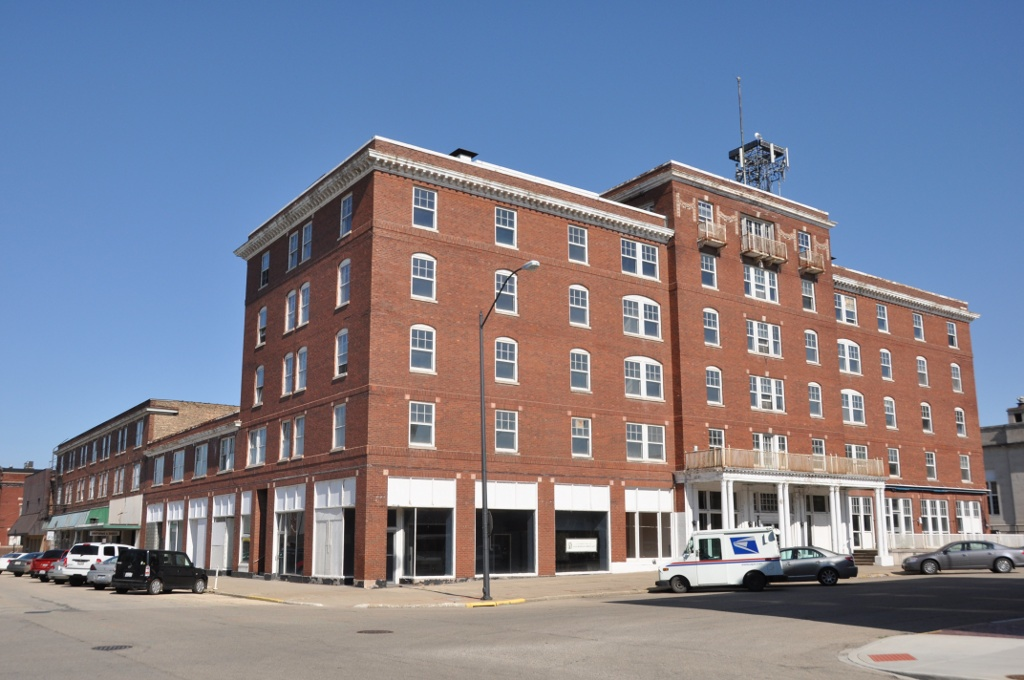
- Hotel Kaskaskia

- Location within Illinois Location within the United States
- Location: 217 Marquette Street; LaSalle, Illinois
- Coordinates: 41°19′46″N 89°5′45″W
- Area: less than one acre
- Built: 1915
- Architect: Marshall & Fox
- Architectural style: Colonial Revival
- NRHP reference No.: 88002229
- Added to NRHP: November 3, 1988

Hotel Kaskaskia is a historic building in LaSalle, Illinois. The hotel was designed by Marshall and Fox and named for the Kaskaskia Indian Village. The six-story hotel at 217 Marquette Street opened in 1915. It is listed on the National Register of Historic Places. The hotel hosted WJBC (AM).

Some guests arrived via the Rock Island "Rocket" train from Chicago. Celebrity guests included Amelia Earhart, Spike Jones & His City Slickers, Galli Curoi, and Admiral Chester W. Nimitz.

The building was closed up in 2001. It also appears to have been used an independent living facility. As of 2010 it was being restored as a hotel, museum and convention center.

== See also ==
- National Register of Historic Places listings in LaSalle County, Illinois
- Starved Rock State Park
