= Allen Township, Illinois =

Township in Illinois, US

Allen Township
- Township
- Location in LaSalle County

- LaSalle County's location in Illinois
- Coordinates: 41°09′16″N 88°38′42″W
- Country: United States
- State: Illinois
- County: LaSalle
- Established: November 6, 1849

Area
  - Total: 36.23 sq mi (93.8 km^{2})
  - Land: 36.23 sq mi (93.8 km^{2})
  - Water: 0 sq mi (0 km^{2}) 0%
- Elevation: 692 ft (211 m)

Population (2020)
  - Total: 531
  - Density: 16.1/sq mi (6.2/km^{2})
- Time zone: UTC-6 (CST)
  - Summer (DST): UTC-5 (CDT)
- ZIP codes: 60437, 60470, 61364
- FIPS code: 17-099-00763

Allen Township is one of thirty-seven townships in LaSalle County, Illinois, USA. As of the 2020 census, its population was 531 and it contained 245 housing units. Allen Township was formed from Bruce Township on an unknown date. The township bears the name of Allen Stevens, a pioneer settler.

== Geography ==
According to the 2021 census gazetteer files, Allen Township has a total area of 36.23 square miles (93.84 km^{2}), all land.

=== Cities, towns, villages ===
- Ransom

=== Cemeteries ===
The township contains these two cemeteries: Allen and Saint Patrick's Catholic.

== Demographics ==
As of the 2020 census there were 531 people, 219 households, and 145 families residing in the township. The population density was 14.66 inhabitants per square mile (5.66/km^{2}). There were 245 housing units at an average density of 6.76 per square mile (2.61/km^{2}). The racial makeup of the township was 92.47% White, 0.75% African American, 0.00% Native American, 0.38% Asian, 0.00% Pacific Islander, 0.38% from other races, and 6.03% from two or more races. Hispanic or Latino of any race were 4.14% of the population.

There were 219 households, out of which 29.70% had children under the age of 18 living with them, 43.84% were married couples living together, 15.53% had a female householder with no spouse present, and 33.79% were non-families. 26.50% of all households were made up of individuals, and 13.70% had someone living alone who was 65 years of age or older. The average household size was 2.16 and the average family size was 2.57.

The township's age distribution consisted of 20.7% under the age of 18, 3.6% from 18 to 24, 26.6% from 25 to 44, 33.9% from 45 to 64, and 15.2% who were 65 years of age or older. The median age was 43.9 years. For every 100 females, there were 114.0 males. For every 100 females age 18 and over, there were 104.9 males.

The median income for a household in the township was $75,938, and the median income for a family was $83,750. Males had a median income of $55,208 versus $33,750 for females. The per capita income for the township was $36,943. About 16.6% of families and 13.1% of the population were below the poverty line, including 24.5% of those under age 18 and 6.9% of those age 65 or over.

Historical population
Census	Pop.	Note	%±
2020	531		—
U.S. Decennial Census

== Political districts ==
- Illinois's 11th congressional district
- State House District 75
- State Senate District 38
