= Jeremiah Strawn House =

Historic house in Illinois, United States

- U.S. National Register of Historic Places
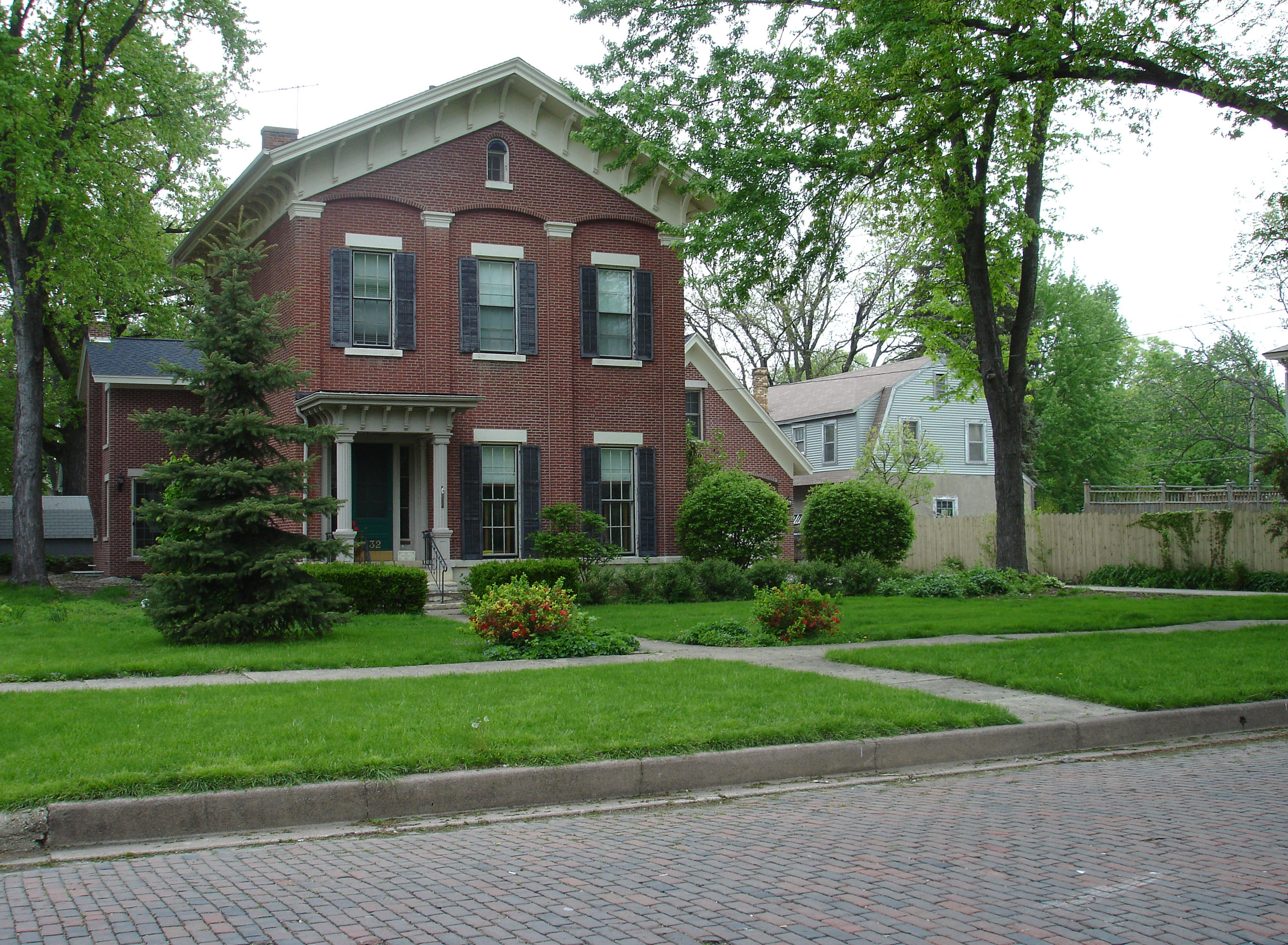

- Location within Illinois Location within the United States
- Location: 532 Congress St., Ottawa, Illinois
- Coordinates: 41°20′49″N 88°50′0″W
- Area: less than one acre
- Built: c. 1855–70
- Architectural style: Front-gable, Italianate
- NRHP reference No.: 94001601
- Added to NRHP: January 24, 1995

The Jeremiah Strawn House is a historic house in the city of Ottawa, Illinois. It is a good example of a front-gabled house with Italianate detailing. The Strawn House was added to the U.S. National Register of Historic Places in 1995.

== History ==
The Jeremiah Strawn House in Ottawa, Illinois was built in three phases from around 1855–70 for property owner Jeremiah Strawn. Strawn purchased the property in 1857 from William Osman for US$4,000.

== Architecture ==
The Strawn House is a high-integrity example of the front-gable architectural design, also known as Mid 19th Century Design. Essentially this style of American residential design was loosely based upon Greek and Roman models. Large-scale American sympathy for the Greek War of Independence, archaeological investigations and the proliferation of design models in publications all helped spread this style. The Strawn House features Italianate detailing such as the brackets beneath the eaves. Though the Strawn House was constructed at the height of popularity for Greek Revival style it still maintains many elements of the earlier Classical Revival period.

== Historic significance ==
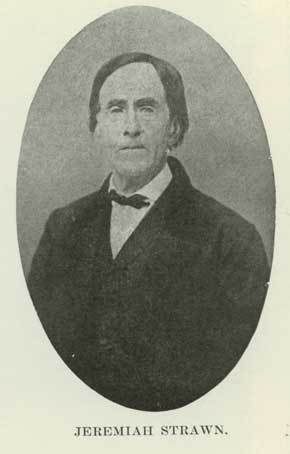
A pre-1903 image of Jeremiah Strawn.

The Strawn House is a good example of a front-gabled house. The house is architecturally significant as the only example of such design in Ottawa, with most others falling into the Italianate or Greek Revival categories. The Jeremiah Strawn House was added to the U.S. National Register of Historic Places on January 24, 1995.
