= Ottawa East Side Historic District =

- U.S. National Register of Historic Places
- U.S. Historic district
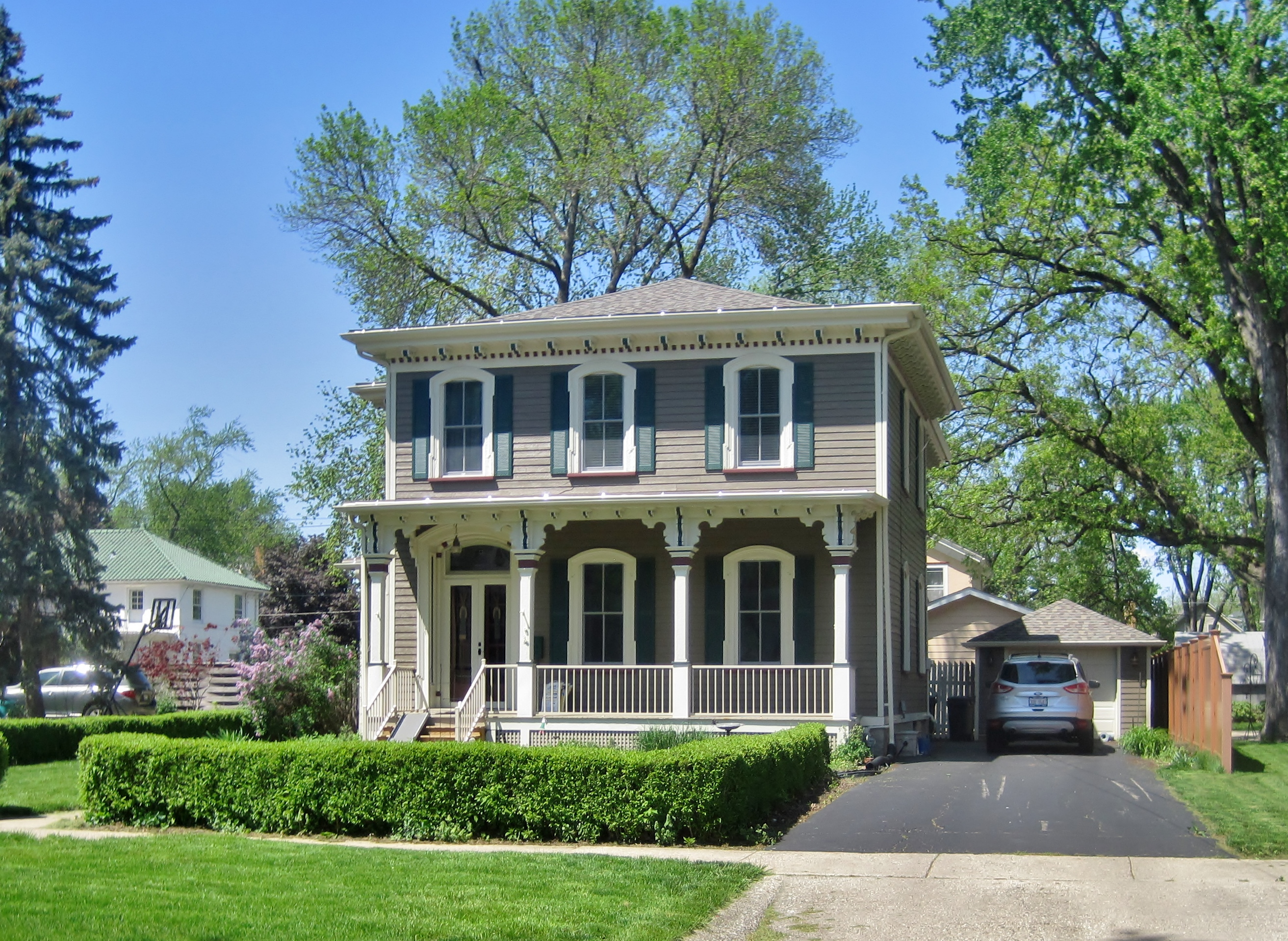

- Location within Illinois Location within the United States
- Location: Roughly between the Illinois & Fox Rivers, Shabbona & Green Sts., Ottawa, Illinois
- Coordinates: 41°20′49″N 88°49′55″W
- NRHP reference No.: 13000718
- Added to NRHP: September 18, 2013

The Ottawa East Side Historic District is a residential historic district in eastern Ottawa, Illinois. The district is located on a peninsula formed by the confluence of the Fox River and Illinois River and is only connected to the rest of Ottawa by a single bridge. The area's relative isolation caused the city's businesses and industries to avoid building there, and as a result the district became almost entirely residential. Construction in the East Side began in 1848, when developer Henry Green built his home there, and continued rapidly through the 19th century; after a brief slowdown at the turn of the century, development continued in the 1910s and 1920s before stopping almost entirely during the Great Depression. The neighborhood was one of the most desirable in the city, and Ottawa's upper class built many large homes there; however, it also includes several smaller middle-class houses. The Greek Revival, Italianate, and Queen Anne styles are all well-represented in the district's larger and more formal homes, while many vernacular styles can be seen in the smaller homes.

The district was added to the National Register of Historic Places on September 18, 2013.
