= Andrew J. O'Conor III House =

Historic house in Illinois, United States

- U.S. National Register of Historic Places
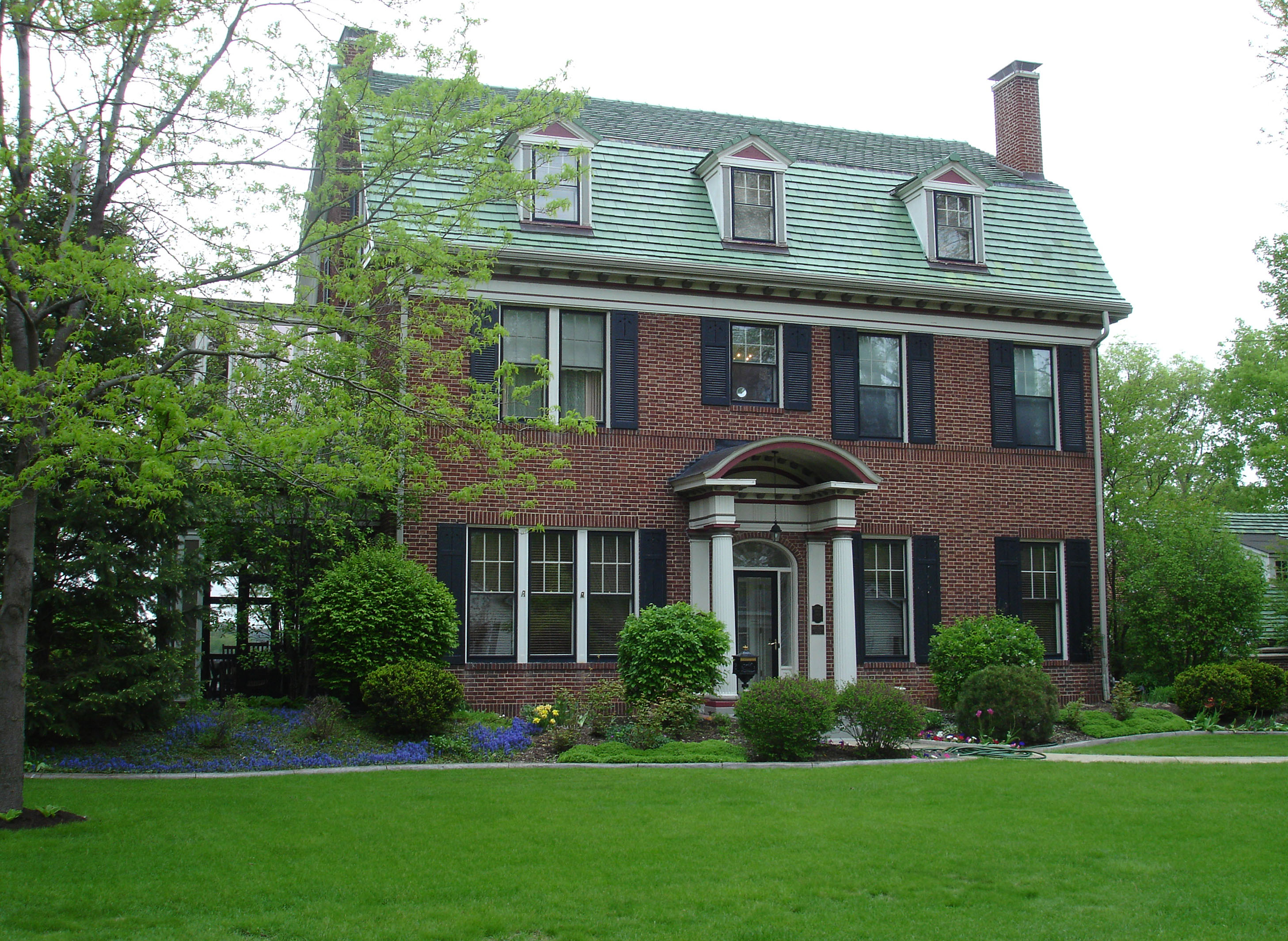

- Location within Illinois Location within the United States
- Location: 736 Chapel St., Ottawa, Illinois
- Coordinates: 41°20′55″N 88°49′45″W
- Area: less than one acre
- Built: 1848; 1922
- Architect: Norman Cook
- Architectural style: Colonial Revival
- NRHP reference No.: 93000324
- Added to NRHP: April 22, 1993

The Andrew J. O'Conor III House, also referred to as Riverbend and Buena Vista, is a historic home in the city of Ottawa, Illinois, United States. The structure that exists today was originally constructed in 1848 and underwent a major remodeling in 1922. The house was added to the U.S. National Register of Historic Places in 1993.

== History ==
The original house at the site was constructed sometime in the early 1840s by Henry Green, a New Hampshire native who settled in Ottawa around 1834. While Green had built three different homes on the site, the Italianate mansion he completed by 1848 is the only structure that still exists. Henry Green sold this Italianate mansion to William H.W. Cushman in 1848. Cushman named the home "Buena Vista," and lived there with his family until he sold it to N.B. Bristol in 1869. The property changed hands several times, and passed under the ownership of Oliver Cromwell Gray, Hiram Thornton Gilbert, James W. Duncan, and Martha L. Buell. Ottawa attorney Andrew J. O'Conor III bought the house and property in 1920. The O'Conor's, who renamed the home "Riverbend," completed an extensive renovation of the home in 1923. The result was a 5,100-square-foot (470 m^{2}) house surrounded by a spacious yard with a commanding view of the Fox River.

== Architecture ==
The O'Conor House was designed by native Ottawan Norman Cook, a lifelong friend of the O'Conor family who designed several other significant buildings in LaSalle County. The Colonial Revival O'Conor House has in its windows, cornices and entrances the principal areas of Colonial Revival style.

== Historic significance ==
The Andrew J. O'Conor was added to the U.S. National Register of Historic Places on April 22, 1993. It is most significant for its architecture, which is one of the best remaining examples of the colonial revival style in the area. Several of its previous owners have served in the Illinois General Assembly. While there are many anecdotes and stories about President Abraham Lincoln visiting the home on several occasions when he was in Ottawa throughout his life, including appearances in Ottawa before the Illinois State Supreme Court in June 1851 and December 1852, so far there is no definitive documentary evidence that proves Abraham Lincoln visited or stayed in the home, but there is a strong likelihood. Ottawa businessman William H.W. Cushman and his third wife, Anna Caesaria Rodney, lived in the home from 1848 until it was sold in 1869. Rodney, the daughter of U.S. Attorney General Caesar Augustus Rodney and granddaughter of Thomas Rodney, was well connected to the prominent political figures and families of the United States throughout the 19th Century, including Mary Todd and her future husband, Abraham Lincoln. Prior to her 1843 marriage to Cushman, Rodney was one of three bridesmaids to Mary Todd Lincoln in her wedding to Abraham Lincoln in Springfield, Illinois on November 4, 1842.
