= LaSalle Downtown Commercial District =

Historic district in Illinois, United States

- U.S. National Register of Historic Places
- U.S. Historic district
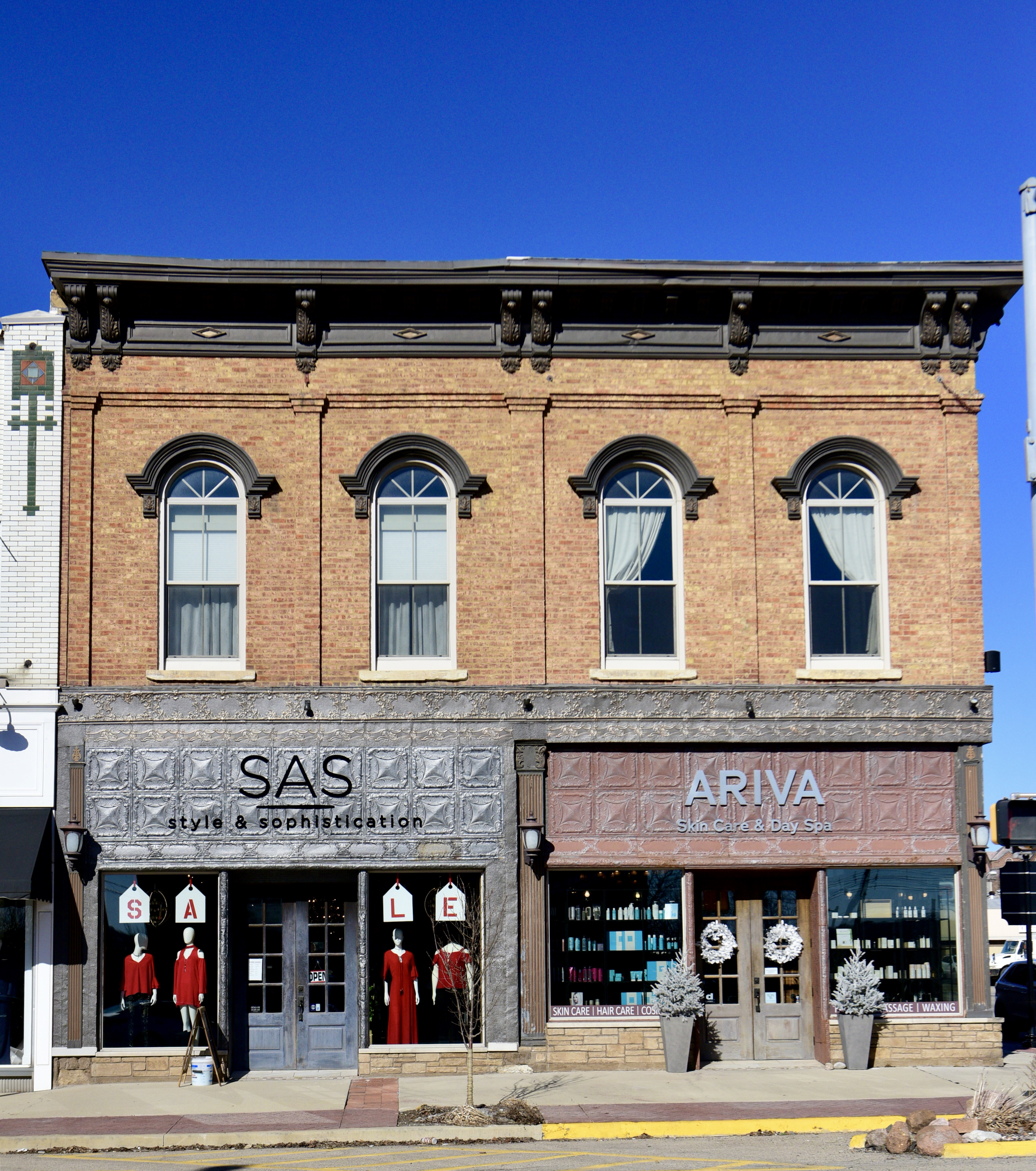

- Location within Illinois Location within the United States
- Location: 400-800 & N side of 900 & 1000 blocks of 1st, 400-700 blocks of 2nd, & 100 & 200 blocks of Wright, Gooding, Marquette Sts., LaSalle, Illinois
- Coordinates: 41°19′43″N 89°05′49″W
- NRHP reference No.: 100001926
- Added to NRHP: December 28, 2017

The LaSalle Downtown Commercial District is a national historic district in downtown LaSalle, Illinois. The district encompasses 93 contributing buildings which historically formed the commercial and governmental center of LaSalle. Development in downtown LaSalle began with the completion of the Illinois and Michigan Canal in 1837 and the construction of railroads through the city in the 1850s; it continued through the mid-twentieth century. The district's commercial buildings represent many architectural styles, with popular styles of the late nineteenth century such as Italianate, Queen Anne, and Romanesque Revival being the most common. Significant government buildings include the LaSalle City Building and two post office buildings.

The district was added to the National Register of Historic Places on December 28, 2017.
