= Ransom Water Tower =

- U.S. National Register of Historic Places
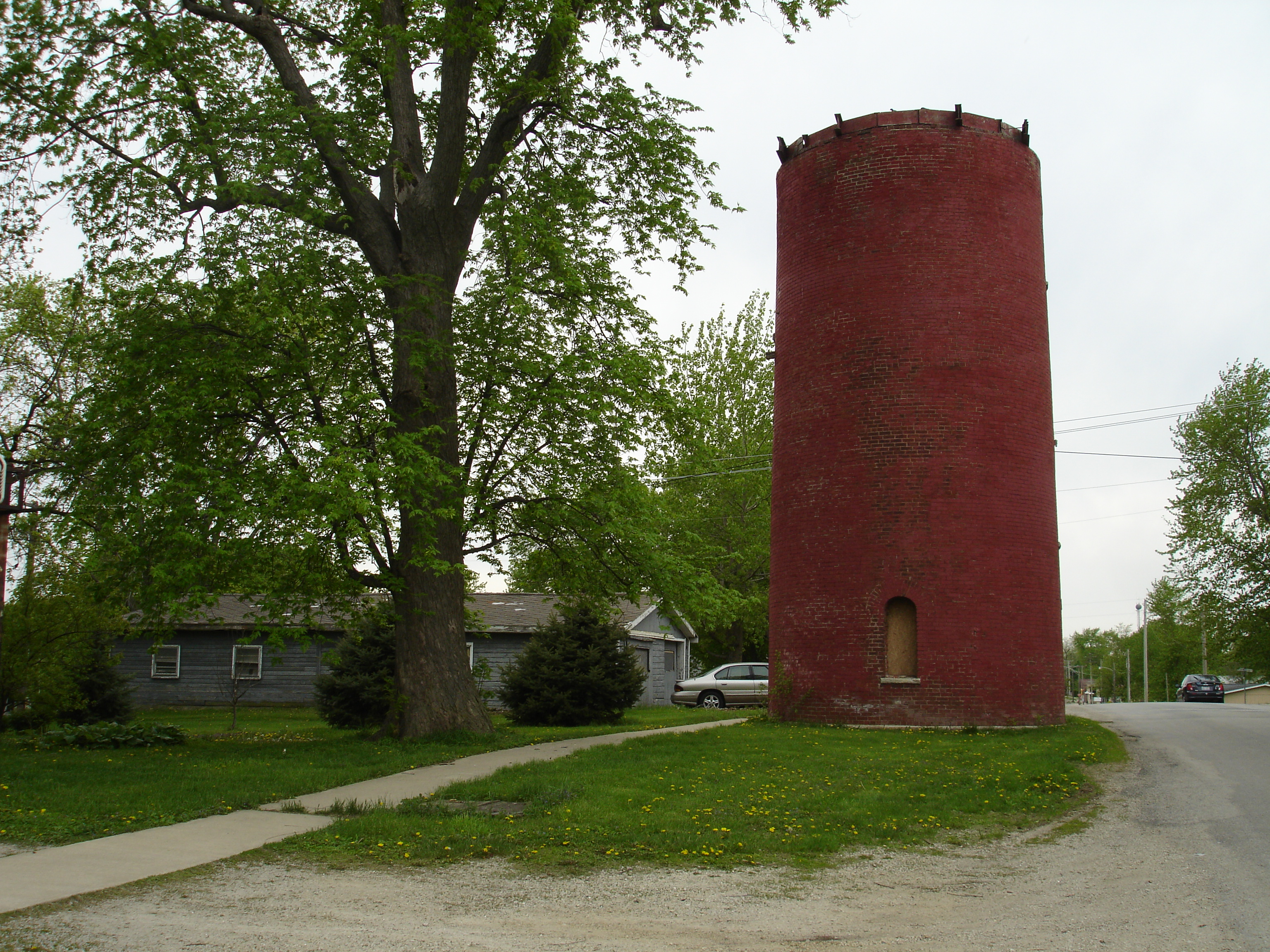

- Location within Illinois Location within the United States
- Location: Plumb St. between Cartier and Columbus, Ransom, Illinois
- Coordinates: 41°9′24″N 88°38′57″W
- Area: less than one acre
- Built: 1896
- Architectural style: Barrel-type water tower
- NRHP reference No.: 90001723
- Added to NRHP: November 2, 1990

The Ransom Water Tower is a former water tower in the LaSalle County, Illinois, village of Ransom. It was added to the U.S. National Register of Historic Places in 1990. It was demolished in January 2025.

== History ==
After a fire in the early 1890s the village of Ransom decided to construct a public waterworks with a central water tower. The first meetings were held in 1893 and 1894. After some controversy over the size of the tank and tower a 45,000–50,000 gallon tank was constructed atop a brick water tower in 1896. The tower served the village from its construction until July 19, 1990. In January 2025, the Village of Ransom demolished the water tower over concerns of safety.

== Design ==
The Ransom Water Tower is located atop a hill, what was the highest point in the then-center of town. Upon its construction, a 40 foot brick tower was topped with a 28-foot-tall (8.5 m) wooden water tank. The brick tower is a round, "barrel", tower. At its base it has a diameter of 29 feet 4 inches which tapers as the tower rises to a diameter of about 24 feet.

== Historic significance ==
The tower is locally significant to the settlement of Ransom. It helped the village flourish after a devastating fire and attracted settlers and business growth to Ransom. The Ransom Water Tower was added to the U.S. National Register of Historic Places on November 2, 1990.
