= Knuessl Building =

Commercial building in Illinois, US

- U.S. National Register of Historic Places
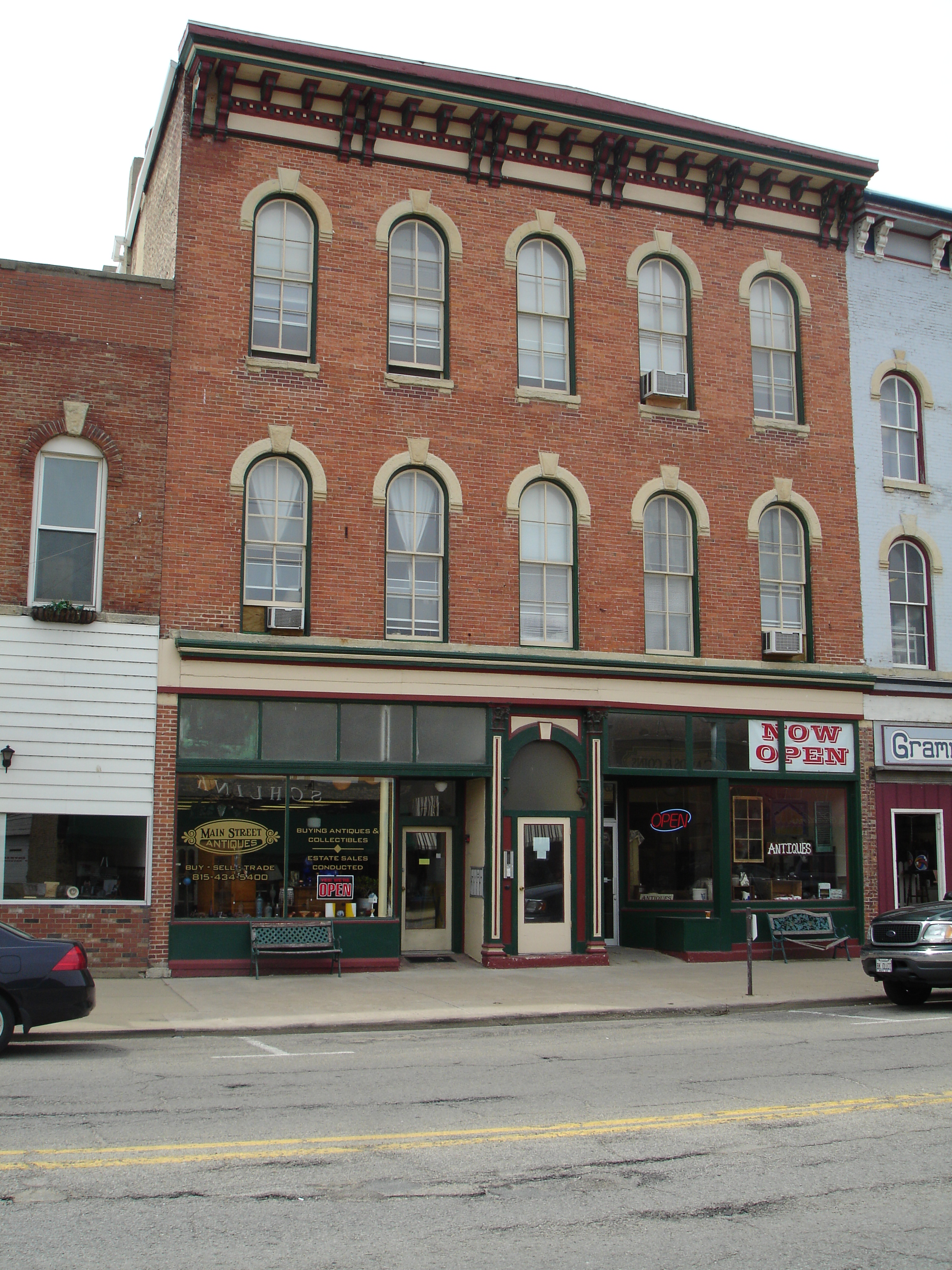

- Location within Illinois Location within the United States
- Location: 215-217 W. Main, Ottawa, Illinois
- Coordinates: 41°20′46″N 88°50′35″W
- Area: less than one acre
- Built: c. 1868
- Architectural style: Italianate
- NRHP reference No.: 92000486
- Added to NRHP: May 11, 1992

The Knuessl Building is a historic mid-19th Century commercial building in downtown Ottawa, Illinois. It was built around 1868 by a local pharmacist. The Knuessl Building was added to the U.S. National Register of Historic Places in 1992.

== History ==
The Knuessl Building was built for Maxmillion Knuessl, a German-born Ottawan who came to the city in 1855. Knuessl was a trained druggist. The building served as his drugstore until his children later moved it in 1895, a few years after their father's death. The Knuessl Brothers Drug Store was in business into the 1940s. The structure has had many other uses through the years, including housing other businesses, churches, and storage.

== Architecture ==
The Knuessl Building is 34 feet (10 m) wide by 80 feet (24 m) long and stands 54 feet (16 m) tall. It is the most prominent structure in a block of commercial buildings along West Main Street in Ottawa. The front elevation is divided by a center staircase leading to the upper floors and creating two storefronts. In 1912 the building underwent some alterations which moved the storefront entrances from centered, to either side, creating a single, large display area for each storefront. The Knuessl Building is an example of the transition from wood-framed building construction to masonry construction in the 1860s. The building represents a mid-19th century commercial building design meant to evoke the Italian Renaissance known as Italianate.

== Historic significance ==
The Knuessl Building and the building adjacent it are the only two in the commercial block that retain much of their front facade details and ornamentation, especially their cornices, arched windows and storefronts. The Knuessl is one of the most intact mid-19th century buildings in Ottawa. It is a locally significant example of a mid-19th century commercial design, Italianate, and was added to the National Register of Historic Places on May 11, 1992.
