= Washington Park Historic District (Ottawa, Illinois) =

Historic district in Illinois, United States

- U.S. National Register of Historic Places
- U.S. Historic district
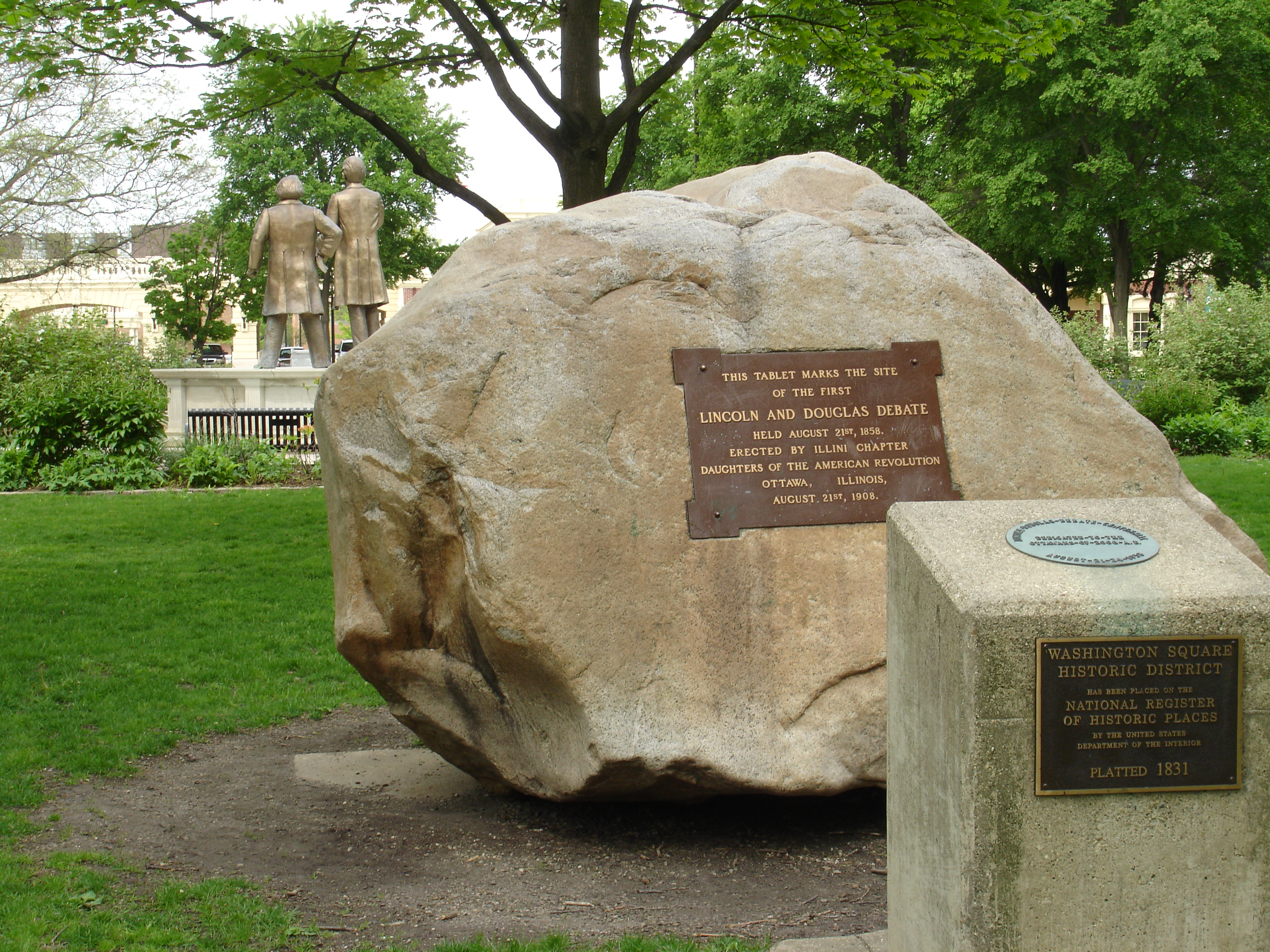
- The site of the first Lincoln-Douglas debate in Washington Park

- Location within Illinois Location within the United States
- Location: Bounded by Jackson, LaSalle, Lafayette, and Columbus Sts., Ottawa, Illinois
- Coordinates: 41°20′58″N 88°50′31″W
- Area: 12.8 acres (5.2 ha)
- Architectural style: Gothic Revival, Classical Revival, Italianate
- NRHP reference No.: 73000710
- Added to NRHP: April 11, 1973

Washington Park Historic District, also known as Washington Square, is a historic district in and around Washington Park in the city of Ottawa, Illinois, United States. Washington Park was the site of the first Lincoln-Douglas debates of 1858 and is surrounded by several historic structures. The park was platted in 1831 and the historic district was added to the United States National Register of Historic Places in 1973.

== Boundaries ==
The boundaries of the Washington Park Historic District are limited to the area around Washington Park, known as Washington Square. On its north, the district is bounded by the east-west Lafayette Street, on the south by Jackson Street. The east side of the district is bounded by Columbus street, and the west side by LaSalle Street. The historic district includes seven separate properties as contributing members, there were originally eight but one has been demolished since the district was designated.

== History ==
Washington Park was platted in 1831 and created by the Illinois-Michigan Canal Commission when the "states addition" of Ottawa was laid out. This was part of the original plat for the city. The park was the site of the first Lincoln-Douglas debate in 1858, and has served other civic functions through the years. In 1973 the park and surrounding area was designated a historic district by the U.S. National Register of Historic Places and several of the properties have local landmark designations as well. In 2002 a project to install Lincoln-Douglas debate statues was undertaken and completed.

== Washington Park ==
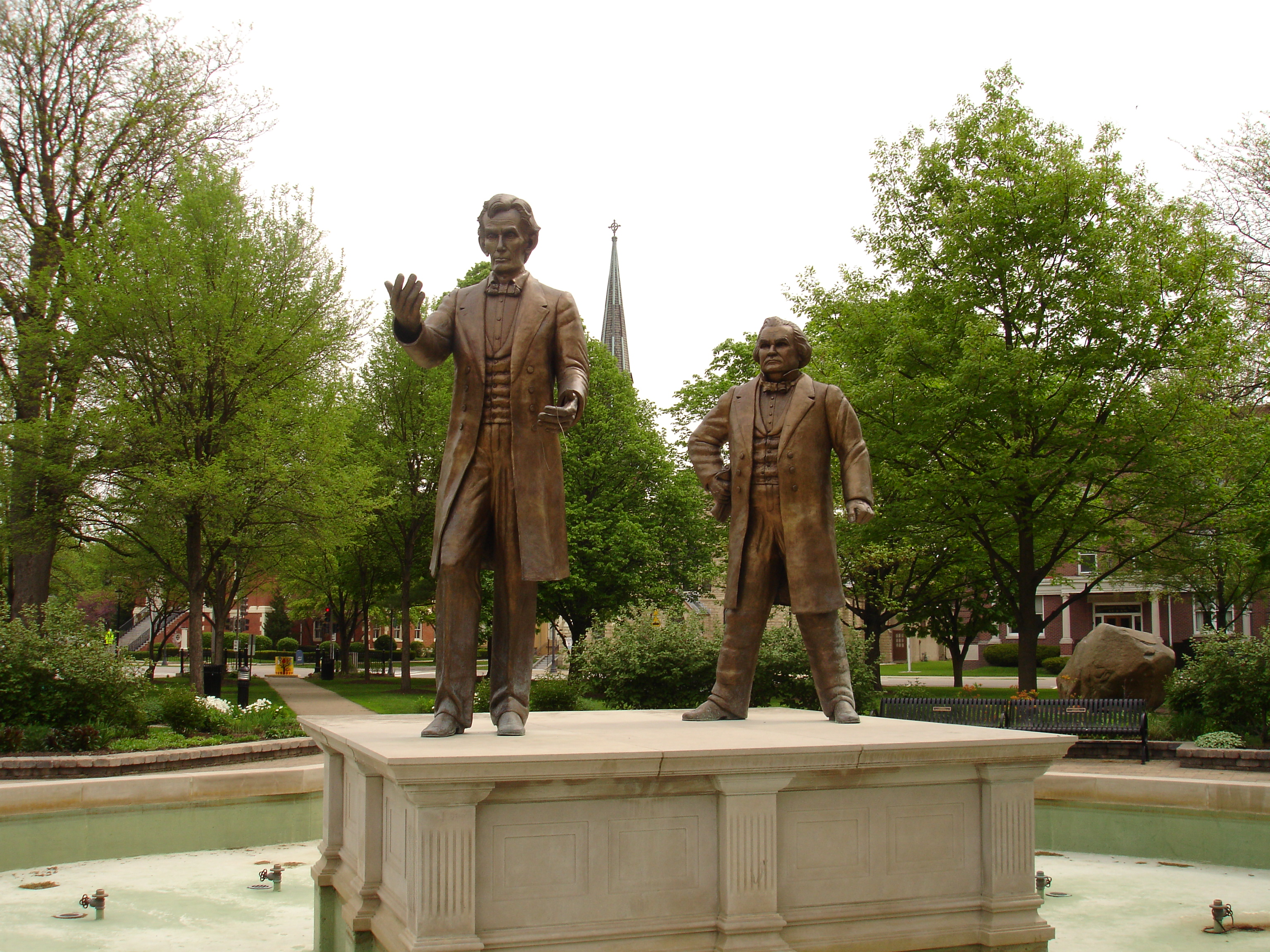
Statues of Lincoln and Douglas near the site of their 1858 debate

Washington Park occupies a square of one city block on the edge of downtown Ottawa and is surrounded by several significant historic structures. Within the park are objects and structures such as the 1873 Civil War Memorial, cannons from the Civil War, World War I and World War II, and a marker noting the site of the first Lincoln-Douglas debate.

The park's central patio is dominated by a fountain and reflecting pool centered with larger-than-life depictions of Abraham Lincoln and Stephen A. Douglas. The fountain and reflecting pools, and thus, the statues, are in a plaza which is surrounded by limestone. The statue project was completed by artist Rebecca Childers Caleel with metal casting completed by Art Casting of Illinois. The bronze statues were completed under the guidance of the city's historic preservation commission and dedicated on September 14, 2002. The Lincoln statue is 11 feet (3.4 m) tall and the Douglas statue is 9 feet (2.7 m) tall. Because of their recent installation, the statues are not part of the historic district.

The park has been popular during the holiday season as well as being a major focus of civic life in Ottawa from the 1850s into the present. In addition to the historical features within and surrounding the park there are features more traditional to parks such as greenspace, benches, lighting and walkways. Plant life includes well-manicured lawns, shade trees, evergreens, and tea roses.

== Historic properties ==
=== 3rd Appellate Court ===
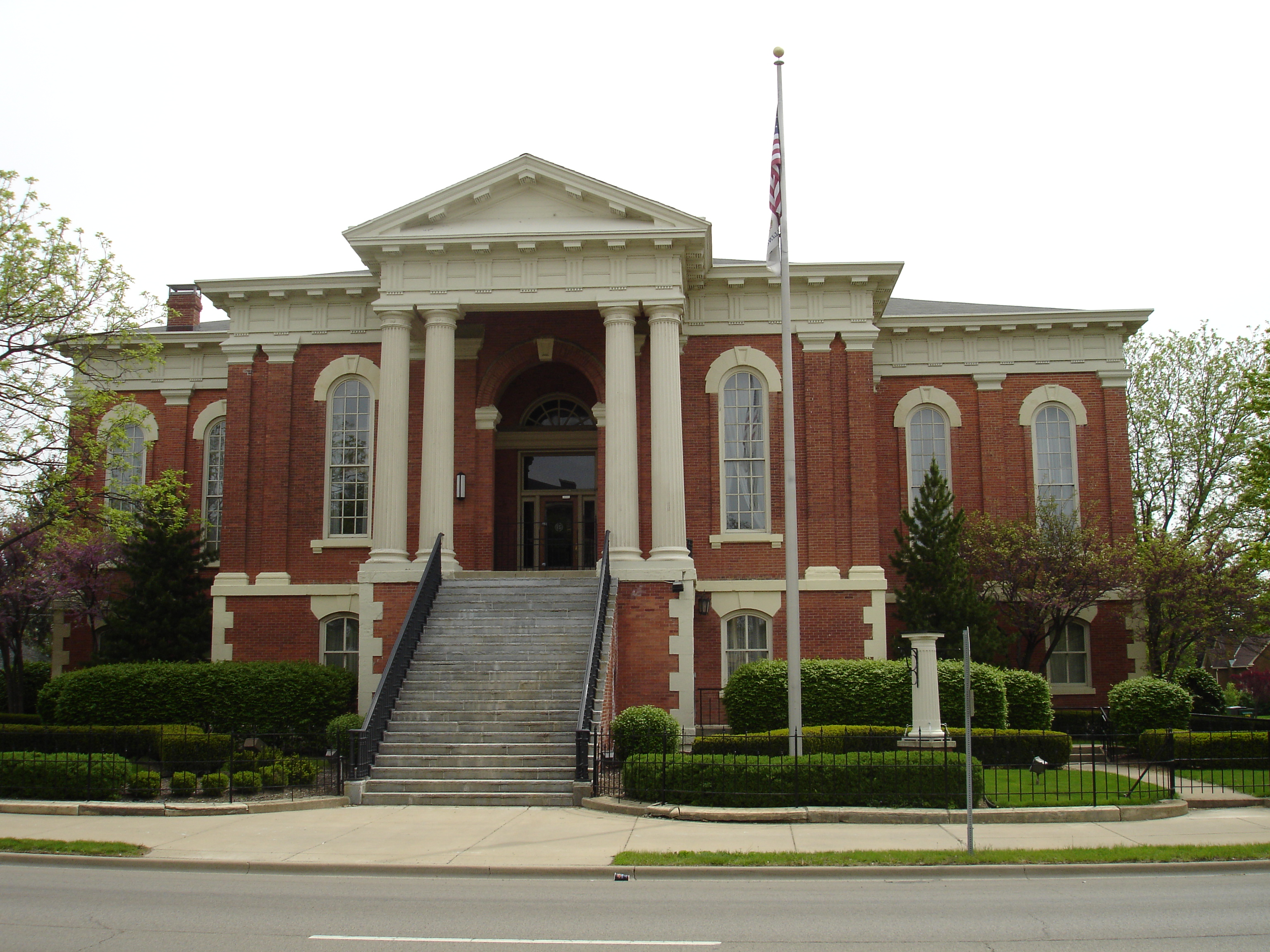
The 3rd Appellate Court building is an example of Classical Revival architecture

The Third District Appellate Court Building is found on the northeast corner of the square. The court building was constructed between 1857–60 and served as one of the Illinois State Supreme Court buildings for a decade. In 1897, the state supreme courts at Ottawa, Mt. Vernon, and Springfield were consolidated into one in Springfield. The court in Ottawa, one of five in the state of Illinois, played a role in drawing the Lincoln-Douglas Debate to the city. The building, at 1004 Columbus Street in Ottawa, still serves as the Third District Appellate Court of Illinois.

The Third District Appellate Court building is an example of Classical Revival architecture. It features dominating Doric columns, as well as a large pediment. The central portion was built during the original construction period at a cost of nearly US$230,000. The building's wings were added on in 1877. The building is constructed of red brick and detailed in Joliet limestone. These features, coupled with the Classical elements give the structure an architectural harmony. Because of this harmony the Ottawa Community Art Council has deemed the Third District Appellate Courthouse, "one of Ottawa's most handsome public buildings".

=== Civil War Memorial ===
The Civil War Memorial in Washington Park is a marble memorial column erected in 1873. The monument was designed and built by Edward McInnhill. The monument and statue atop it, known as the Goddess of Liberty, pays tribute to LaSalle County American Civil War veterans. The marble faces contain the name of over 800 Civil War dead but most of the names are unreadable due to deterioration.

=== Congregational Church ===
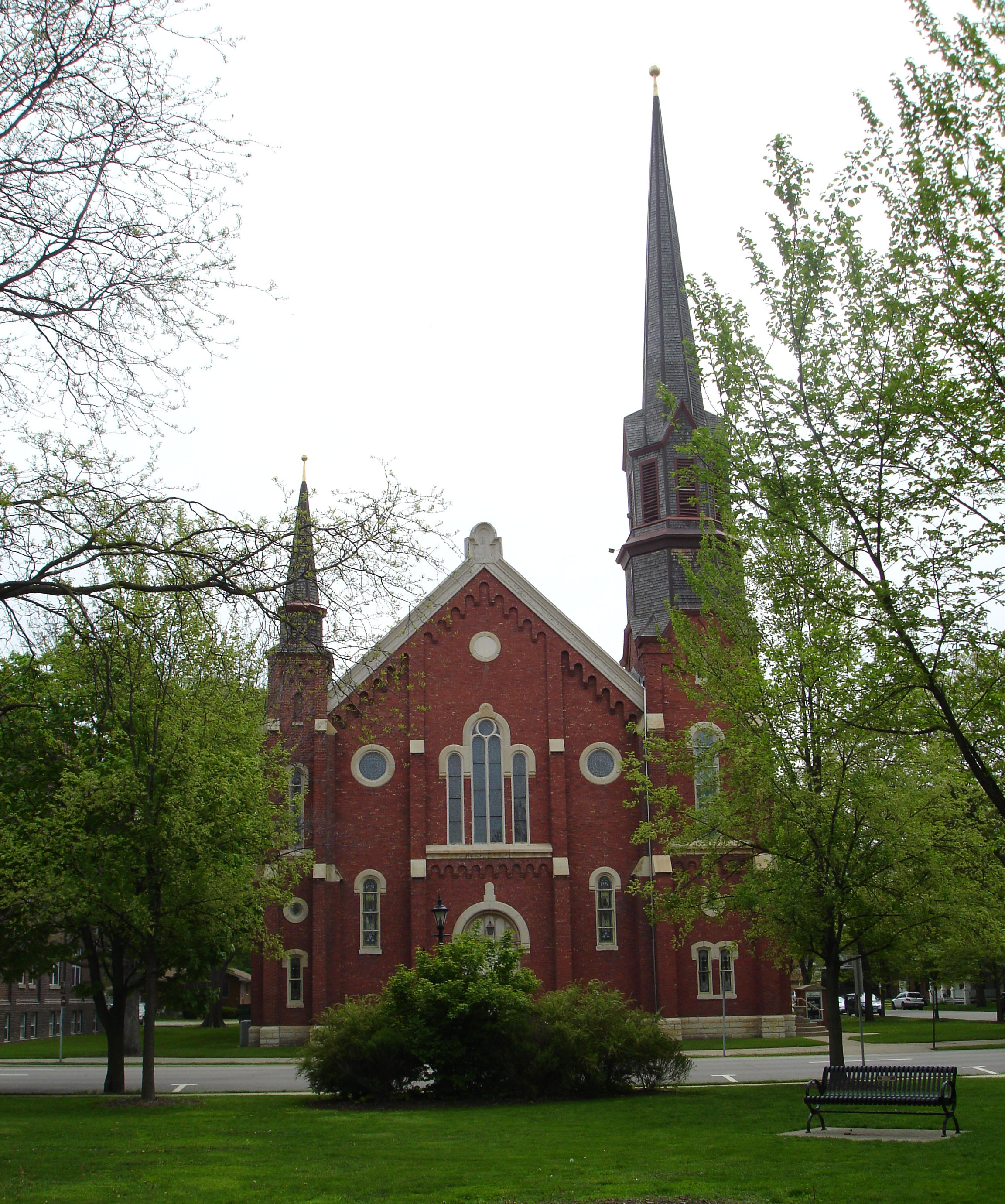
The 1870 First Congregational Church

The Ottawa First Congregational Church was constructed near the intersection Jackson and Columbus Streets facing Washington Park in 1870. The building is of brick construction and cast in the Gothic Revival style.

=== Christ Episcopal Church ===
Christ Episcopal Church, is the architecturally superior of the two churches located on Washington Square. Found at the intersection of Lafayette and Columbus Streets, the church is opposite the Third District Appellate Courthouse. The church was constructed in 1871 by the first Episcopalian congregation to organize itself in Ottawa; the congregation first held services in 1838. The Episcopal Church was designed by architect A.H. Ellwood in the Gothic Revival style of the English Victorian era. The building features a "Wallace Window" depicting the Resurrection. It was designed by German artist Julius Hübner.

=== Lincoln-Douglas debate site ===
On August 21, 1858, the first of the Lincoln-Douglas debates was held in Ottawa's Washington Park. The site of the debate is marked by a large boulder affixed with a plaque. The boulder was erected on August 21, 1908, by the Daughters of the American Revolution. The day of the debates 10,000 people flocked to Washington Square. Salesmen sold their wares to the mingling crowd and excited politicians were canvassing and quarreling throughout the park.

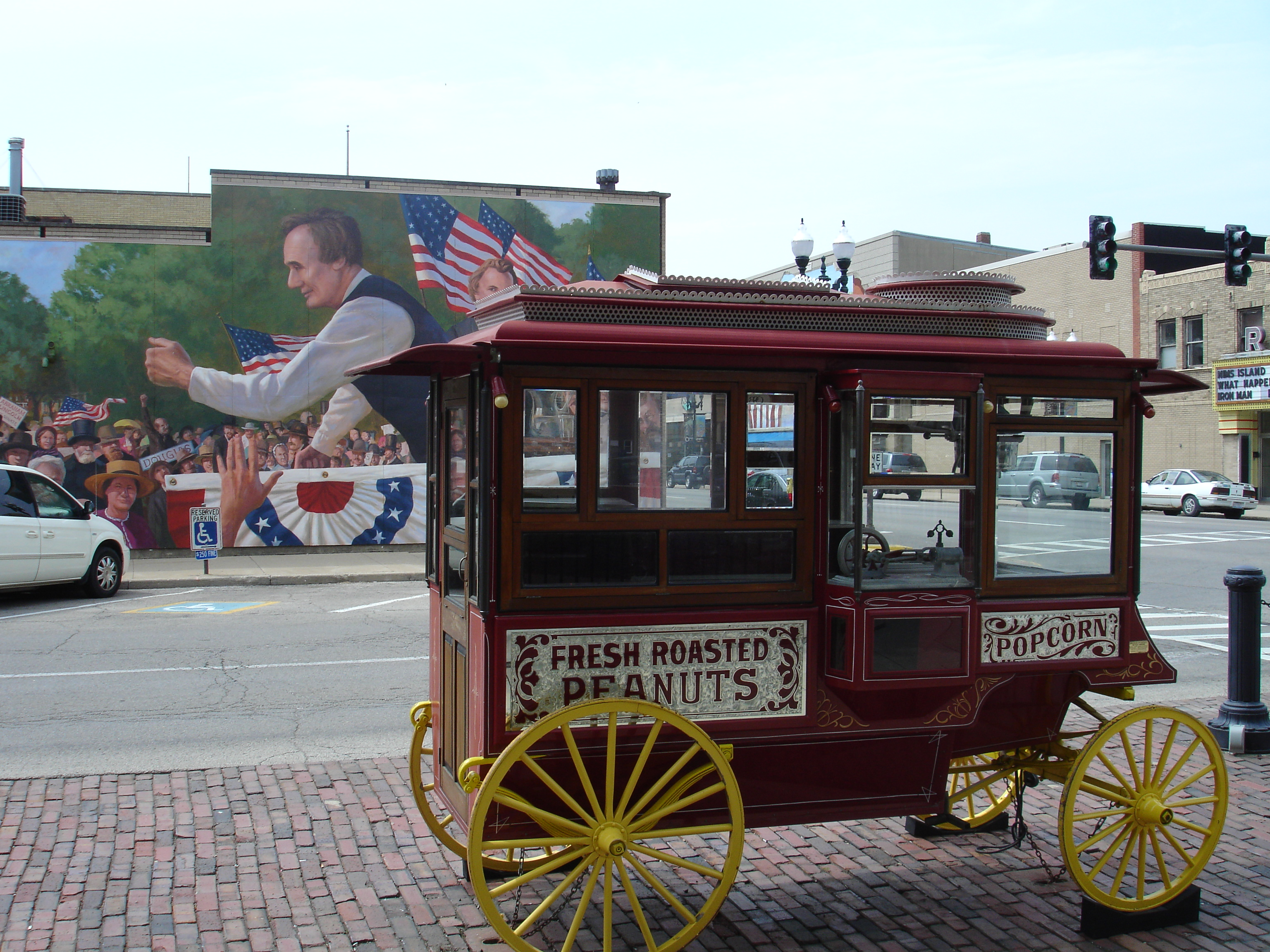
Circa 1890s popcorn wagon

=== Popcorn wagon ===
On the southwest corner of Washington Park is a largely unaltered c. 1890s working popcorn wagon.

=== William Reddick Mansion ===
The Reddick Mansion, alternatively Reddick's Library, was constructed in or around 1856 by then-sheriff William Reddick. The building occupies the lot opposite the Third Appellate Court and cost $40,000 to construct. Reddick served in the Illinois State Senate and returned to live in Ottawa, and the house, when he left office. He was known as one of Ottawa's colorful characters of the day and as a humanitarian. It is reported that Reddick housed runaway slaves in his mansion as a "station" on the Underground Railroad. He lived in the mansion until died in 1885.

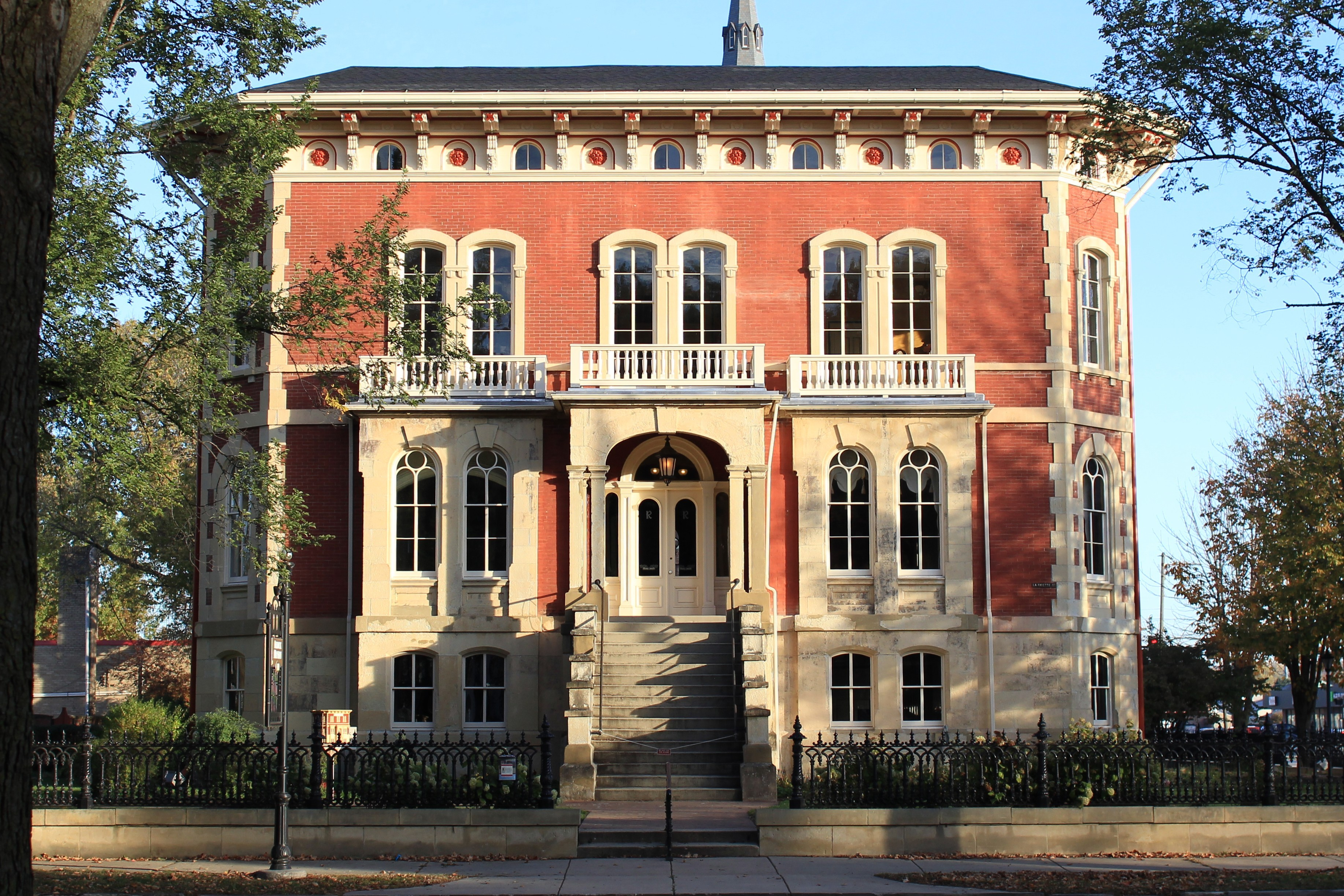
C. 1856 William Reddick Mansion

Reddick's will stipulated that the mansion be turned into a public library upon his death and he left an endowment of $100,000 to help accomplish that goal. The public library was established in the Reddick Mansion in 1888 and served the city of Ottawa in that capacity until 1974. That year the library moved to new facilities and the Reddick Mansion Association was formed with the aims of restoring and maintaining the house. The Reddick Mansion is currently open to the public for tours.

Architecturally the Reddick Mansion conforms to Italianate style, of which it is a fine example. The Reddick Mansion was designed by the architectural firm Olmsted & Nicholson. In the home's details, the brick and stone work, as well as the woodwork below the cornice and under the eaves are of particular architectural interest.

== Other properties ==
Within the historic district boundaries are properties that were once part of the district that have been demolished or removed. The LaSalle County Jail building was standing when the district was designated but it has since been demolished. The jail was converted from a circa 1880 single-family home and was most significant for its architecture as well as its association with local politics. Within Washington Park there were original 1857 gas lamps oriented in a circle as a memorial to W.D. Boyce, Ottawan and founder of the Boy Scouts of America. The lamps were located where the reflecting pool is today.

There are also properties that are not considered a part of the district, or what is known as "non-contributing properties". Before the 1980s most U.S. historic district listings did not keep track of non-contributing properties but today, the Illinois Historic Preservation Agency's HAARGIS Database does. The 1910 Masonic Temple building, a non-contributing property, is located on Columbus Street, between the two contributing churches.

== Historic significance ==
Washington Square is of special historic significance because it hosted the first of the famous Lincoln-Douglas Debates. The debates lasted three hours under the hot August sun and focused on the issues of popular sovereignty and slavery which set the tone for the other debates to come in 1858. Because of its historic significance as the location of the first Lincoln-Douglas debate, the integrity of its contributing properties, and significance to local life, the Washington Park Historic District was added to the U.S. National Register of Historic Places on April 11, 1973.
