= Ottawa, Illinois =

- City
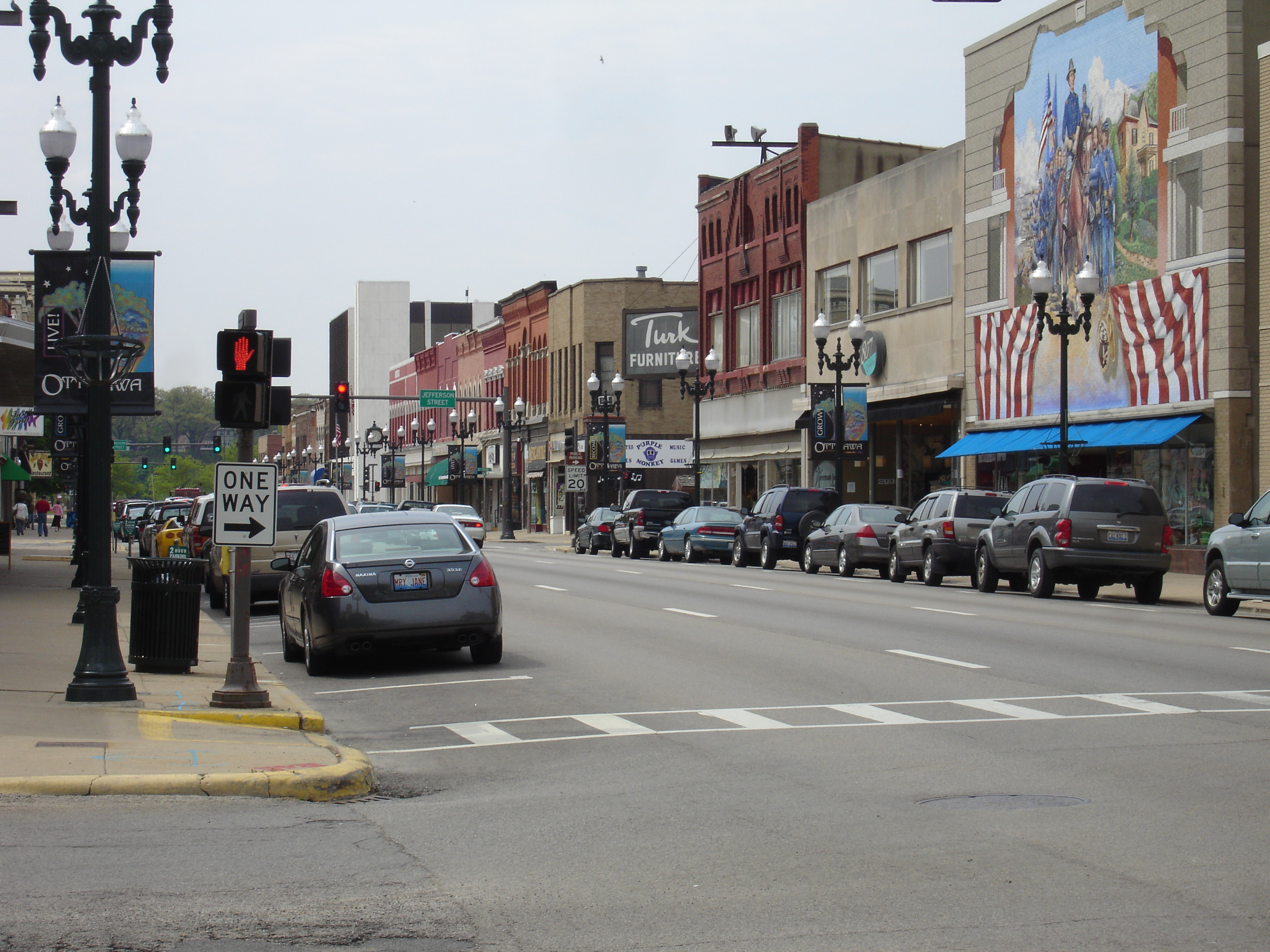
- Downtown Ottawa in May 2008

- Flag Seal
- Nicknames: Radium City, The Friendly City, The Town of Two Rivers, The City On Sand, The Town of Stovepipe hats
- Interactive map of Ottawa, Illinois
- Location within Illinois Location within the United States
- Coordinates: 41°21′20″N 88°49′35″W
- Country: United States
- State: Illinois
- County: LaSalle
- Townships: Ottawa, South Ottawa, Dayton, Rutland, Wallace
- Incorporated: 1853

Government
  - Type: Mayor–council

Area
  - Total: 15.52 sq mi (40.19 km^{2})
  - Land: 14.66 sq mi (37.96 km^{2})
  - Water: 0.86 sq mi (2.22 km^{2})
- Elevation: 476 ft (145 m)

Population (2020)
  - Total: 18,840
  - Density: 1,282.0/sq mi (494.98/km^{2})
- Time zone: UTC−6 (CST)
  - Summer (DST): UTC−5 (CDT)
- ZIP code: 61350
- Area codes: 815, 779
- FIPS code: 17-56926
- GNIS feature ID: 2396106
- Website: cityofottawa.org

Ottawa is a city in LaSalle County, Illinois, United States, and its county seat. It is located at the confluence of the navigable Fox River and Illinois River, the latter being a conduit for river barges and connects Lake Michigan at Chicago to the Mississippi River. The population was 18,840 at the 2020 census. It is the principal city of the Ottawa, Illinois, micropolitan area.

== History ==
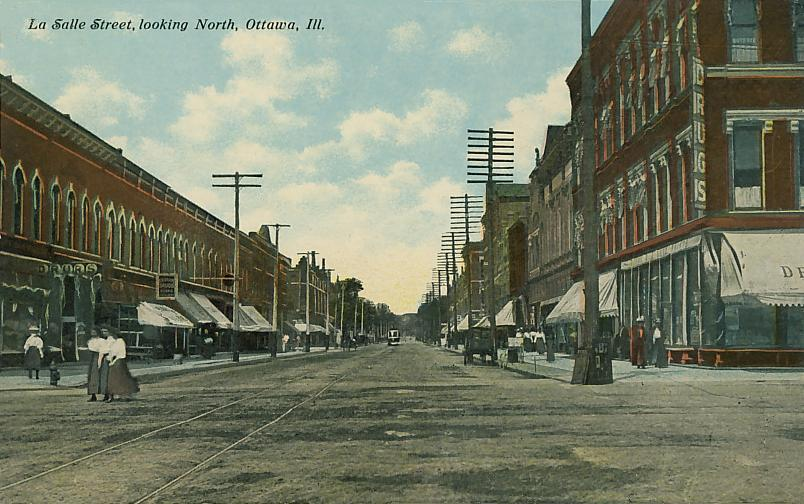
La Salle Street c. 1912

Ottawa occupies a place on the Illinois River that has long been one end of a portage trail between the Mississippi River and Lake Michigan. Here the river was reliably deep enough for canoes. The North Portage Trail connected the site over land and water to the Chicago River.

Ottawa was the site of the first of the Lincoln–Douglas debates on August 21, 1858. During the Ottawa debate, Stephen A. Douglas, leader of the Democratic Party, openly accused Abraham Lincoln of forming a secret bipartisan group of Congressmen to bring about the abolition of slavery.

The John Hossack House was a "station" on the Underground Railroad, and Ottawa was a major stop because of its rail, road, and river transportation. Citizens in the city were active within the abolitionist movement. Ottawa was the site of a famous 1859 extrication of a runaway slave named Jim Gray from a courthouse by prominent civic leaders of the time. Three of the civic leaders, John Hossack, Dr. Joseph Stout and James Stout, later stood trial in Chicago for violating the Fugitive Slave Act of 1850.

Ottawa was also important in the development of the Illinois and Michigan Canal, which terminates in LaSalle, Illinois, 12 miles to the west. In 1838, workmen from the canal project were causing public unrest. During a citizens' meeting, a local political leader, Washington Armstrong, suggested that farmer William Reddick be elected sheriff. Reddick was a popular choice due to his large stature and courageous manner. Reddick was elected by a large majority and held the office of sheriff for four consecutive two-year terms. In 1855, while serving in the Illinois State Senate, Reddick commissioned the construction of a large Italianate house for the then-large sum of $25,000 (~$664,619 in 2024). Reddick Mansion is now one of the largest surviving homes in Illinois to predate the Civil War. In 1973, the mansion was added to the National Register of Historic Places, as part of the Washington Park Historic District.

On February 8, 1910, William Dickson Boyce, then a resident of Ottawa, incorporated the Boy Scouts of America. Five years later, also in Ottawa, Boyce incorporated the Lone Scouts of America. Boyce is buried in Ottawa Avenue Cemetery. The Ottawa Scouting Museum, on Canal Street, opened to the public on December 6, 1997. The museum features the history of Boy Scouting, Girl Scouting and Camp Fire.

In 1922, the Radium Dial Company (RDC) moved from Peru, Illinois to a former high school building in Ottawa. The company employed hundreds of women called Radium girls. These women painted watch dials using a paint called "LUMA", which contained a compound of ZnS(Ag) (Silver activated Zinc Sulfide) and powdered radium, for watch maker Westclox. RDC went out of business in 1936, two years after the company's president, Joseph Kelly Sr., left to start a competing company, Luminous Processes Inc., a few blocks away. The employees of the company suffered radiation toxicity, as chronicled in the 1986 documentary, Radium City. After the plant closed and before it was dismantled, many residents took items from the factory for their homes. This spread the contamination even further. The building materials from the Luminuous Processes building were eventually turned into landfill. The U.S. Environmental Protection Agency began removing contaminated material in 1986.

=== Radium Cleanup ===
The Ottawa Radiation Areas site, located in LaSalle County, Illinois, consisted of 16 areas contaminated by radioactive materials. The 16 areas are scattered throughout the city of Ottawa as well as locations outside the city. EPA added the areas to the Superfund program's National Priorities List (NPL) because they are contaminated by the same wastes, involve the same potentially responsible parties (PRPs) and require similar cleanups. The contamination likely originated from the processing of wastes and demolition debris from the Radium Dial Company between 1918 and 1936 and from Luminous Processes, Inc. between 1937 and 1978. These businesses produced luminous dials for clocks and watches, using radium-based paint. Following actions to protect human health and the environment in the short term, EPA developed long-term remedies for the site. To date, EPA completed cleanup at 15 of the 16 contaminated areas.

Ottawa Radiation Areas - Cleanup Activities

EPA Ottawa Radium Cleanup Fact Sheet

Only one remains, known as NPL-08, and it is outside Ottawa City limits. In 2025, EPA started cleanup of this final remaining site, the NPL-8 Landfill and Frontage Property, located at U.S. Route 6 and IL Route 71 in Ottawa, Illinois.

Radium contamination from radium paint sticks to the soil in which it is situated. If protected from erosion, it does not move or leach into the groundwater or into the air. It does not create moving plumes of contamination underground. The remaining NPL-08 site is fenced off, protected from erosion and not adjacent to any currently developing property.

== Geography ==
According to the 2021 census gazetteer files, Ottawa has a total area of 15.516 square miles (40.19 km^{2}), of which 14.657 square miles (37.96 km^{2}) (or 94.46%) is land and 0.859 square miles (2.22 km^{2}) (or 5.54%) is water.

=== Climate ===
Climate data for Ottawa 5SW, Illinois (1991–2020 normals, extremes 1890–present)
Month	Jan	Feb	Mar	Apr	May	Jun	Jul	Aug	Sep	Oct	Nov	Dec	Year
Record high °F (°C)	68 (20)	73 (23)	85 (29)	93 (34)	106 (41)	107 (42)	112 (44)	107 (42)	103 (39)	94 (34)	83 (28)	71 (22)	112 (44)
Mean maximum °F (°C)	53.7 (12.1)	57.3 (14.1)	72.3 (22.4)	81.8 (27.7)	88.6 (31.4)	92.6 (33.7)	93.6 (34.2)	92.9 (33.8)	90.8 (32.7)	84.3 (29.1)	69.9 (21.1)	56.7 (13.7)	95.5 (35.3)
Mean daily maximum °F (°C)	30.7 (−0.7)	35.1 (1.7)	47.6 (8.7)	61.2 (16.2)	71.7 (22.1)	79.9 (26.6)	82.9 (28.3)	81.6 (27.6)	76.4 (24.7)	64.0 (17.8)	48.5 (9.2)	35.9 (2.2)	59.6 (15.3)
Daily mean °F (°C)	22.9 (−5.1)	27.0 (−2.8)	38.3 (3.5)	50.3 (10.2)	61.3 (16.3)	70.2 (21.2)	73.7 (23.2)	71.9 (22.2)	65.3 (18.5)	53.3 (11.8)	40.0 (4.4)	28.5 (−1.9)	50.2 (10.1)
Mean daily minimum °F (°C)	15.2 (−9.3)	18.9 (−7.3)	29.0 (−1.7)	39.4 (4.1)	50.9 (10.5)	60.5 (15.8)	64.4 (18.0)	62.3 (16.8)	54.2 (12.3)	42.6 (5.9)	31.5 (−0.3)	21.1 (−6.1)	40.8 (4.9)
Mean minimum °F (°C)	−6.0 (−21.1)	−0.8 (−18.2)	10.9 (−11.7)	25.5 (−3.6)	36.8 (2.7)	47.5 (8.6)	53.0 (11.7)	52.1 (11.2)	40.2 (4.6)	28.6 (−1.9)	16.4 (−8.7)	1.9 (−16.7)	−10.0 (−23.3)
Record low °F (°C)	−26 (−32)	−23 (−31)	−9 (−23)	12 (−11)	26 (−3)	35 (2)	39 (4)	33 (1)	25 (−4)	13 (−11)	−6 (−21)	−23 (−31)	−26 (−32)
Average precipitation inches (mm)	1.78 (45)	1.54 (39)	2.29 (58)	3.53 (90)	4.48 (114)	4.40 (112)	3.63 (92)	3.72 (94)	3.23 (82)	3.10 (79)	2.50 (64)	1.99 (51)	36.19 (919)
Average snowfall inches (cm)	9.2 (23)	5.2 (13)	3.3 (8.4)	0.4 (1.0)	0.0 (0.0)	0.0 (0.0)	0.0 (0.0)	0.0 (0.0)	0.0 (0.0)	0.0 (0.0)	0.8 (2.0)	4.8 (12)	23.7 (60)
Average precipitation days (≥ 0.01 in)	8.7	7.5	9.0	11.6	12.2	10.6	8.4	8.8	8.2	9.4	8.6	8.6	111.6
Average snowy days (≥ 0.1 in)	5.0	3.4	1.6	0.3	0.0	0.0	0.0	0.0	0.0	0.0	0.6	3.4	14.3
Source: NOAA

== Industry ==
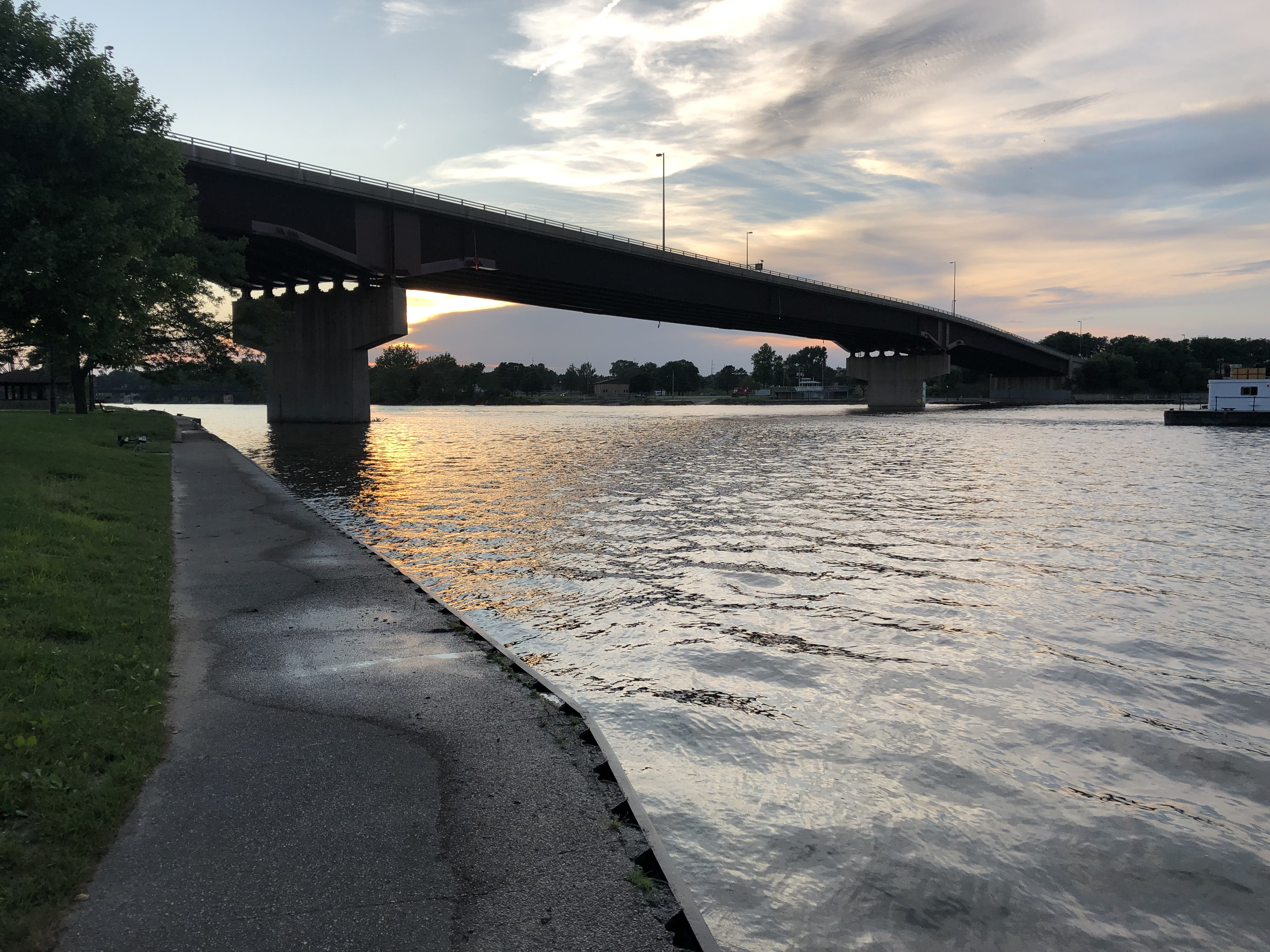
Veterans Memorial Bridge over the Illinois River in Ottawa

Because of numerous silica sand deposits (Ottawa sand was on board the ill-fated Space Shuttle Columbia for experimental purposes) Ottawa has been a major sand and glass center for more than 100 years. Transportation of the sand is facilitated by the navigable Illinois river and the Illinois Railway Ottawa Line. One of its largest employers is Pilkington Glass, a successor to LOF (Libbey Owens Ford). Formerly concentrated in automotive glass, the plant now manufactures specialty glass and underwent a $50 million (~$74.6 million in 2024) renovation in 2006. Ottawa sand continues to be extracted from several quarries in the area and is recognized in glassmaking and abrasives for its uniform granularity and characteristics.

SABIC recently(2007) purchased GE Plastics, a successor to Borg-Warner automotive glass manufacture, operates a large plastics facility in Ottawa, and is a major employer.

Ottawa sand is a standard testing medium in geotechnical engineering (laboratory demonstrations and research into new technologies).

== Demographics ==
Historical population
Census	Pop.	Note	%±
1870	7,736		—
1880	7,834		1.3%
1890	9,985		27.5%
1900	10,588		6.0%
1910	9,535		−9.9%
1920	10,816		13.4%
1930	15,094		39.6%
1940	16,005		6.0%
1950	16,957		5.9%
1960	19,408		14.5%
1970	18,716		−3.6%
1980	18,166		−2.9%
1990	17,451		−3.9%
2000	18,307		4.9%
2010	18,768		2.5%
2020	18,840		0.4%
U.S. Decennial Census

=== 2020 census ===
As of the 2020 census, Ottawa had a population of 18,840, with 8,204 households and 4,658 families. The median age was 41.6 years; 20.9% of residents were under the age of 18 and 19.8% were 65 years of age or older. For every 100 females there were 94.3 males, and for every 100 females age 18 and over there were 93.2 males age 18 and over.

99.6% of residents lived in urban areas, while 0.4% lived in rural areas.

There were 9,014 housing units, of which 9.0% were vacant. The population density was 1,214.23 inhabitants per square mile (468.82/km^{2}). The homeowner vacancy rate was 2.5% and the rental vacancy rate was 6.0%.

Of the 8,204 households, 26.3% had children under the age of 18 living in them. Of all households, 40.3% were married-couple households, 21.6% were households with a male householder and no spouse or partner present, and 30.3% were households with a female householder and no spouse or partner present. About 35.8% of all households were made up of individuals and 14.9% had someone living alone who was 65 years of age or older.

Racial composition as of the 2020 census
Race	Number	Percent
White	16,270	86.4%
Black or African American	462	2.5%
American Indian and Alaska Native	83	0.4%
Asian	195	1.0%
Native Hawaiian and Other Pacific Islander	7	0.0%
Some other race	480	2.5%
Two or more races	1,343	7.1%
Hispanic or Latino (of any race)	1,789	9.5%

=== Income ===
The median income for a household in the city was $53,544, and the median income for a family was $64,128. Males had a median income of $39,677 versus $26,514 for females. The per capita income for the city was $28,365. About 13.5% of families and 16.8% of the population were below the poverty line, including 24.9% of those under age 18 and 6.5% of those age 65 or over.

== Tourism ==
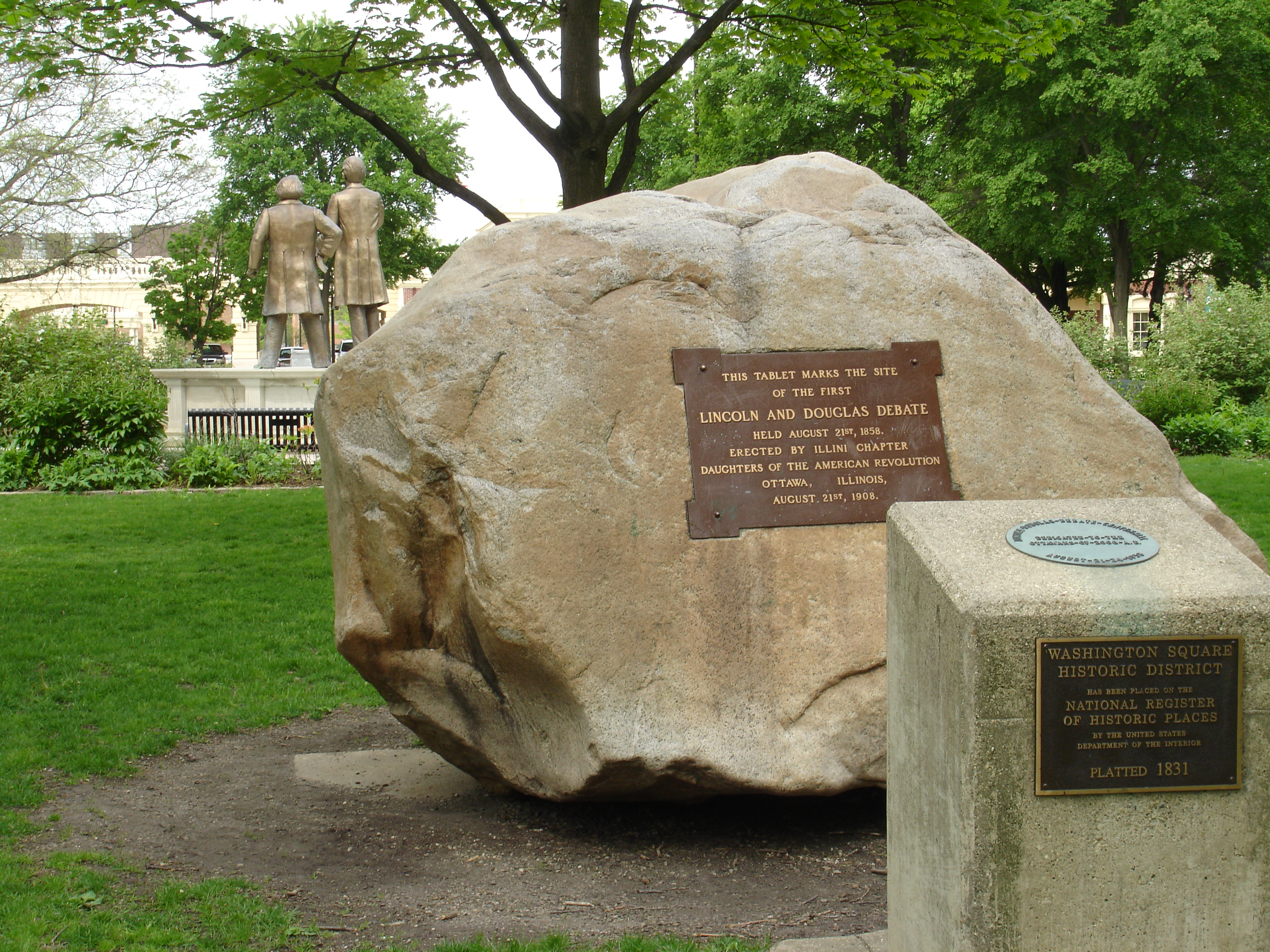
The site of the first Lincoln–Douglas debate in Washington Park

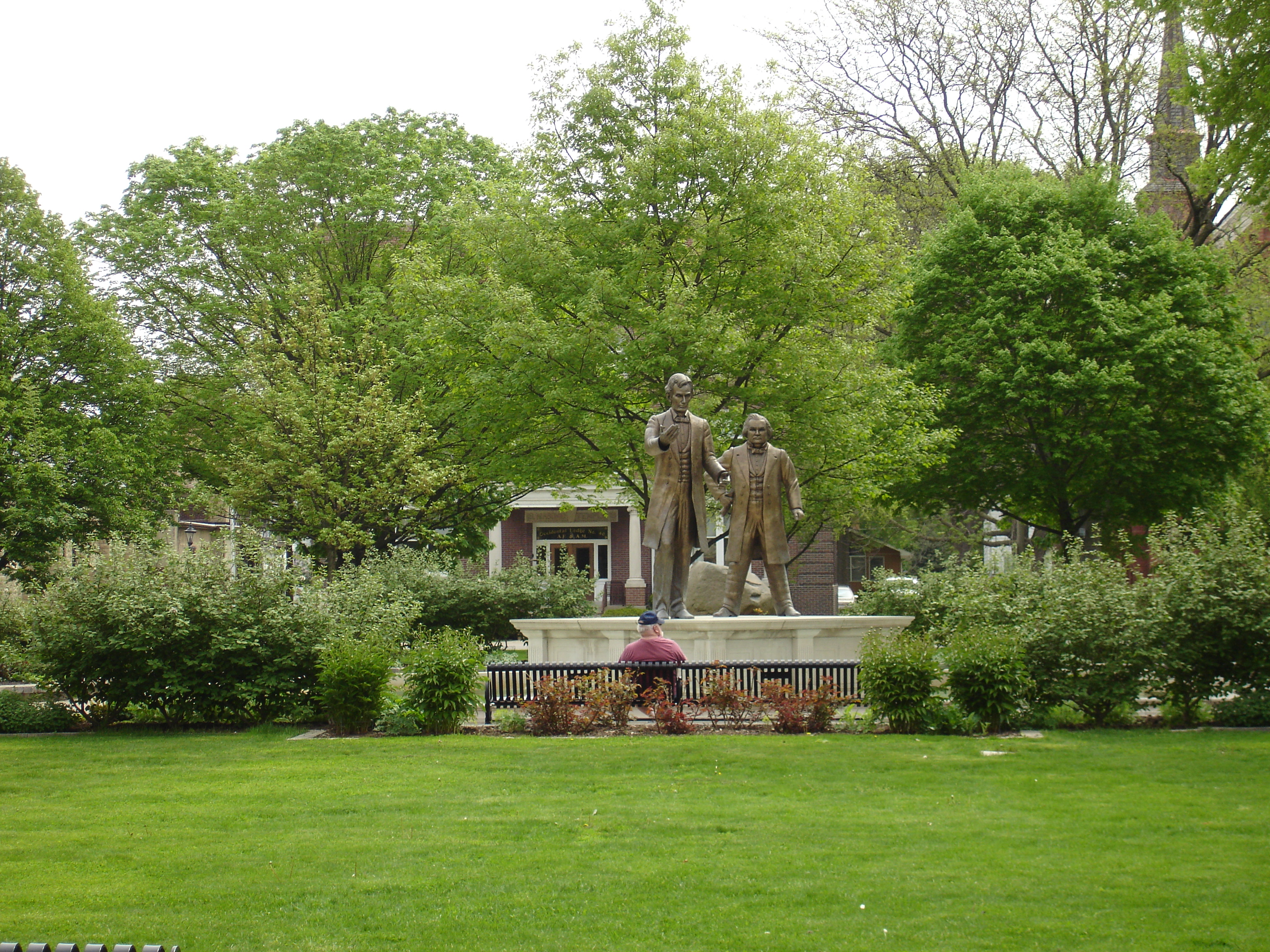
Statues of Lincoln and Douglas

Ottawa has many historic homes and registered historic landmarks. Recent additions to Ottawa have included renovations to its historic mansion, the Reddick Mansion, and artistic murals throughout the central business district. Ottawa is known as the scenic gateway to Starved Rock State Park, the most popular state park in Illinois, with some 2 million visitors per year. The Fox River, which flows through communities like Elgin and Aurora, empties into the Illinois in downtown Ottawa. Ottawa is also home to one of the largest skydiving operations in the country, Skydive Chicago.

The Ottawa Historical and Scouting Heritage Museum honors Ottawa resident William D. Boyce, founder of the Boy Scouts of America.

Jacob C. Zeller founded the Zeller Inn and Court Place Tavern in 1871, at 615 Columbus Street. The original Zeller Inn was demolished in 1982. The Zeller Inn tavern, originally known as the Court Place, still remains, now called Zeller Inn. The courtyard patio area on Columbus street is where the original Zeller Inn stood. The tavern contains the original mahogany bar built by the Sanders Bros in Ottawa, marble counters, tiled floors and walls, stained glass door and light fixtures. It also was known for its Gilded Age brilliance — tiled mahogany bar, carved gargoyles, pressed-tin ceiling and solid oak backbar. The mirror on the bar is the same since its establishment in 1871, which was brought over from the 1800s era European Worlds Fair. Zeller's initials, JCZ, are still visible in a tiled mosaic on the side of the bar and in the glass light domes that hang from the ceiling. This is one of the oldest taverns in Illinois, with original features which remain intact and displays the architectural details prominent in the late 1800s.

== Media ==
Ottawa was served by two local newspapers. The older of the two, The Daily Times, merged with the Streator-based Times-Press in 2005 to become The Times. The Times still publishes a print edition five days a week and is available as an online newspaper. The second was a weekly newspaper called Ottawa Delivered, which closed in 2012. Ottawa is also served by the NewsTribune of La Salle, Illinois.

Ottawa also has three local radio stations, WCMY-AM at 1430, WRWO-LP at 94.5, and WRKX-FM at 95.3.

== See also ==
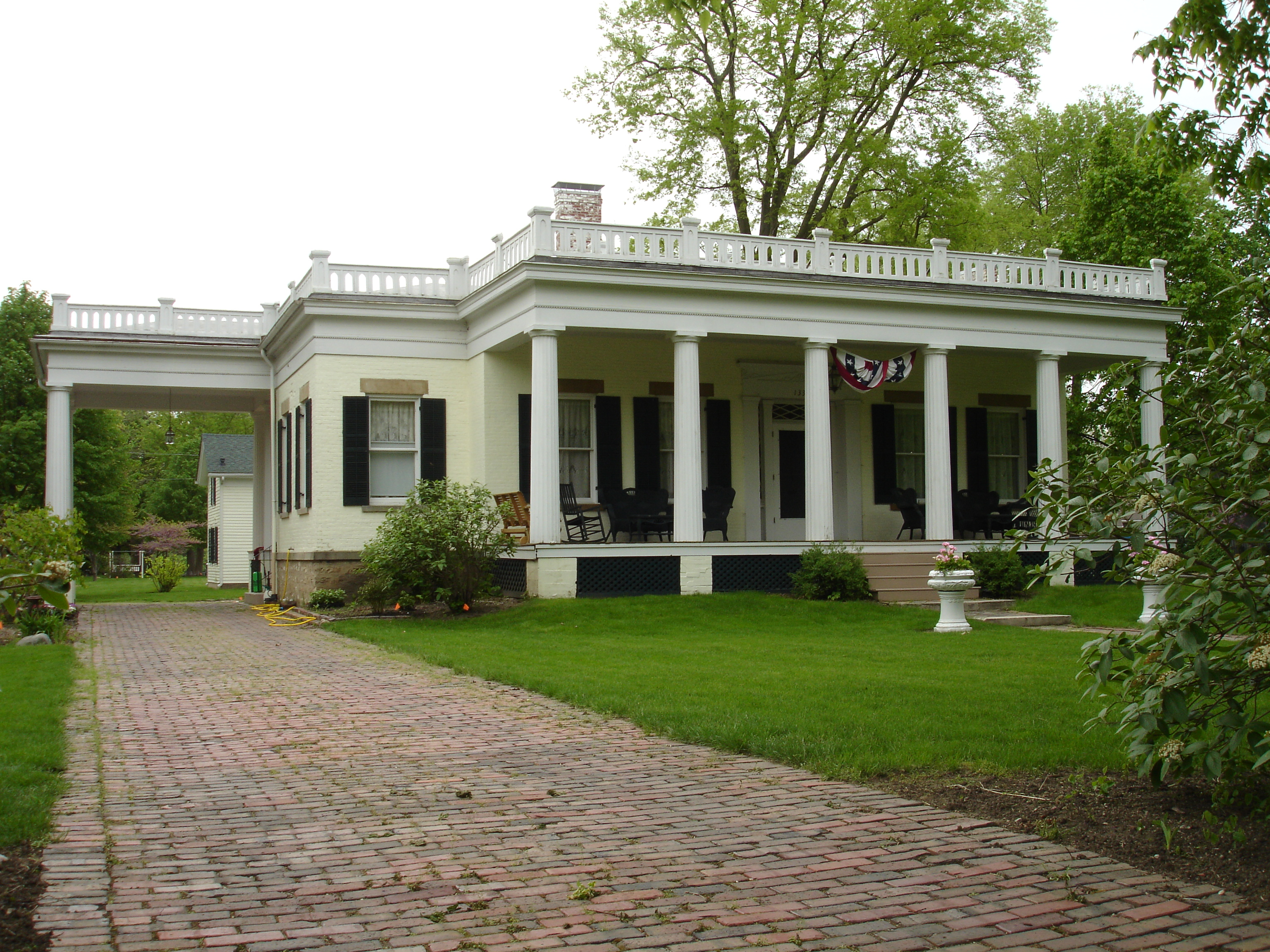
Fisher–Nash–Griggs House

- Fisher–Nash–Griggs House
- Jeremiah Strawn House
- Knuessl Building
- Marquette Academy
- Andrew J. O'Conor III House
- Ottawa Commercial Historic District
- Ottawa East Side Historic District
- Ottawa Station (Rock Island Line)
- Ottawa Township High School
- Starved Rock
- Summit View Cemetery
- Volvo Island
