= In Small Things Forgotten =

Book by James Deetz

In Small Things Forgotten: An Archaeology of Early American Life was originally published in 1977 by anthropologist James Deetz. The book presents the idea that small objects can play big parts in an individual's life, and should therefore not be taken lightly in an archaeological investigation. The book is one of Deetz's most popular and has become a staple piece of literature for those studying historical archaeology.

== Authorial background ==
James Fanto Deetz was an American anthropologist known for his work surrounding colonial New England and everyday Pilgrim life. Deetz was born in Cumberland, Maryland on February 8, 1930, and died on November 25, 2000, in Charlottesville, Virginia after a battle with pneumonia.

His training in anthropology began at Harvard University where he graduated Phi Beta Kappa in 1957. He began teaching anthropology at Harvard while working for his PhD. which he would earn three years later. His interest in American colonialism was sparked when he became involved in an effort to reconstruct Plimoth Plantation, an outdoor museum meant to reveal the lives of Pilgrims in Plymouth, Massachusetts. While teaching at Harvard, Deetz led excavations with the intention of further exploring the lives of these individuals through their places of dwelling.

Deetz was a part of the processual archaeology movement which arose in America during the 1960s, also known as "new archaeology". Spearheaded by anthropologist Lewis Binford, new archaeology is characterized most by its shift to a more scientific approach to conducting anthropological research. In addition to helping bring New Archaeology to the forefront of American anthropological theory, Deetz is also credited with establishing historical archaeology as a legitimate discipline, and defining its role within anthropology.

== Title meaning ==
The phrase in small things forgotten refers to the significance of seemingly trivial everyday objects that often vanish from traditional historical narratives—artifacts overlooked in historical documents but found in archaeological contexts. The title echoes a phrase found in a 1658 probate inventory in Plymouth, Massachusetts, in which the appraiser concluded: “In small things forgotten, eight shillings six pence,” acknowledging that not everything of value had been accounted for.

In the book, Deetz argues that “small things” — pottery shards, door hinges, gravestones, musical instrument fragments — carry stories of daily colonial life that fill the gaps between large historical events, and that these often-overlooked material remnants are essential for reconstructing a fuller, richer understanding of human life.

== Plot summary ==
=== Chapter 1: Recalling Things Forgotten: Archaeology and the American Artifact ===
Chapter one is focused on the unique role of the historical archaeologist compared to the prehistoric archaeologist. While the addition of written materials is in many ways beneficial to the anthropologist, there can also be drawbacks to being presented with multiple strains of information. As Deetz explains, "historical archaeology must work with parallel and related sets of information. Yet in some cases there is a disturbing contradiction between what is excavated and what is written down". Additionally, there are problems that come along with artifact typology. By sorting objects into types, an archaeologist risks grouping materials in ways that the original maker may not have intended. A broad category is not always able to capture the various uses or meanings that an object might have had. Despite these problems, the use of historical written materials along with an assemblage of artifacts is overall beneficial, as it forces the researcher to reassess the significance of their materials using multiple lines of evidence.

The chapter continues to detail the various differences between prehistoric and historic sites. The historic period has seen an increase in fill deposits, which can be incredibly useful (see garbology). However, materials recovered from these deposits can be misleading. In some cases, fill containing older artifacts has been moved to new locations, and materials from various sites and times of occupation could be mixed together. In other cases, clean fill might have been deposited in a structure in order to close it off. For an archaeologist, the clean fill could falsely signal a dead-end in a unit.

Historical archaeological sites also require different dating methods than prehistoric sites. Historical sites require a more specialized method of dating which will typically result in a more precise date. Ceramic typology one of these dating methods, as the types of ceramics being used in different areas at different times have been well documented. However, these techniques are also not without their problems, as certain vessels may be passed down from one generation to the next, skewing the data. Again, Deetz sees this problem as an opportunity for researchers to force themselves into finding new solutions and explanations for errors in calculations. Pipe stems have offered a more reliable (but less widely usable) method for dating, as Lewis Binford developed a method for calculating a date based on the diameter of the pieces being found.

Chapter one ends with the declaration that prehistoric archaeology has often relied on an acceptance of the most logical explanation of events, assuming that humans acted in ways that put their environment to use in the most efficient ways possible. Deetz believes that historical archaeology has proven, with the addition of written materials, that logic and efficiency are relative terms. Ideas of common sense can change drastically from one year to the next, and those changes only multiply as the years get added on.

=== Chapter 2: The Anglo-American Past ===
Chapter two begins by explaining that we can never know people of the past on a personal level, but that such specific knowledge is unnecessary when trying to understand life for all people on a broader level. Despite this, historical archaeologists are frequently drawn to sites that are associated with well-known figures.

Because there are so many historical sites available to archaeologists, it is important that researchers think through which sites should be excavated. It is also important that archaeologists approach an excavation with broader questions which allow the objects to speak for themselves, rather than forcing the objects to conform to a specific idea held by the researcher.

Deetz uses New England as an example of a culture's change being reflected in material remains. A change in style or architecture can reflect a change in tradition and way of life. This is an idea that archaeologists rely on frequently, as different cultures can produce different types of pottery, houses, or burial goods. Deetz has developed a "three-fold division of the cultural development of Anglo-America" which he believes is reflected in the material remains at the various sites at which he and his colleagues have excavated.

=== Chapter 3: All the Earthenware Plain and Flowered ===
Chapter three opens by asserting that ceramics are some of the most helpful pieces for an archaeologist to find, whether they be prehistoric or historical archaeologists. He says, "pottery is fragile yet indestructible: while it breaks easily, the fragments are highly resistant to corrosion and discoloration". Deetz also claims that for this reason, pottery is likely broken soon after it was manufactured, making it easy to pin down a date for these pieces.

He discusses three different classes of ceramics which are known to have been present in Anglo-American historic sites: earthenware, stoneware, and porcelain. After a description of these types, the chapter moves into an explanation of the various shifts that these pieces have taken, and how those shifts reflect the cultures producing these pieces.

One difficulty that comes along with ceramic analysis is that it is oftentimes difficult to envision the complete vessels, and the ways that they would have been used in their time. There is more to a ceramic piece than the category it is classified with, rather, each sherd should be seen as a part of a real person's daily life, holding meaning and significance. Ceramics were most often used in connection to a person's foodways. A change in material remains will often be connected to a change in a culture's practices. In this case, if an archaeologist is seeing significant differences in the pottery being used in an area, it may be reasonable to examine a possible shift in that group's foodways. Different social classes would have been eating different foods, and would therefore need different types of vessels to eat with. The type of pottery that a household chooses is often dependent on 4 factors: availability, need, function, and social status. It is important that an archaeologist recognizes these factors when examining an artifact, as there are multiple reasons why that piece would have been where it was, and individuals of the past should be seen as multifaceted beings who were capable of choice.

=== Chapter 4: Remember Me as You Pass By ===
Chapter four focuses on the mortuary remains of colonial Anglo-America, and what we can learn from a culture's burial practices. Mortuary practices provide archaeologists with a unique opportunity to see space, time, and form grouped together and carefully controlled. Because of this control, it is possible to keep two of these factors constant while examining change in the third. This has made it possible for certain prehistoric methods to be refined, such as seriation. Probate records make it easy to trace payments being made for gravestones, which is a valuable asset in this type of analysis.

Three basic designs were popular for New England gravestones: the winged death's head, the winged cherub, and the willow tree/urn. Variations in these designs would occasionally emerge in rural areas that existed in relative seclusion. The shift from one style to the next would oftentimes coincide with shifting religious views. Death's heads were connected to orthodox puritanism, the cherub emerged along with the Great Awakening, and the willow tree and urn styles often represented an individual who was not buried at that location, and tend to be separated from religion. These changes often paralleled changes in epitaph messages and headstone shapes, and they will often appear differently in different areas. Stylistic changes can also be traced from artist to artist, as different sellers were shown to have differing methods and signature styles.

There are, however, some drawbacks to this type of gravestone analysis. Because these patterns will emerge at different rates in different areas, it can sometimes be detrimental to rely on the generally used trajectory of stylistic change for analysis. It can also be difficult to find gravestones predating the 1660s, meaning that gravestone analysis is limited to periods following this time. Additionally, "religious institutions and their artifacts are known to be the most conservative aspects of culture, resisting change". In other words, religious iconography and the corresponding technology used to create it might not match all that was available at the time.

=== Chapter 5: I Would Have the Howse Stronge in Timber ===
Chapter 5 takes an archaeological look at the house as a representation of human social structure. "The form of a house can be a strong reflection of the needs and minds of those who built it; in addition, it shapes and directs their behavior".

A distinction is made between vernacular and academic buildings, with each representing a different cluster within the broader culture group. Vernacular building does not require the use of plans, and is typically built by the individual who will be occupying the structure. Because of this, "changes in attitudes, values, and world view are likely to be reflected in changes in vernacular form". Alternately, academic architecture is typically created by architects who have been trained in their field, and reflects more general stylistic trends rather than the views of the individual occupying the building. Both of these types of structures can be examined in a manner similar to ceramics and mortuary remains, as building styles will change over time and can be reflective of the culture that is creating them. There are three types of evidence that are used when trying to understand architectural changes in Anglo-America. These types of evidence are original structures which are still standing, architectural remains of buildings, and documentary materials.

Like most pieces of archaeological evidence, these structures require care when being used in analysis. If a building is still standing, it is important to remember that the stronger structures are more likely to survive for longer periods of time. They are not necessarily indicative of the wider array of structures being built. Focus and visibility need to be considered when examining structural remains. Focus refers to how representative the features are of the structure that would have stood in the past, and visibility refers to the number of remnants that are visible, regardless of how decipherable they may be. Focus and visibility may be reduced for a variety of reasons. For example, the longer a structure has been occupied, the lower the focus and visibility will be, as a result of renovations and damage.

=== Chapter 6: Small Things Remembered ===
The three varieties of artifacts discussed in previous chapters all have a special significance in archaeology that is usually not found in other types of artifacts. Ceramics relate directly to subsistence, a "universal human experience" and are common across most sites. Much of human existence occurs in houses, which are therefore an incredibly important part of understanding past lifeways. They also serve as important resources because structures are very durable in comparison to other material remains. Gravestones provide researchers with easily controlled studies which are also part of an incredibly personal and meaningful part of the human experience. All these types of artifacts suggest a changing worldview that occurred between 1760 and 1800 in Anglo-America. These changes have been attributed to a secularization of religion which went along with the scientific revolution occurring at the time. Changing religious institutions resulted in a breakdown of many peoples' understanding of the world, and many people sought out new ways to restore order in their lives. We are able to see these changes in the archaeological record, as people were accumulating new items to follow emerging trends in music and fashion.

=== Chapter 7: Parting Ways ===
Chapter seven seeks to bring attention to the often diminished African American experience in colonial America. These individuals are not always well represented in the documentary record, so it can sometimes be more effective to piece together smaller community histories based on oral traditions, rather than trying to describe a whole group. Deetz does this through his work at the Parting Ways site which has been the focus of much of his research. He uses fragmentary written works along with archaeological evidence to piece together a picture of the tiny community, with an emphasis on a man named Cato Howe.

=== Chapter 8: Small Things Forgotten ===
The final chapter concludes with a reminder that objects carry a special part of the past that can't be found in the written record. Although written accounts are incredibly valuable, they cannot stand alone as proof of the past. Literacy can be taken for granted by modern Americans, who tend to forget that literate individuals were in the minority for much of history. It is important that archaeologists recognize the major differences between people existing in the past and people existing in the present. Modern categories cannot be imposed on past peoples, and it is important to consider them in their own terms. In many cases, archaeological research can reveal more about modern minds than about the past people it is meant to represent. Objects "allow us to see into the past not through the writings of people who are communicating their particular view of the world, but through human actions that affected the material world in a broad and more general way". However, objects can also depend on the written record, and when the two are used well together, archaeology can be incredibly effective. It is important that small things not be forgotten, because "in the seemingly little and insignificant things that accumulate to create a lifetime, the essence of our existence is captured".

== Publications ==
- In Small Things Forgotten: An Archaeology of Early American Life was expanded and revised in 1996 in order to "more fully acknowledge the presence of women and African Americans in Colonial America".

== Reception ==
In Small Things Forgotten has been widely well received by its readers, being called "certainly one of the finest affirmations for the cognitive approach in historical archaeology". In addition to being a simple yet stimulating read, the book is credited with assisting archaeologists in the more practical aspects of archaeological work, such as identification of artifacts and dating of materials. The book has also been praised for its acceptance of multiple opposing viewpoints, as well as its ability to provoke thought in a variety of readers, whether or not they agree with Deetz's ideas. The New Archaeological techniques coupled with a simple and entertaining narrative has resulted in this book being considered by some to be "a cornerstone in the foundation of a scientific historical archaeology".

The book is not without its inaccuracies however, and it has been suggested that Deetz and his publisher were too eager to create a book that encompasses a vast array of ideas. While this approach resulted in a thorough examination of "things", there were also details that may have slipped through the cracks, something that might have been avoided if the book were more focused. For example, the declaration that "porcelain is quite unusual in archaeological sites before 1800" has been pointed out by critics as being inaccurate and a possible deterrent for ceramic historians and archaeologists. Additionally, the book has been criticized for its singular focus on New England archaeology, as the methods and theories presented may not be applicable to other locations and time periods.

== Legacy ==
In Small Things Forgotten has served as a pioneering piece of New Archaeological literature, and has shown that scientific techniques can be used effectively alongside documentary data. "Deetz's approach is synthetic, working from data outward, emphasizing qualitative as well as quantitative evaluations, incorporating multiple and complementary lines of evidence, and allying historical documents closely with excavated evidence".
