= Slave quarters in the United States =

Antebellum residential vernacular architecture

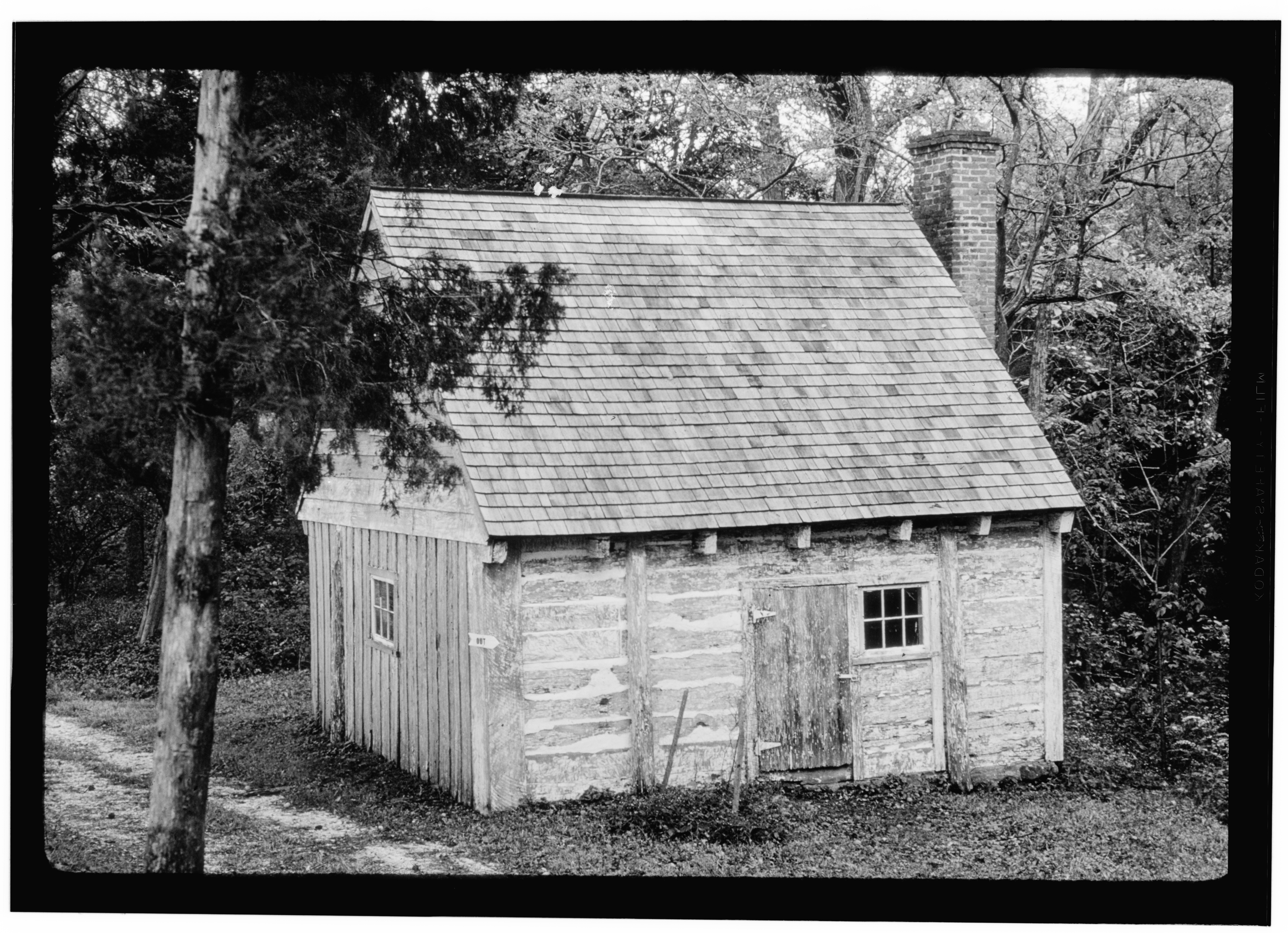
Sotterley Slave Cabin, Sotterly Plantation, Hollywood, St. Mary's County, Maryland, photographed c. 1933

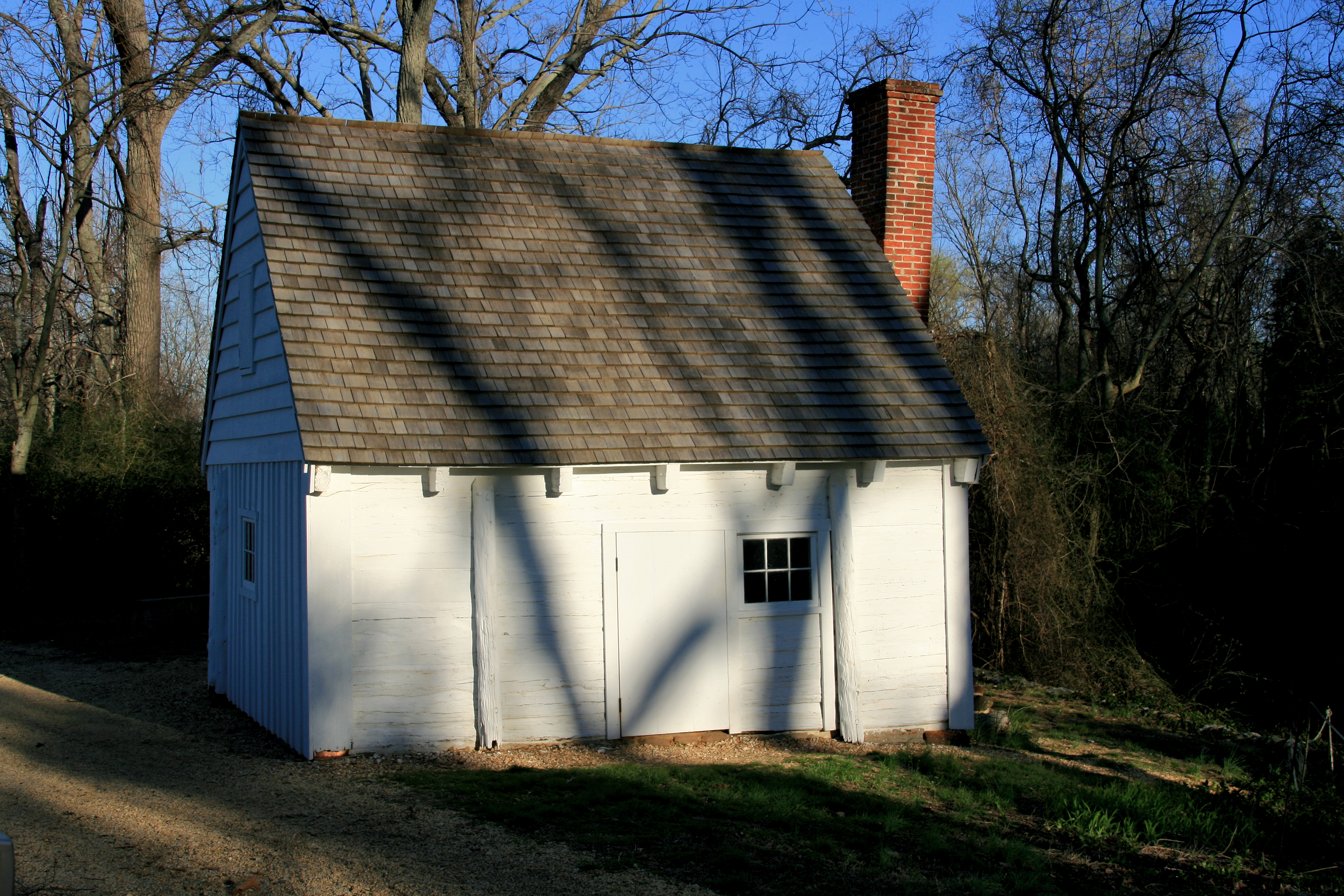
Sotterley Slave Cabin, built sometime between 1830 and 1850 in the Tidewater region, photographed 2011

Slave quarters in the United States, sometimes called slave cabins, were a form of residential vernacular architecture constructed during the era of slavery in the United States. These outbuildings were the homes of the enslaved people attached to an American plantation, farm, or city property. Some former slave quarters were continuously occupied and used as personal residences until as late as the 1960s.

== Rural slave quarters ==
=== Context ===
Plantation slavery had regional variations dependent on which cash crop was grown, most commonly cotton, hemp, indigo, rice, sugar, or tobacco. Sugar work was exceptionally dangerous—the sugar district of Louisiana was the only region of the United States that saw consistent population declines, despite constant imports of new slaves. The cotton plantations used the grueling gang system. Some plantations used the task system, which permitted slightly more leisure time and thus development of domestic life amongst the enslaved. As a rule, personal freedom for slaves was restricted to what could be achieved in the slave quarters from sundown to sunup.

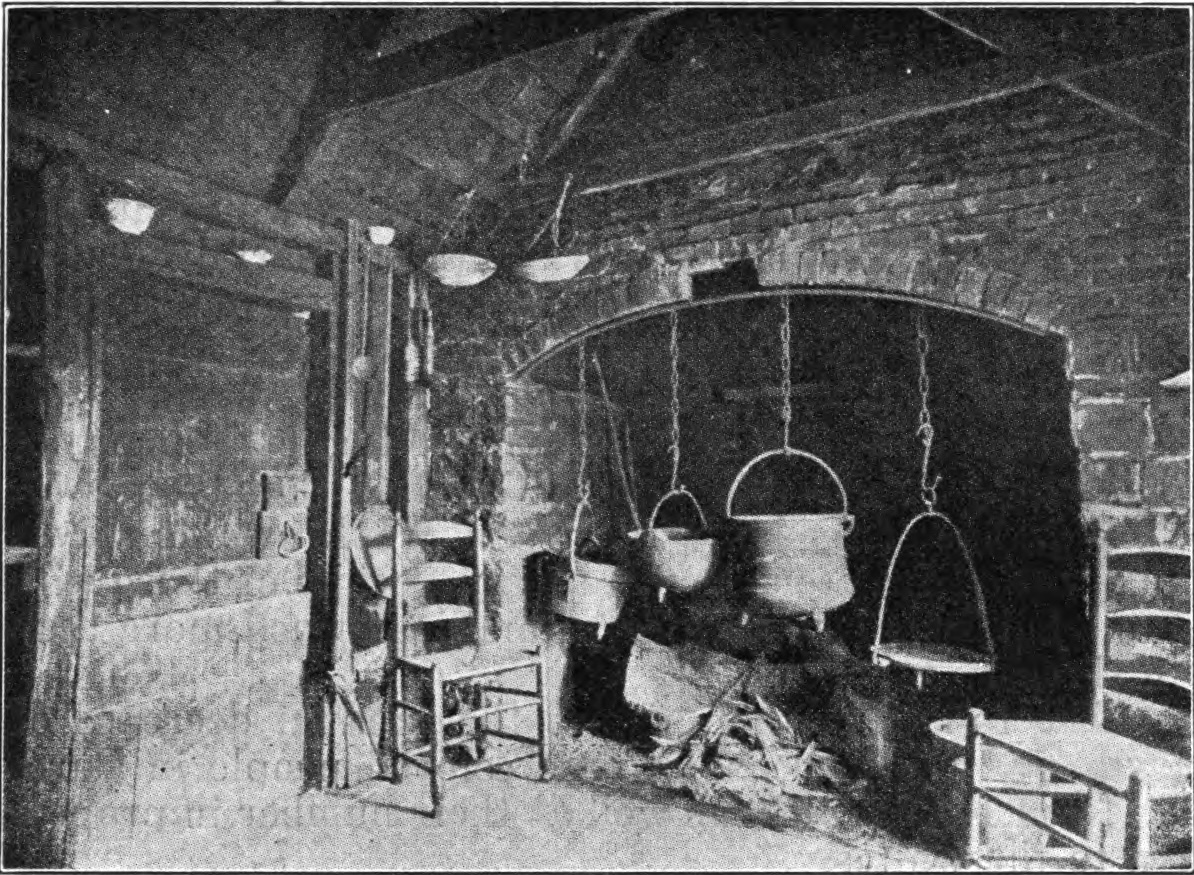
"Old Slave Kitchen" in Caroline County, Maryland, photographed 1920

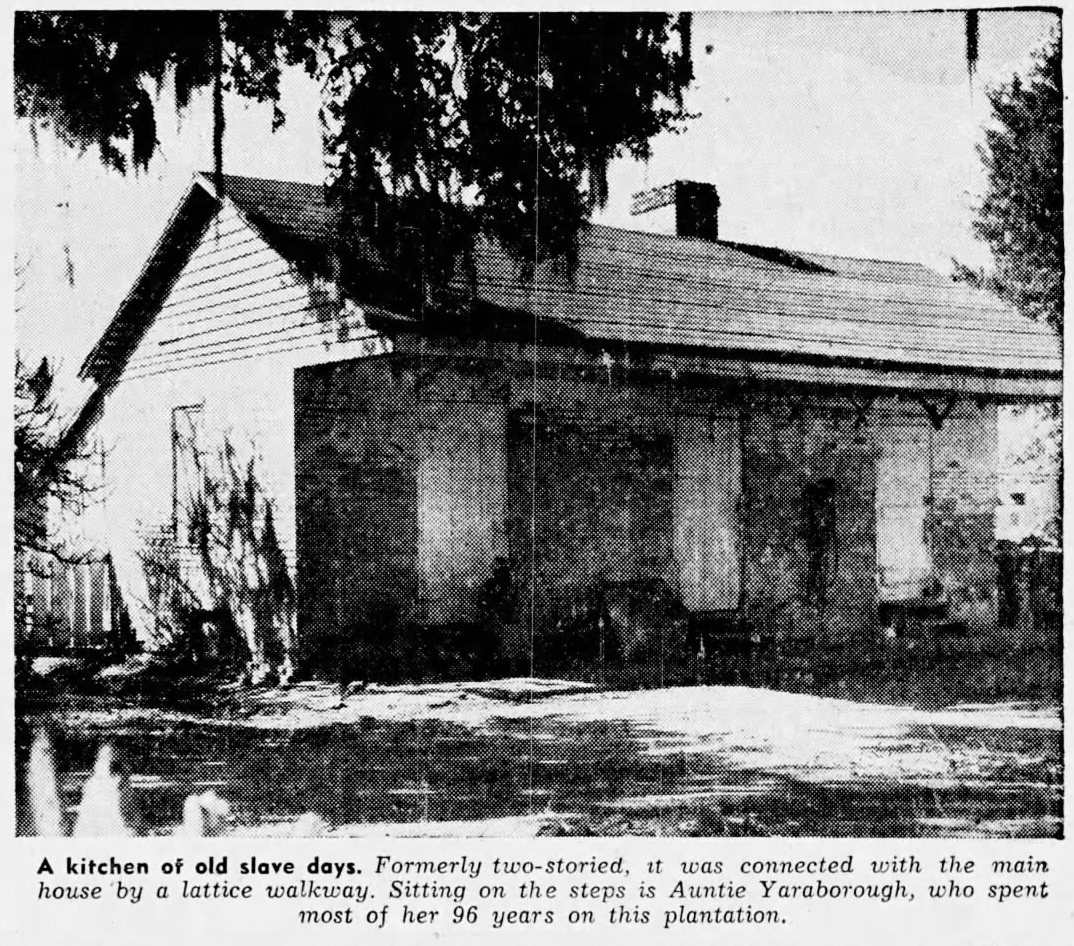
"A kitchen of old slave days" in Iberville Parish, Louisiana, photographed 1939

A traveler on the Mississippi in 1807 described the plantations in the vicinity of Point Coupee as having "Negro houses innumerable—being disposed almost contiguous to one another in a hurdle and adjacent to the manor house exhibit the view of small towns with their capitals." On some farms, slave houses were part of a larger, centrally located community group. For example, at Thomas Jefferson's Monticello, Mulberry Row was an area of the property where slave dwellings were built alongside a smokehouse, dairy, wash house, joinery, nailery/smithy, and a house where free stoneworkers lived during construction. After the stoneworkers left, the stoneworkers' house was used for textile production. Harriet Beecher Stowe quoted Rev. Westgate in A Key to Uncle Tom's Cabin (1853) about his impression of slave quarters, and he explained that construction materials depended on location and age of the site: "On old plantations the negro quarters are of frame and clapboards, seldom affording a comfortable shelter from wind or rain; their size varies from eight by ten, to ten by twelve feet, and six or eight feet high; sometimes there is a hole cut for a window, but I never saw a sash, or glass, in any. In the new country, and in the woods, the quarters are generally built of logs, of similar dimensions."

He had a number of negroes on his plantations, all of whom were lodged in hovels, as is the custom in this country.

— Francis Bailey, Journal of a tour in unsettled parts of North America in 1796 & 1797, published 1858

=== Field cabins ===
Field cabins were isolated and somewhat remote but offered agricultural workers close proximity to crop fields. Few field cabins survive as they were generally "left to rot" after the last residents departed.

=== Architecture and material culture ===
Rural slave quarters were usually one or two-room cabins occupied by a family unit. The individual rooms were called pens; houses were single-pen or double-pen. Some two-room cabins were duplexes hosting two families separated by a wall, each with their own entrance. Saddlebag plan houses had two units that were "separated by a central chimney". Dogtrot houses or open-passage houses had a breezeway between the two living spaces. Cabins with one room and a loft above were known as one up and one down.

A former slave cabin near Eufaula, Barbour County, Alabama, still in use as a residence and photographed c. 1936 for the Slave Narratives project of the Works Progress Administration

On average, slave quarters were log cabins with dirt floors, clay chimneys, wood-shingle roofs, and one unglazed window. Windows lacking glass would have been covered with shutters or curtains. Slave houses built in the 19th century were more likely to have plank floors and be raised on piers. Typical 19th-century quarters were around 200 square feet in area. Some slave dwellings in the United States were wood-frame or masonry buildings; slave quarters at two sites in South Carolina were found to have African-styled, clay-walled, wattle-and-daub construction that was common in the Caribbean slave housing but extremely rare in North America. Brick was an uncommon building material, but some slave quarters were constructed from field stone; for example, local limestone was used in Maryland. Contemporary documentarians report that former slave houses often have low ceilings, little natural light, and feel "stuffy". The home of the slave owner on the plantation or farm was typically called the big house. Slave quarters were usually located near the big house but subsidiary in size and quality of construction, and subject to surveillance, inspection and regulation. In some cases the slave owner lived off-site but an overseer's house was built near the slave quarters.

Bedding was usually either straw on the floor or a straw-filled tick with a thin blanket. Bedframes were uncommon; where they existed, they were constructed with cord. Bureaus, tables, and chairs were uncommon. Possessions of cultural significance included homemade musical instruments such as drums and fiddles fashioned from dried gourds. Household goods in slave quarters were minimal but might have included work tools, iron cookware, pewter spoons, and locally made pottery (colonoware).

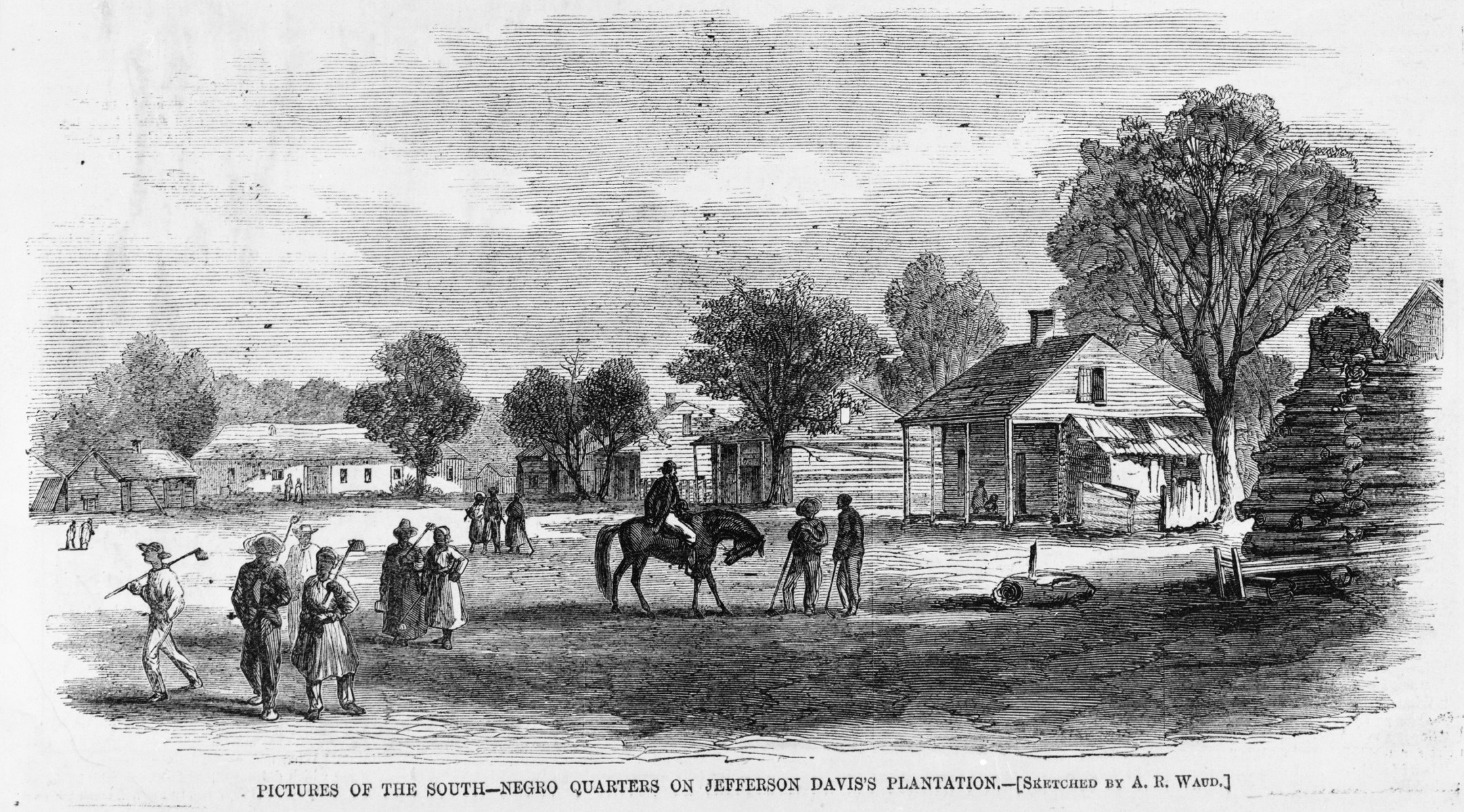
Former slave quarters at Jefferson Davis' plantation Brierfield in Mississippi, drawn by A.R. Waud, etching published 1866 in Harper's Weekly

The slave quarters often developed independent systems for food and cloth production. Enslaved adults on a plantation were provided with specific food rations and clothing allotments but these were typically inadequate, so the slave quarters were a place where preparations were made for hunting, trapping, and fishing, where chickens were kept, and where kitchen gardens were tended. In some cases, with an eye to time efficiency and maximizing profit, there was a central kitchen that provided all meals. Despite the fact that marriages of enslaved people were generally illegal, slave quarters were the site of weddings and were the "cradle of the black family", as babies were born and families raised there.

Many slave quarters also hosted burial grounds for the dead. Burials in slave cemeteries were often poorly marked even when in active use (carved stone grave markers would have been impossibly expensive), and over the decades and centuries essentially disappeared into the landscape even when they were not actively erased. As one reporter wrote upon visiting the ruins of Prospect Hill in Mississippi: "No one yet knows where the slaves are buried, their wooden markers long since having crumbled into dust."

== Urban slave quarters ==
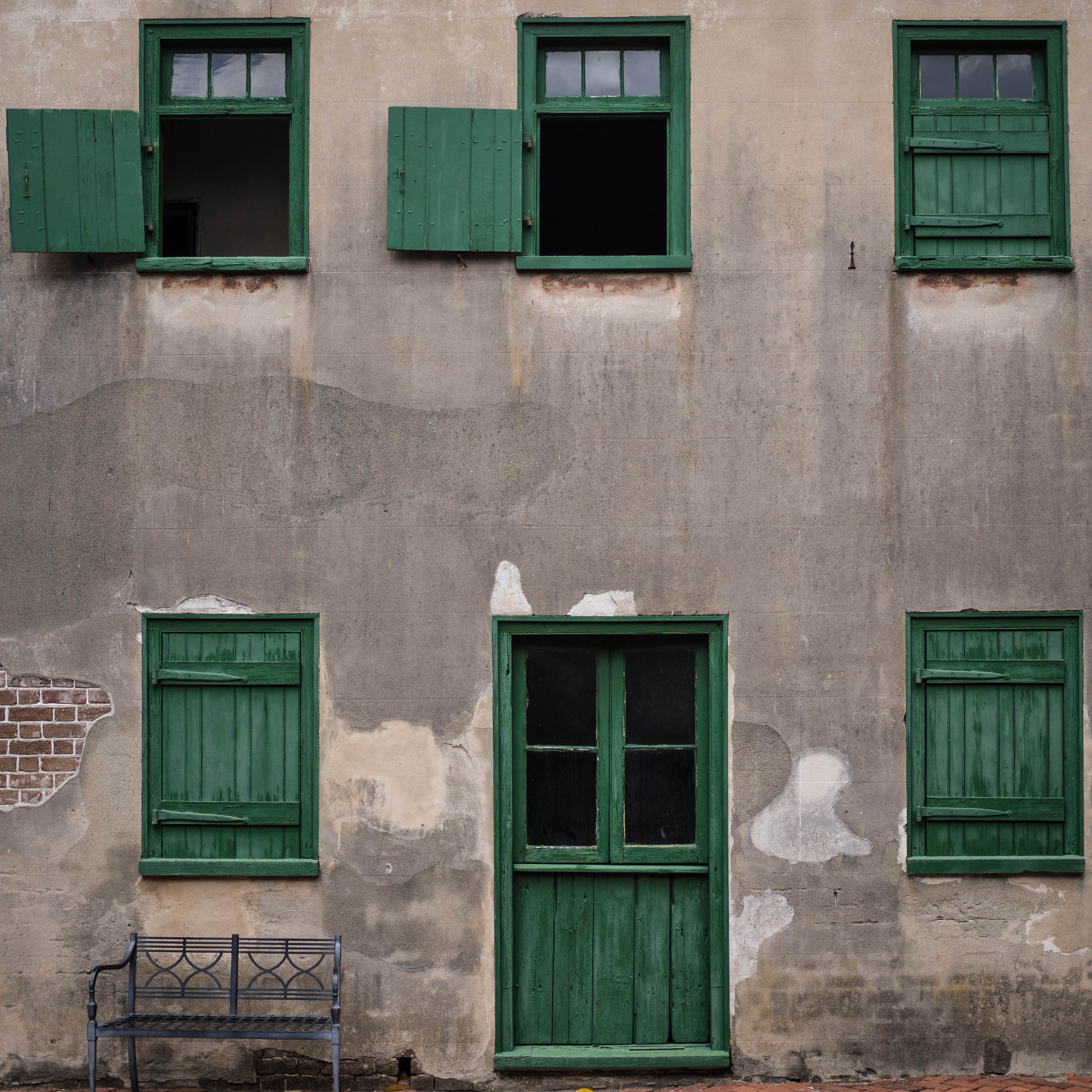
Urban slave quarters at the Aiken-Rhett House, Charleston, South Carolina

Lacking the self-limiting isolation of the plantation, urban slave quarters nonetheless existed within a system designed to preclude insurrection and protect the race-caste system that underpinned the municipal economy. Urban slave quarters ranged from in quality from sturdy masonry barracks to rickety wooden shacks. Observers of urban compounds in Wilmington, North Carolina and Charleston, South Carolina noted that the slave quarters were typically at the back of the property, adjacent to a work yard, all surrounded by barrier walls. High walls were particularly common toward the rear property line and were likely intended to limit unsupervised entrance and egress by the enslaved. Urban slave quarters were often mixed-use blocks that combined residential space for the enslaved with laundries, privies, stables, and similar workspaces. In 19th century Charleston a typical arrangement would be a first floor with a laundry room and a kitchen, each with separate fires and chimneys, separated by a central stairway leading up to slave residences on the second floor. In other cases the upstairs living space was set above a carriage house or a shop. Many urban slave quarters were preserved after Emancipation because they served as still-useful servants' quarters, guest quarters, store rooms, etc.

The Encyclopedia of Louisville (2014) described slave quarters in the border-state city: "Generally, urban slaves' quarters were connected to their owners' property, usually in 'servant's rooms.' A typical newspaper ad from this period described a brick house for sale as having eleven rooms, two passages, a large kitchen, three servants' rooms, and a washhouse. Sometimes advertisements of this nature made it clear that the servants' rooms were in an outbuilding. In most cases, outbuildings were located behind the main house, on the alley. This is significant when coupled with the fact that most city lots, as evidenced by newspaper ads, were long and narrow. Thus, the white population was housed on the street side while their servants were relegated to the alley side of city lots."

== "Free state" slave quarters ==
Slave quarters existed in northern states (in what would become the Union contra the southern Confederacy during the American Civil War), but they were less common and few have been preserved. Surviving examples of "free state" slave quarters exist at the Isaac Royall House in Medford, Massachusetts, and at the Lott House in Brooklyn. Ruins of dwellings may exist at Oak Ridge Park in New Jersey.

== Scholarship and preservation ==
Former slave quarters are valuable resources for archaeologists studying daily life under slavery and expressions of cultural identity amongst the enslaved.

The still-extant Historical American Buildings Survey, originally established as a New Deal work-relief program, created an important photographic and documentary record of 485 slave houses. Current surveys of this historically significant building form include the Alabama Black Belt Slave Housing Survey; the Virginia Slave House Project; Joseph McGill's Sleeping With the Ancestors Project out of Charleston, South Carolina; and architect Jobie Hill's Slave Dwelling Database. Types of nails used, the thickness of any surviving glass, and the techniques used to saw lumber are used to date antebellum structures that may have been slave quarters.

There is significant variation in how historic sites interpret former slave quarters for visitors.

== Additional images ==
Slave quarters of the United States
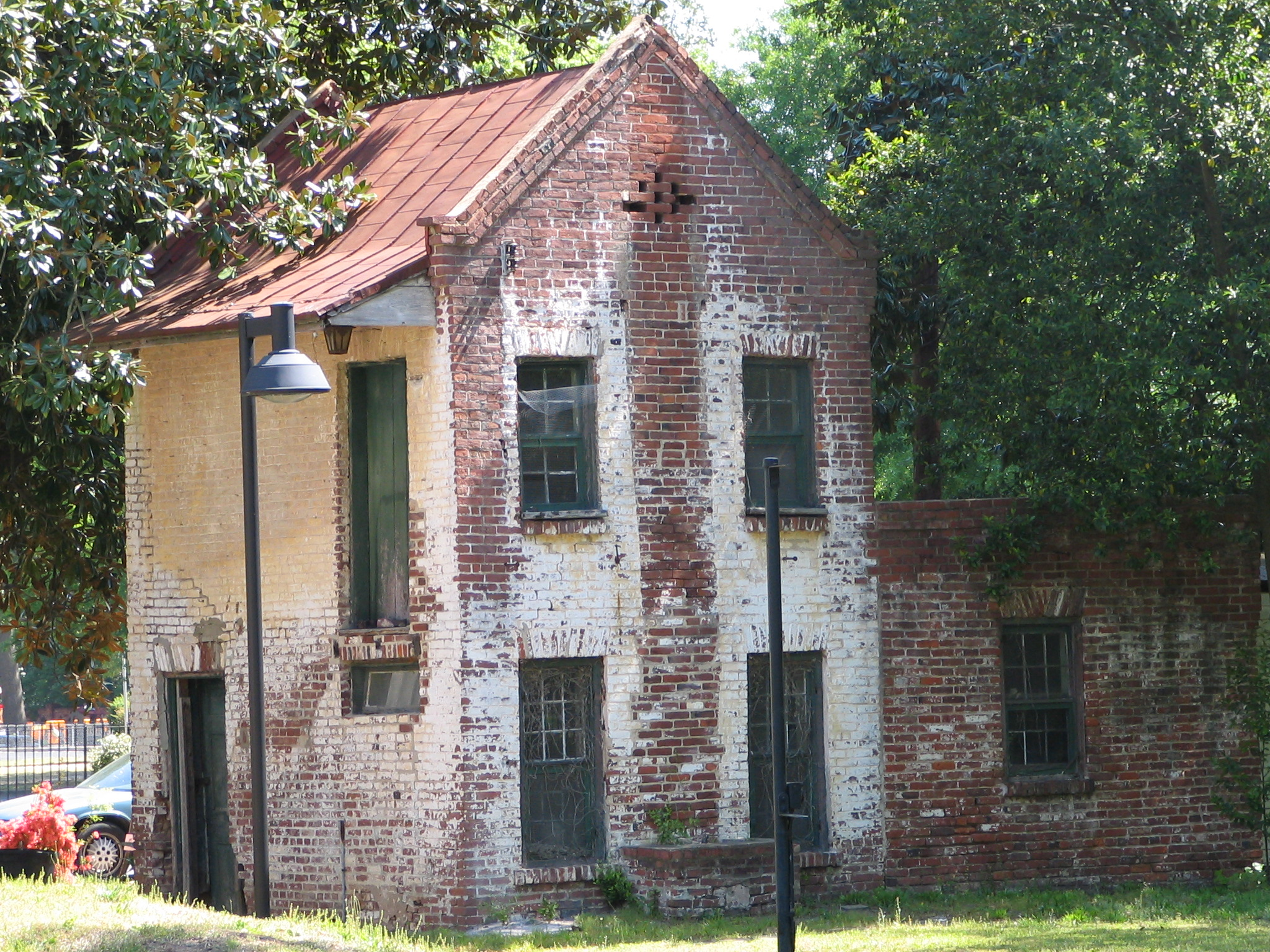
Building said to be "old slave quarters" Appleby Library, Augusta-Richmond County Public Library System

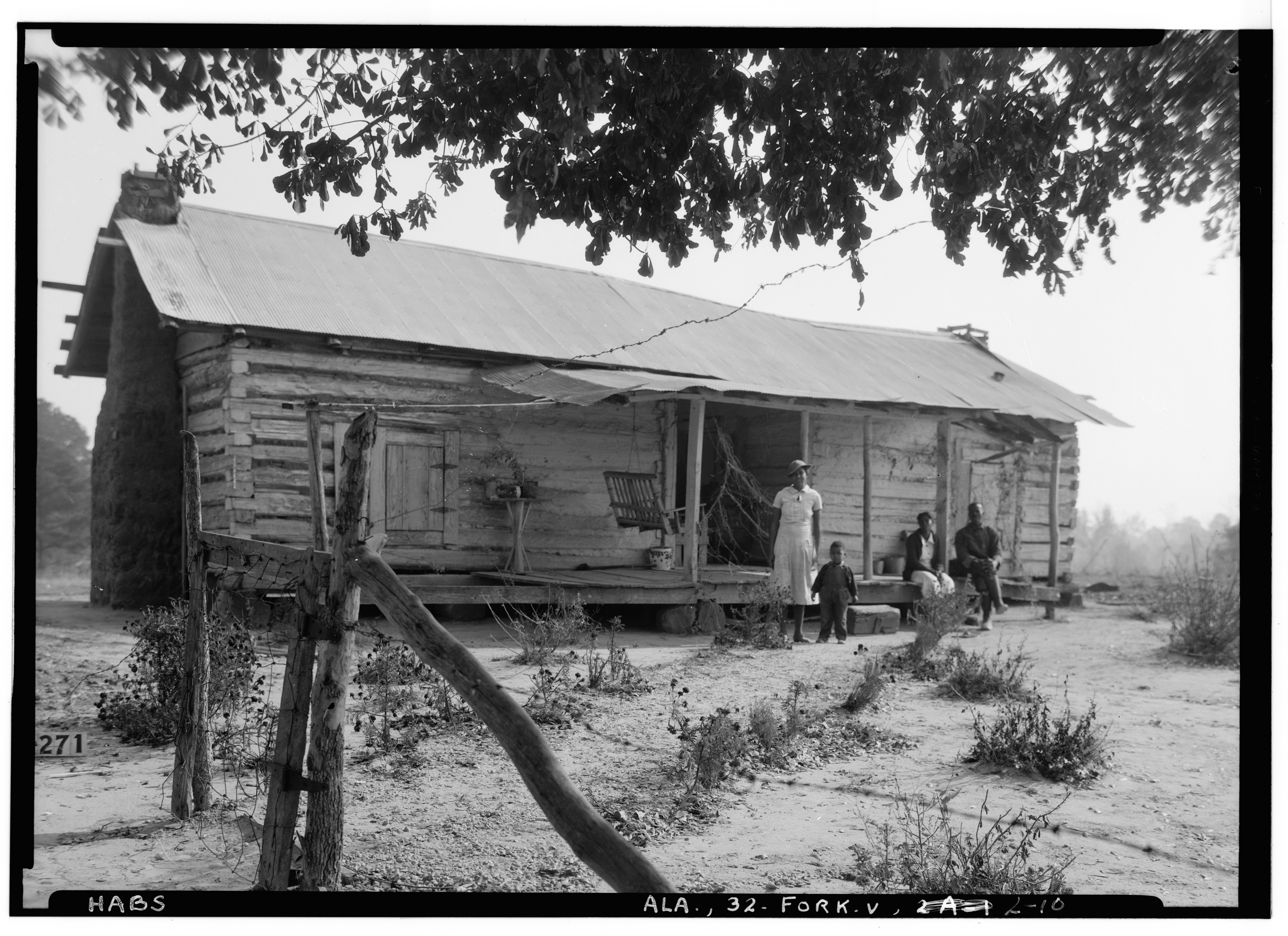
Front view of "old slave house" at Strawberry Hill Plantation, Forkland, Alabama

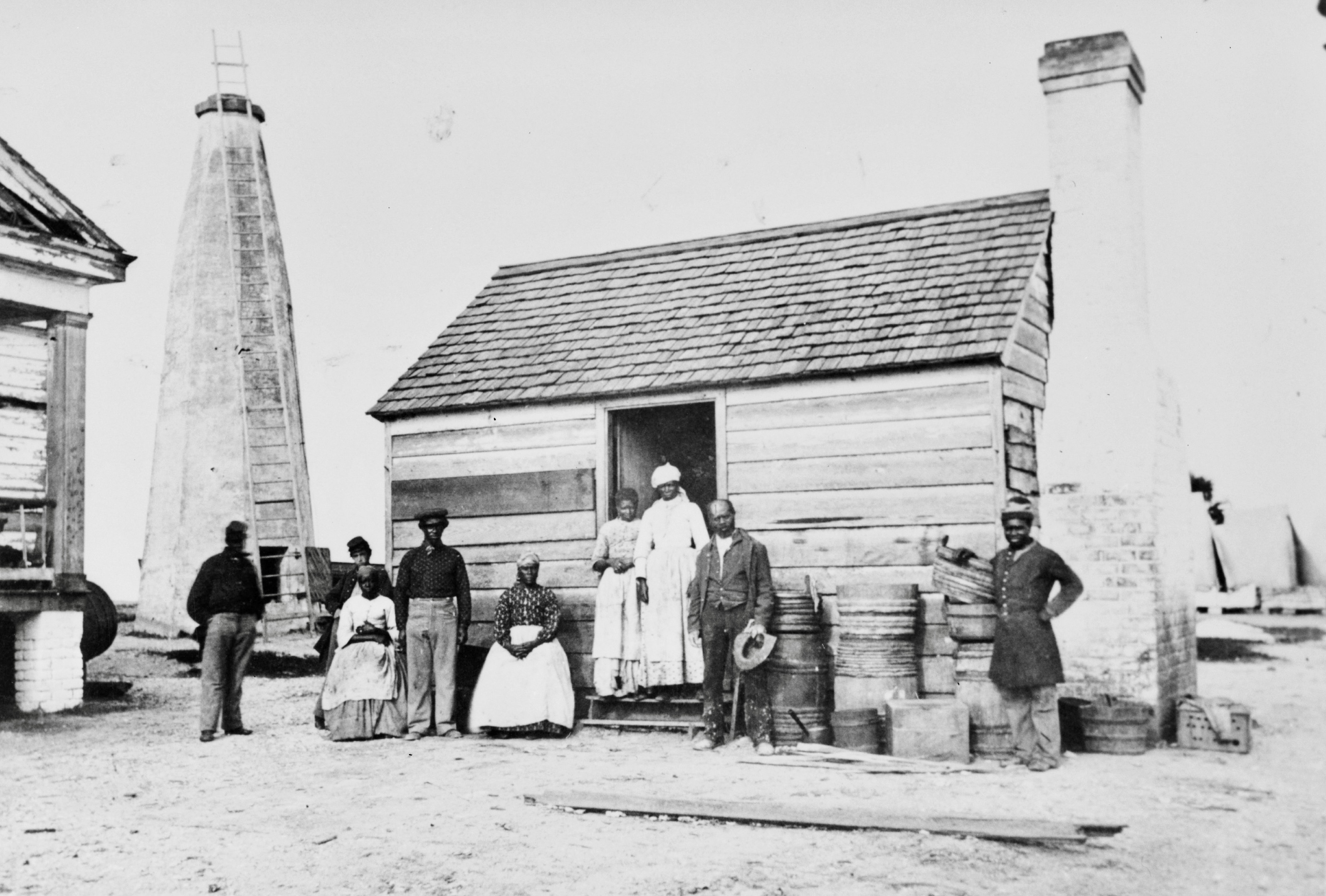
Beacon Tower and "negro cabin", Cockspur Island, Georgia, photographed 1863

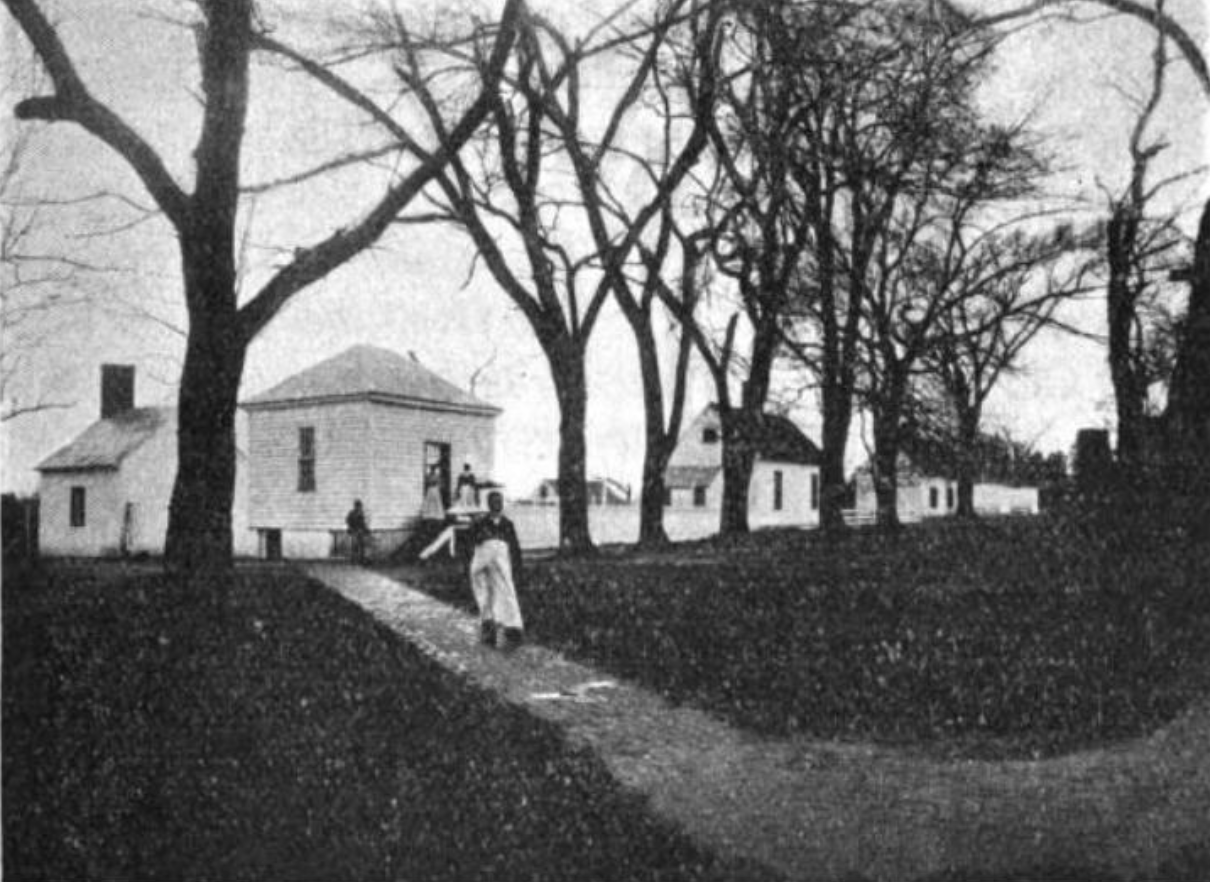
Slave quarters at Tuckahoe Plantation, Virginia, photographed 1914

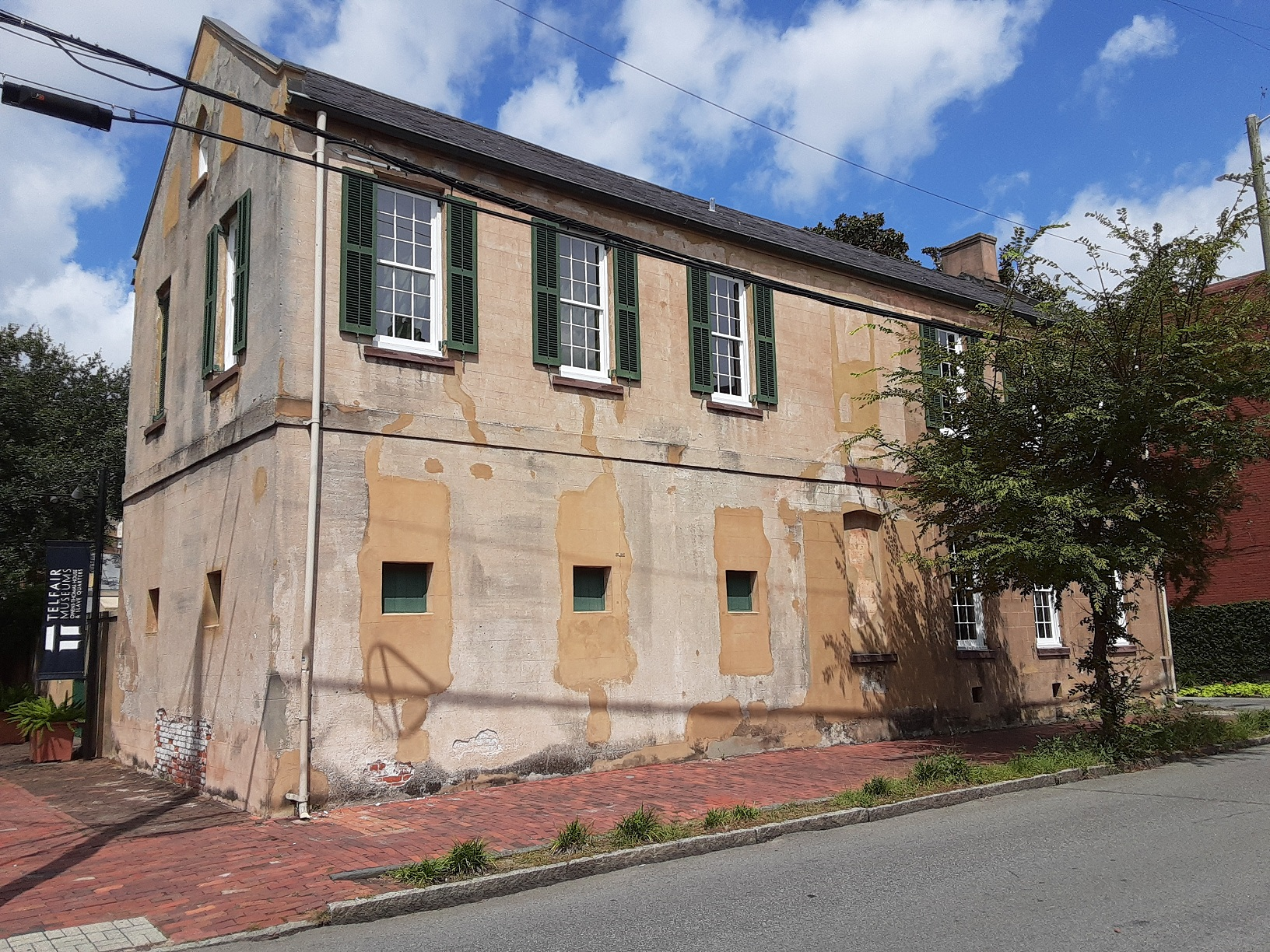
Slave quarters of the Owens-Thomas House, Savannah, Georgia

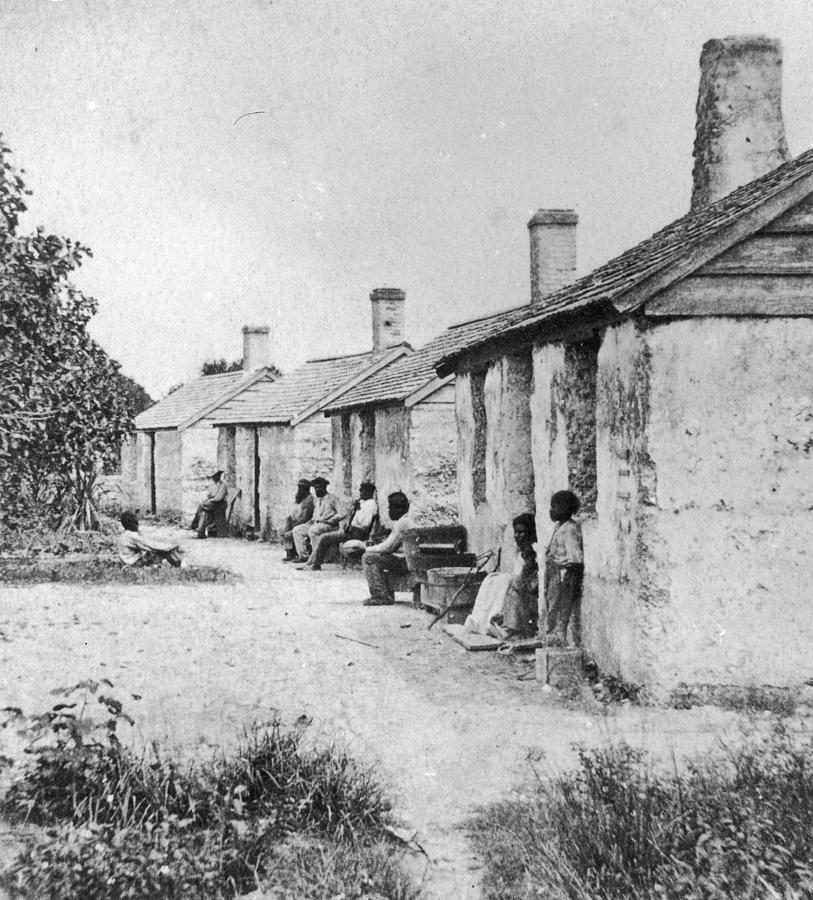
Slave quarters made of tabby concrete, Kingsley Plantation, Fort George Island, Florida, photographed 1865

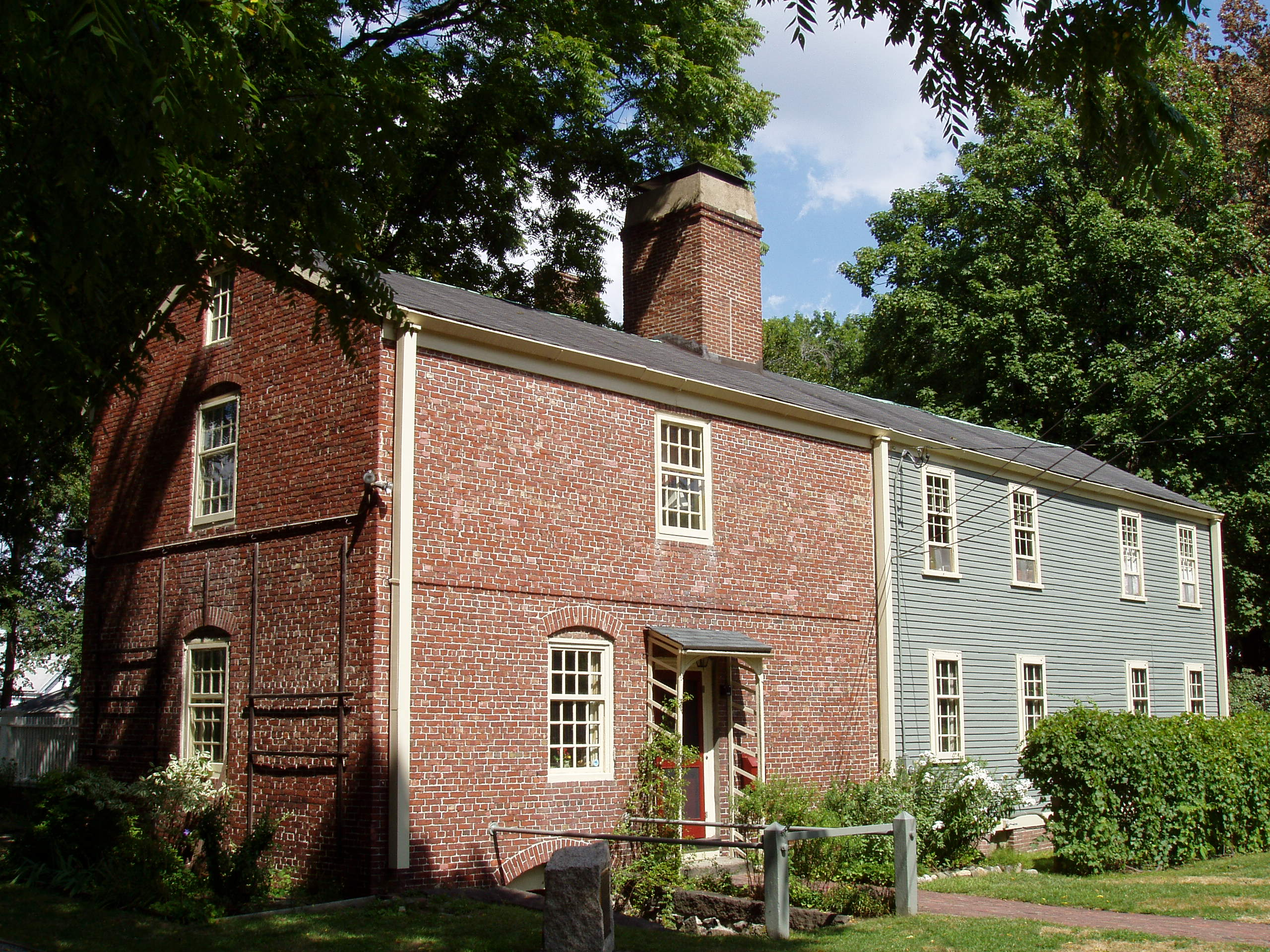
Royall House slave quarters in Massachusetts, constructed 1732

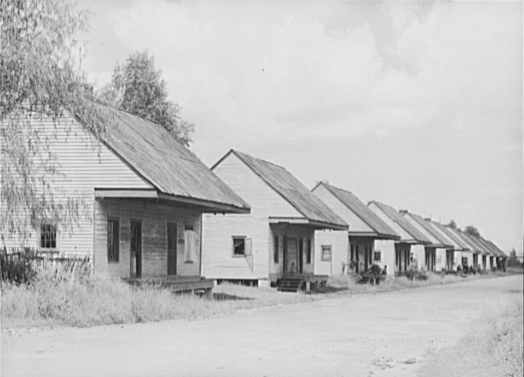
"Row of Negro Cabins", Destrehan, Louisiana, photographed 1938

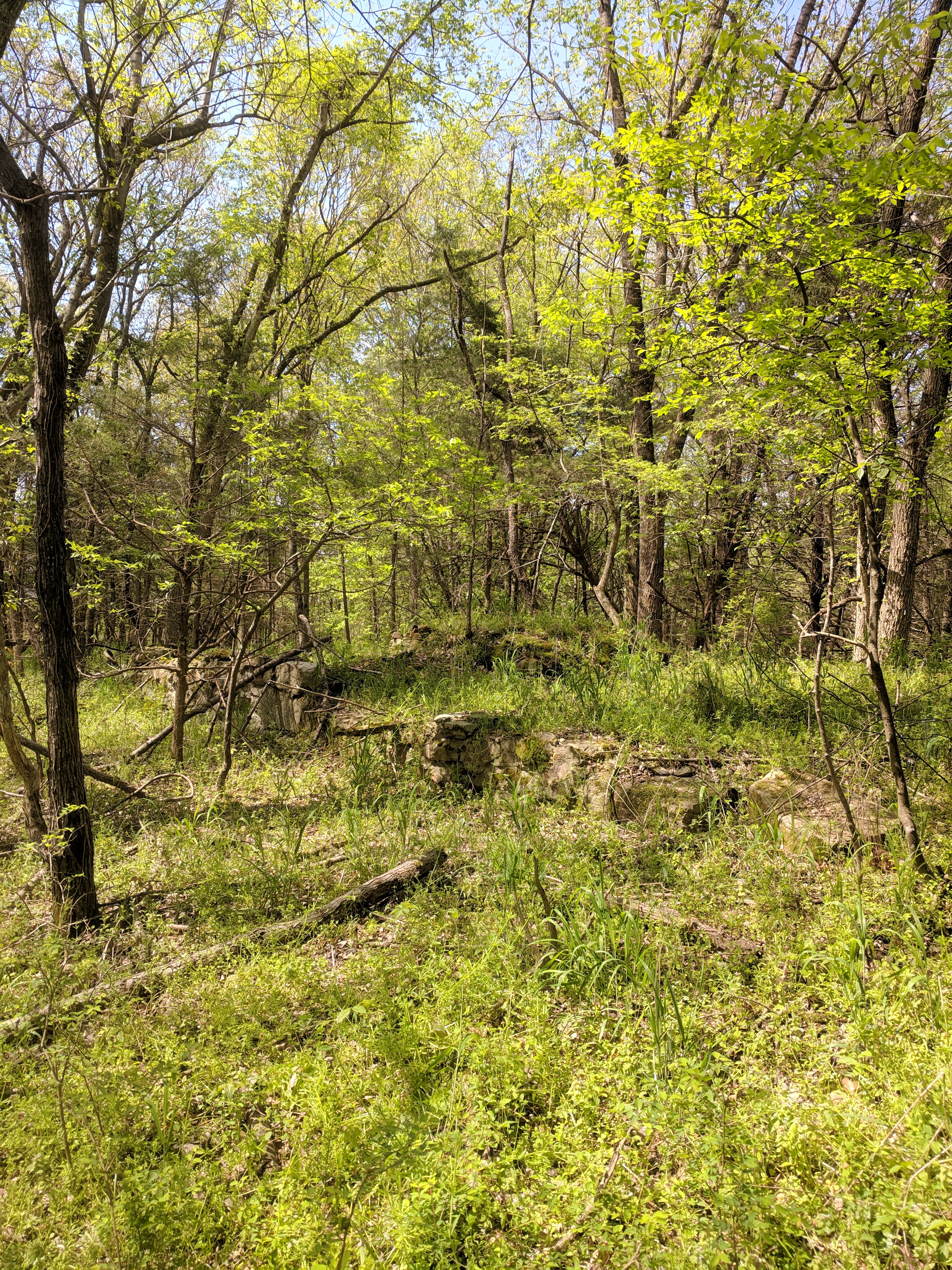
Foundation of a ruined slave cabin, Bolling Island Plantation, Goochland, Virginia

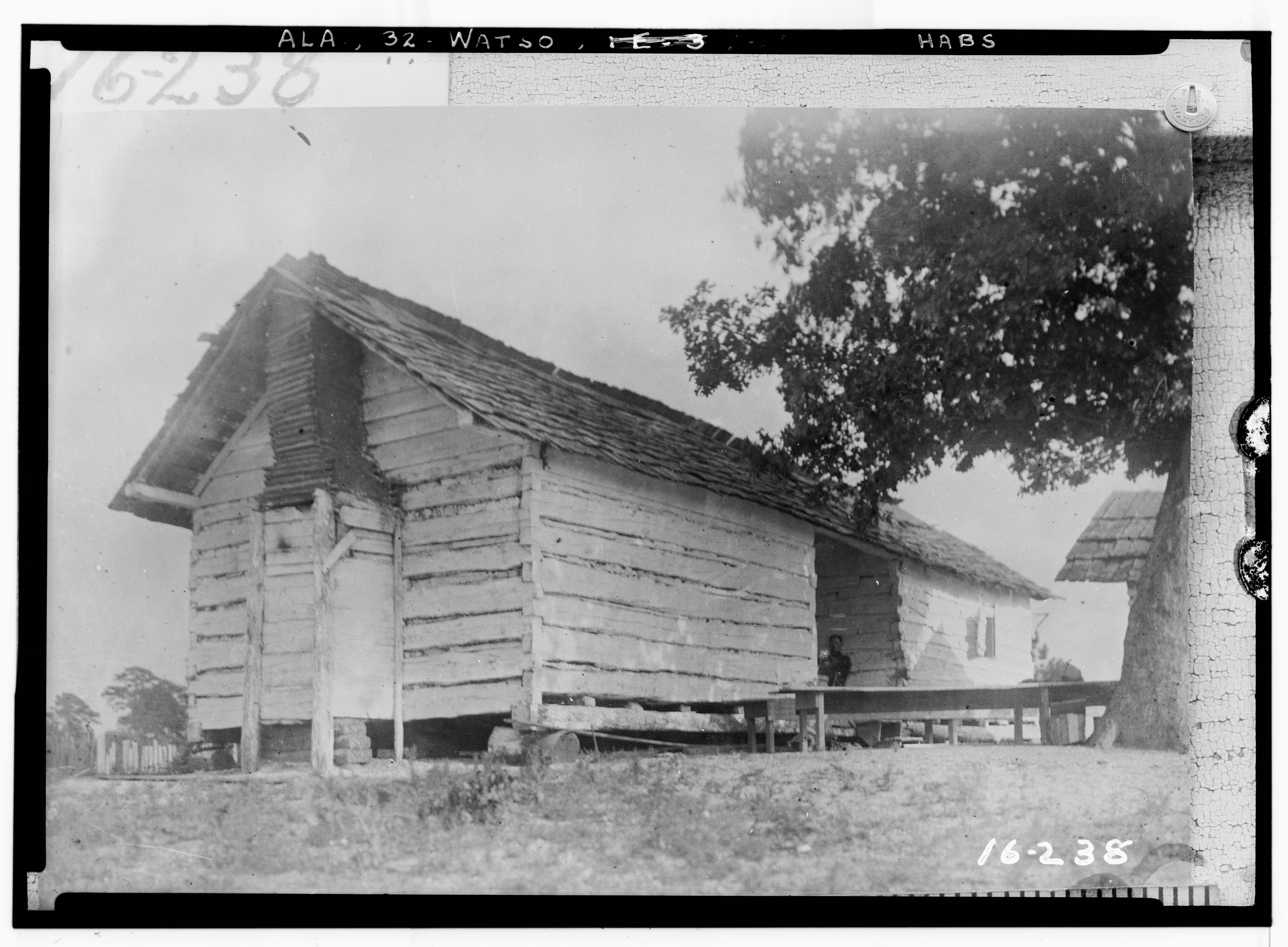
"Dogtrot house" slave quarters, Thornhill Plantation, Greene County, Alabama, photographed 1938

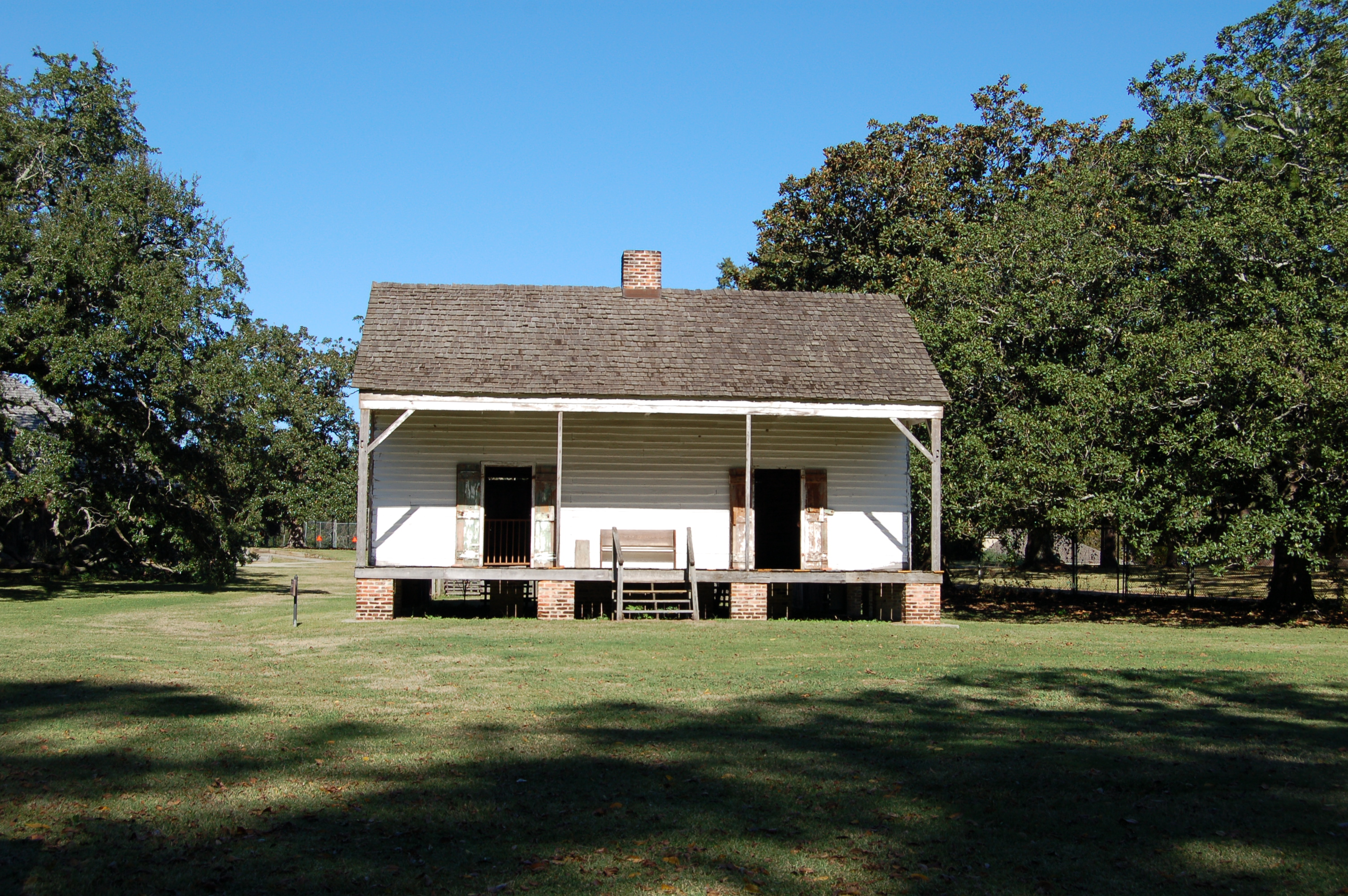
Cherie Quarters Cabins, Pointe Coupee Parish, Louisiana

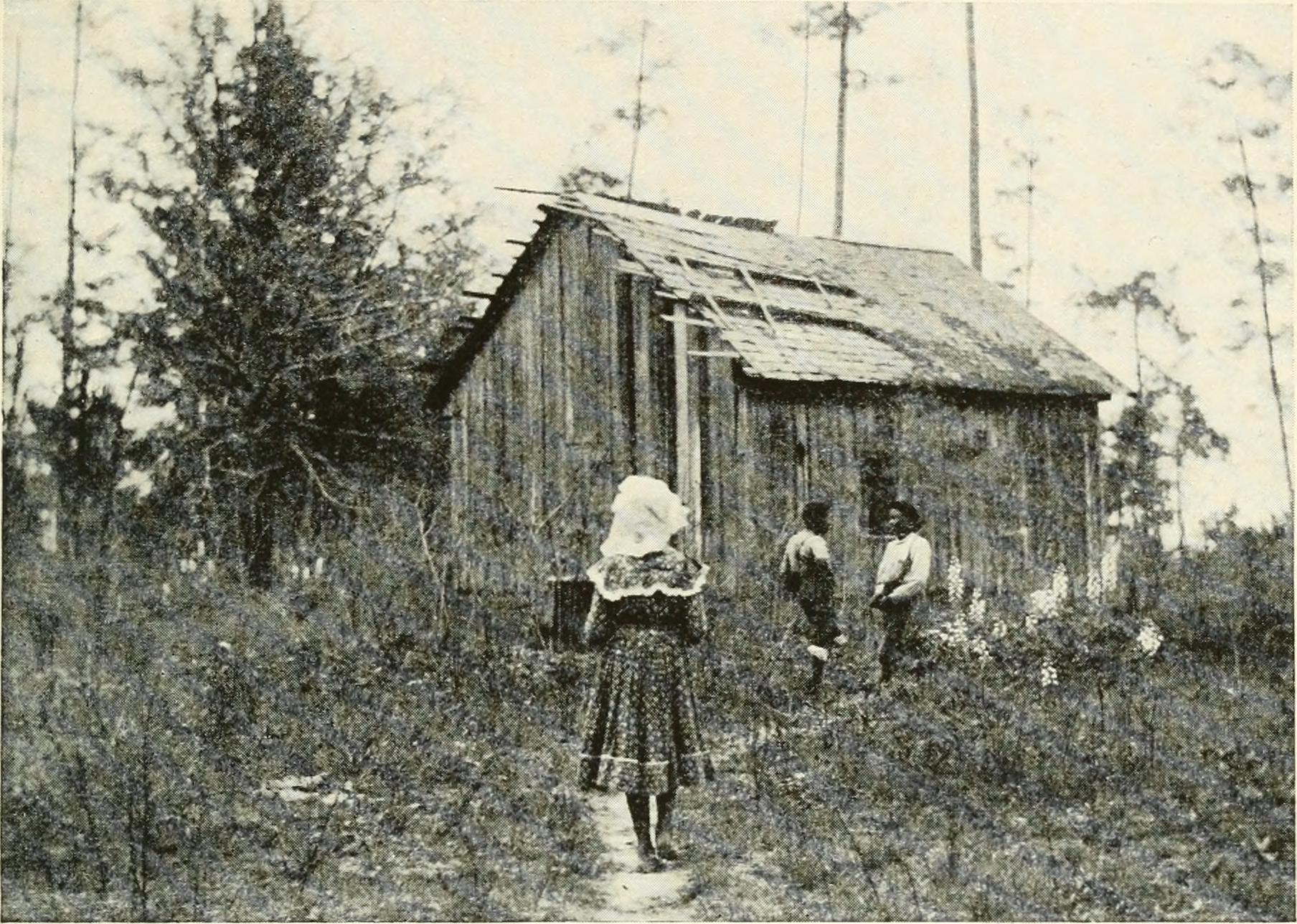
"Colored People's Schoolhouse", near Suwanee River, photographed 1904

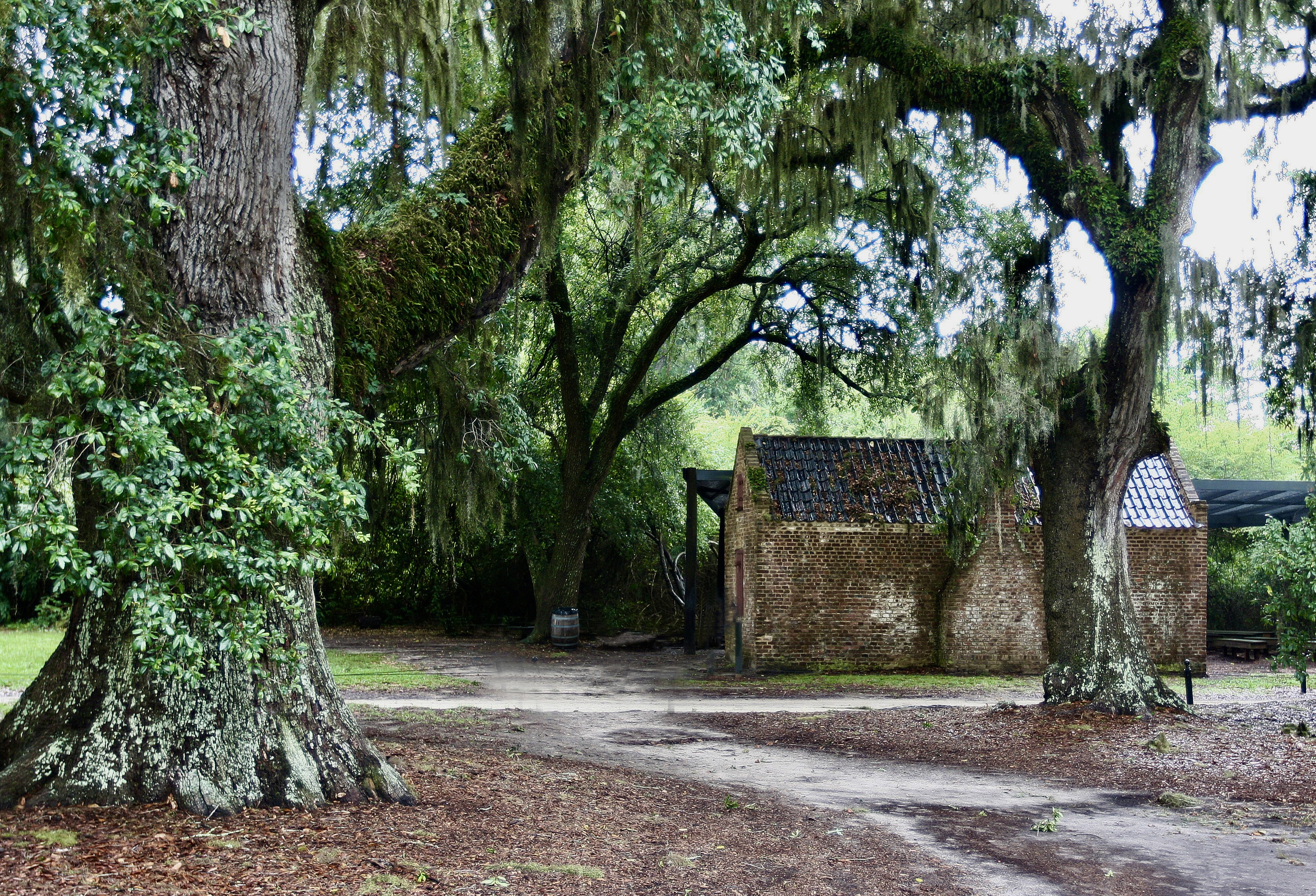
Slave cabin at Boone Hall Plantation, Mount Pleasant, South Carolina

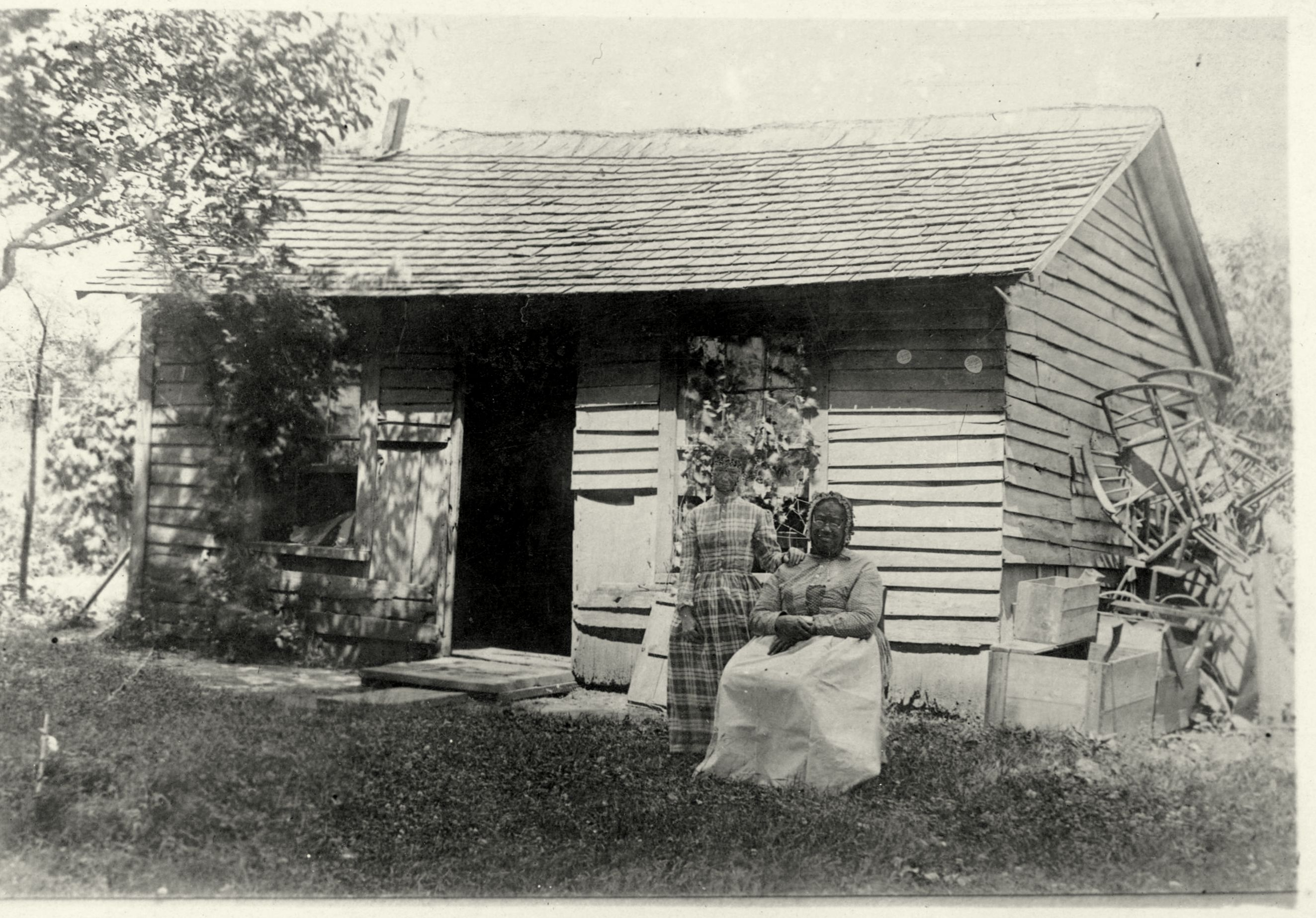
Slave cabin, location unknown

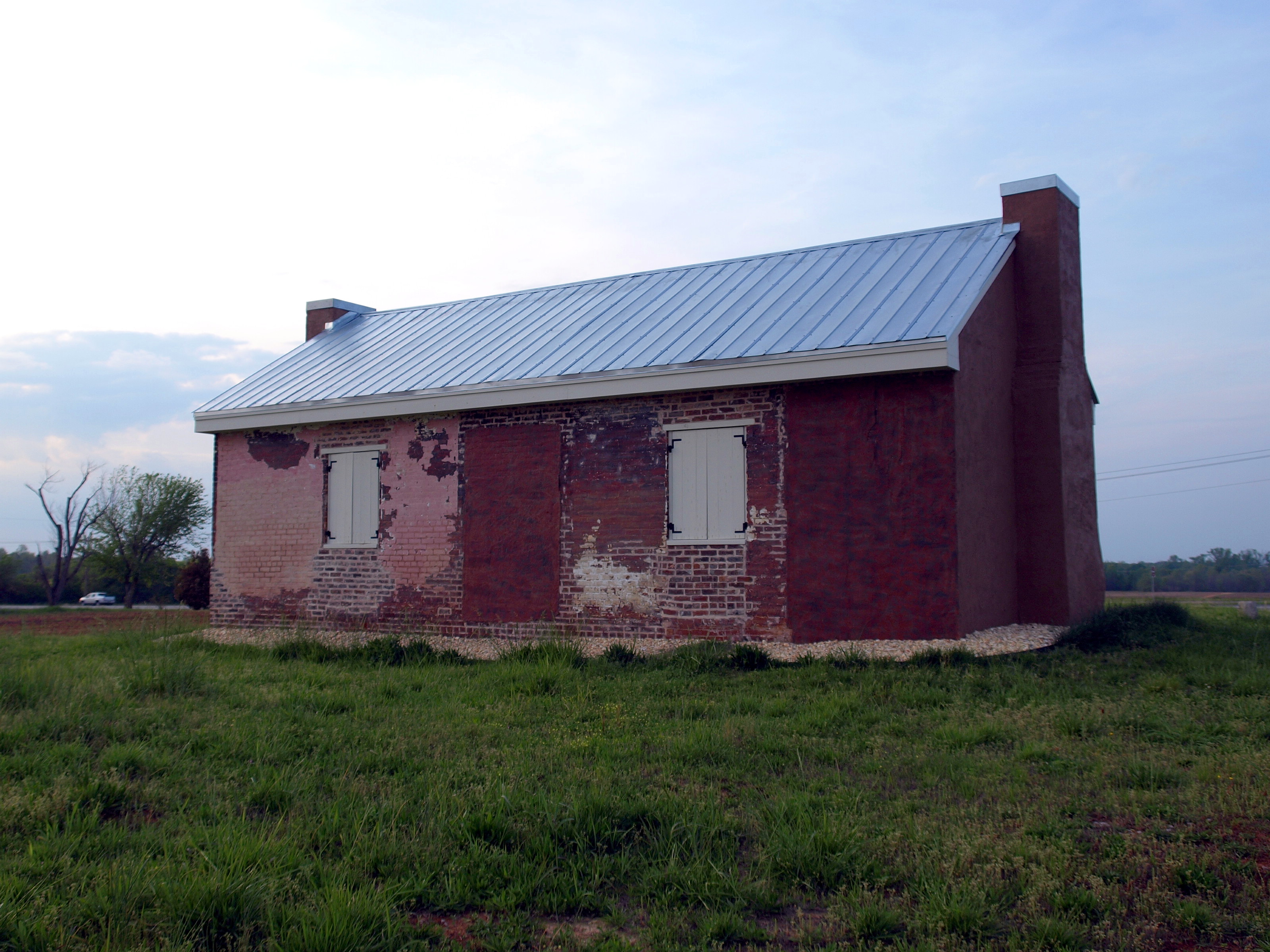
Boxwood Plantation Slave Quarter, near Trinity, Alabama

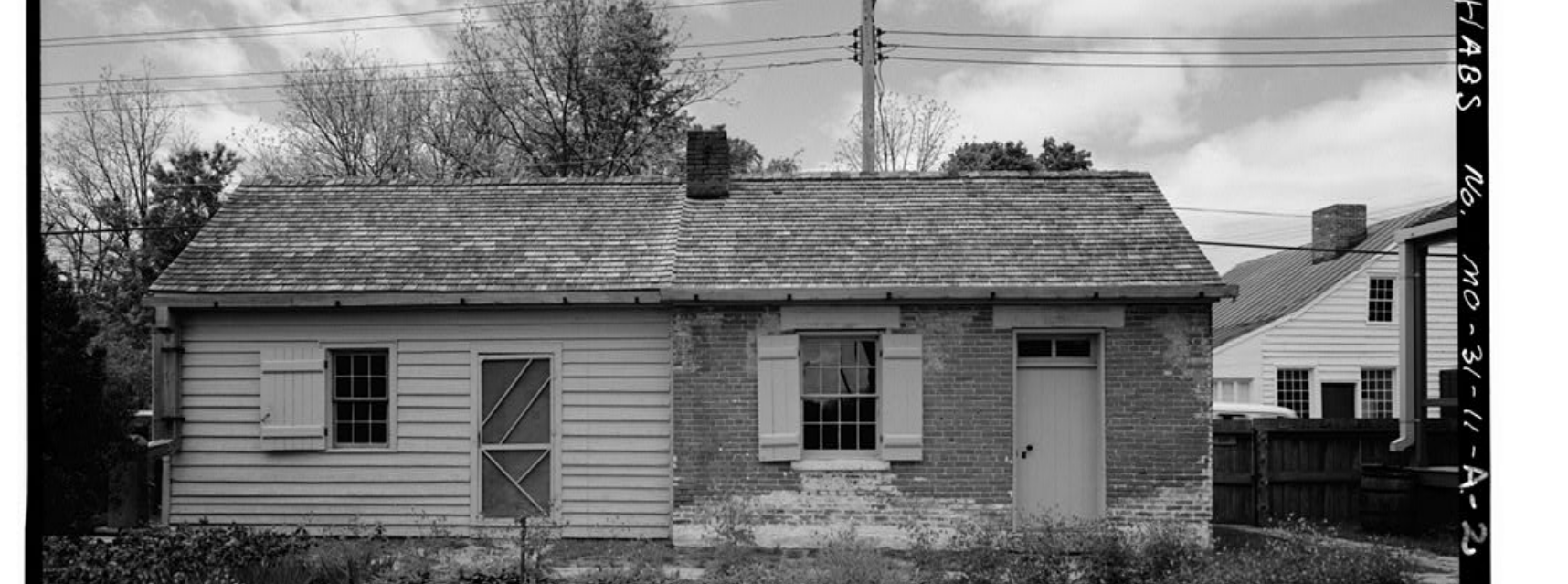
Slave quarters at Felix Vallé House State Historic Site, Ste. Genevieve, Missouri

== See also ==
- List of slave cabins and quarters § United States
- Slave pen
- List of slave owners
- Treatment of slaves in the United States
- Female slavery in the United States
- Invisible churches
- Praise house
- Pan toting
- Chesapeake pipes
- Face jugs § America
