= J. C. Harrington =

American archaeologist

Jean Carl Harrington
- Born: October 25, 1901; Millbrook, Michigan
- Died: April 19, 1998 (aged 96); Richmond, Virginia
- Other names: Jean Carl Harrington, "Pinky" Harrington
- Education: University of Michigan
- Known for: Contributions to American archaeology

Jean Carl Harrington (October 25, 1901 – April 19, 1998) was an American archaeologist best known for his work at Jamestown, Virginia and his contributions to the methodology of historical archaeology. He has been called the "father of historical archaeology in America".

== Nicknames ==
Born Jean Carl, Harrington later went by J. C. Harrington or "Pinky." As he said in an autobiography written for his family, "My first name has been a nuisance and annoyance all my life." On Harrington's birth certificate, for example, he was listed as female, which he later corrected.

While studying at the University of Chicago, Harrington received the nickname "Pinky" for his red hair and the bright shade of pink he turned when exposed to the sun. He would be known to his friends and colleagues as "Pinky" from graduate school onward.

== Biography ==
=== Early life ===
Harrington was born in Millbrook, Michigan. His mother who was named Patricia and father named Edwards were both teachers, though his father later became a school superintendent. This led Harrington's family to relocate to a series of small Michigan towns, including Scottville, Ypsilanti, Vasser, and Albion, during his youth.

=== Education ===
Named "Most Likely to Keep Busy" by his high school annual, Harrington, following his graduation, completed a two-year pre-engineering program at Albion College while working a series of jobs. He then attended the Massachusetts Institute of Technology (MIT) in Boston, where he took courses in the architectural school for a year. Harrington completed his bachelor's degree in architectural engineering at the University of Michigan in 1924.

The University of Michigan's architectural engineering program required students to complete an internship or architecture-related research project. To meet this requirement, Harrington spent the summer of 1923 with the School for American Research in Santa Fe, New Mexico, creating measured plan drawings of Spanish mission churches. During the project, Harrington met archaeologist Edgar Lee Hewett and his excavation crew at the Gran Quivira ruins. There Harrington's interest in archaeology began to develop.

Harrington returned to New Mexico following his graduation, taking a job with the New Mexico Highway Department and later a mining company. While there, Harrington visited a number of archaeological sites, including Alfred V. Kidder's excavations at what is now Pecos National Historical Park near Pecos, New Mexico. Following his sister's death, Harrington returned east, taking a position with an architect in South Bend, Indiana until it dissolved in 1932. The Great Depression led Harrington to reconsider his career path, and he enrolled as a graduate student in archaeology at the University of Chicago.

While at the University of Chicago, Harrington joined an expedition conducting a site survey across the Yucatán Peninsula, funded by the Carnegie Institution of Washington. By 1935, Harrington had completed the requirements for a master's degree. Though he passed his written examination for a doctoral degree in 1936, Harrington never wrote a dissertation.

=== Career ===
Harrington's background in both architecture and archaeology made him a prime candidate to mediate conflicts that had developed between archaeologists and architects during the National Park Service's excavations at Jamestown, Virginia. Approached by the National Park Service in 1936, Harrington was reluctant to take the position, noting that he was not interested in working for the government or in excavating a site that, archaeologically speaking, was quite young. When the Park Service sent him a form asking about the minimum salary he would accept, Harrington asked for "$600 more than he thought he would ever earn." He was offered a position at this salary, and he accepted.

While working at Jamestown, Harrington married Virginia Hall Sutton, the first female Ranger ever hired by the National Park Service. Also a student from the University of Chicago, Sutton began as a Ranger Historian at Jamestown in 1937. They married in 1938, and throughout their marriage they worked together on archaeological projects. The Harringtons' first project was to remove the fences sealing the Jamestown excavations from the public and to begin public tours of the site.

Harrington completed a report of his work at the May-Hartwell site in 1938, but it was not until 1950 that any of his reports of the Jamestown excavations would be published. This was because the National Park Service envisioned their function as one of preservation and interpretation rather than research. To combat this, the Harringtons and other National Park Service employees founded the Eastern National Park and Monument Association in 1948, which published a number of Pinky's archaeological reports. It also provided funding for publishing postcards and pamphlets detailing the history and archaeology of National Parks and Monuments.

The excavations at Jamestown continued until World War II, when Harrington was made Acting Park Superintendent of Colonial Park. He held this position until 1946, when he went on to become the Eastern Regional Archaeologist for the National Park Service's southeast region in Richmond, Virginia. The projects Harrington managed during his career with the National Park Service included the Jamestown Glass Works, Appomattox Court House, Fort Raleigh in North Carolina, and George Washington's Fort Necessity in Pennsylvania.

Harrington retired from his career with the National Park Service in 1965. The Harringtons continued to take part in archaeological work, however, excavating several sites in Nauvoo, Illinois for the Church of Jesus Christ of Latter-day Saints and sites on West Point Military Academy's Constitution Island. They also traveled extensively to visit international archaeological and historical sites.

== Scholarship ==
Harrington contributed largely to the development and legitimization of historical archaeology as a discipline. He published the first summary of the field in 1952 in Archaeology of Eastern United States (edited by J. B. Griffin, pp. 335–344), entitled "Historic Site Archaeology in the United States." This was followed by "Archaeology as an Auxiliary Science to American History," published in American Anthropologist in 1955 (57(6, pt. 1):1121-1130), which examined the contributions historical archaeology could make to understanding the recent past. Harrington also published a booklet for the Society for State and Local History, Archaeology and the Historical Society, in 1965. This publication addressed an audience outside the field of archaeology, giving an idea of the types of questions that historical archaeology could address to augment historical research.

Both Pinky and Virginia Harrington were involved in the organization of the Society for Historical Archaeology, beginning with its first meeting in 1967.

In addition, Harrington's article "Dating Stem Fragments of Seventeenth and Eighteenth Century Clay Tobacco Pipes," published by the Archaeological Society of Virginia in 1954 (Quarterly Bulletin of the Archaeological Society of Virginia 9(1):10-14), presented a series of histograms that showed bore diameters of pipe stems decreasing over time. This data, converted into a regression formula by Lewis Binford, is still used to date pipe stem fragments.

== Accolades ==
In, 1952 Harrington received the Citation for Distinguished Service from the United States Secretary of the Interior, an award usually given to high-ranking government officials or as a posthumous recognition of major contributions.

In 1981, the Harringtons created the J.C. Harrington Medal, the Society for Historical Archaeology's award recognizing scholastic contributions to the discipline. Pinky Harrington received the first medal at the society's 1982 annual meeting in Philadelphia, and it has been presented yearly since. Other recipients have included John L. Cotter (1984), Edward B. Jelks (1988), and James Deetz (1997).

== See also ==
- Ivor Noël Hume
