= Edward B. Jelks =

American archaeologist (1922–2021)

- Born: September 10, 1922; Macon, Georgia
- Died: December 22, 2021 (aged 99); Denver, Colorado
- Known for: Contributions to American archaeology

Edward Baker Jelks (September 10, 1922 – December 22, 2021) was an American archaeologist trained as a prehistorian yet known for his contributions to historical archaeology and leadership roles in multiple anthropological organizations, including the Society for Historical Archaeology and the Society of Professional Archaeologists.

== Early life ==
Born in Macon, Georgia on September 10, 1922, Jelks spent his early years (1923–1930) in the Hollywood, Florida area. He moved to Texas in 1930, where he made his home until moving to Illinois in 1968.

== Education ==
Jelks entered the University of Texas at Austin in fall 1939. He began his academic career as a pre-med zoology major, but the Japanese attack on Pearl Harbor led Jelks to enlist. He joined the Navy Hospital Corp as Hospital Apprentice First Class and was stationed in Guadalcanal, where he helped to develop a field hospital for invading American troops. After contracting malaria, Jelks was sent to a Navy hospital in Auckland, New Zealand, where he applied for Officers Training. Jelks completed Officers School and was sent to Oklahoma A & M (now Oklahoma State) to learn Japanese. The war ended shortly thereafter, and Jelks returned to the University of Texas to continue his education under the GI bill.

Jelks completed a Bachelor of Arts in English (his pre-war minor) and continued to work toward a Master of Arts (MA) in anthropology. There his coursework focused on North American archaeology and prehistory, specifically that of Texas. In 1950, Jelks, having fulfilled the requirements for the MA program except his thesis, was hired by Robert Stephenson as his assistant in the River Basin Surveys program. Jelks completed his thesis and received his MA in 1952.

Jelks later returned from archaeological fieldwork to the University of Texas at Austin and earned a Ph.D. in archaeology in 1965. Familiar with the direct historical approach, Jelks minored in history while completing his Ph.D., interested largely in the location of Spanish colonial sites in Texas. Jelks also directed the Texas Archaeological Research Laboratory at the University of Texas from 1958–1965.

== Archaeological career ==
Jelks began his archaeological career in Texas directing the River Basin Surveys (1951–1965). He was hired by Robert Stephenson, and when Stephenson returned to the University of Michigan in 1951, Jelks took over his position as director of the River Basin Surveys program in Texas. The River Basin Survey conducted excavations at both prehistoric and historic sites throughout Texas.

One of Jelks' primary interests in Texas archaeology was the location of 17th and 18th-century villages of the southern Wichita tribes, as well as the location of Spanish colonial sites. Excavations at the Stansbury Site in Hill County, Texas led Jelks to conduct library research to identify trade goods that were found. This process, one of looking for documented historic sites and locating them in the field, began to characterize Jelks' research.

Between 1954 and 1956, Jelks worked at Jamestown, Virginia as John L. Cotter's assistant. This was where Jelks met J. C. "Pinky" Harrington, a leader in the development of a methodology for historical archaeology. During the summer of 1955, Jelks was sent to conduct excavations at the Yorktown Battlefield.

After completing his Ph.D., Jelks was offered a position teaching the archaeology of Texas in the newly created anthropology department at Southern Methodist University. Jelks was hired as an associate professor, a position he held from September 1965 to 1968, and he taught both Texas prehistory and a graduate seminar in historical archaeology.

While teaching at Southern Methodist University, Jelks spent his summers working as an archaeologist for Parks Canada, excavating British artifacts of the early to mid-19th century at Signal Hill, Newfoundland. He began this project in summer 1965 and returned in summer 1966.

Between 1966 and 1967, Jelks was instrumental in founding the Society for Historical Archaeology. At the meeting of the Central States Anthropological Society in St. Louis in 1966, Jelks invited archaeologists interested in historical archeology to Southern Methodist University to discuss organizing a society around their common interest. While planning for this meeting, Jelks and fellow attendees, including John L. Cotter, assembled a "Committee of Fifteen," a group of fifteen leading practitioners in historical archaeology. This committee, along with nearly one hundred others, attended the first "International Conference on Historical Archaeology," held in Dallas, Texas from January 6–7, 1967. The conference drew a total of 112 attendees, with presentation of seventeen papers by scholars including Charles Cleland, James Deetz, Bernard Fontana, J.C. Harrington, and Roderick Sprague. Out of this meeting, the Society for Historical Archaeology (SHA) emerged. The SHA was officially incorporated on April 1, 1968, in Bethlehem, Pennsylvania, and John L. Cotter was elected to serve as its first president. Jelks served as its second president in 1968.

In 1968, Jelks left Texas for a teaching position at Illinois State University. There he organized an anthropology curriculum and taught undergraduate and graduate courses in archaeology, including a seminar in historical archaeology. He continued to involve students in archaeological work, particularly research involving French explorer La Salle's colonizing efforts. Jelks carried out exploratory excavations at the first location of La Salle's Fort St. Louis (1680) at Starved Rock, Illinois but failed to locate the site of La Salle's later Fort St. Louis near Peoria. In 1983, Jelks and ISU history professor Carl Ekberg did identify the first site of the French Fort de Chatres, built along the Mississippi River in southern Illinois in 1719.

Jelks also conducted excavations on Constitution Island for the United States Military Academy at West Point, New York in 1971. West Point hoped to use archaeological data as a basis for restoring Revolutionary War period fortifications in honor of the approaching United States Bicentennial celebration. Jelks organized the project as a field school, allowing students to take part in the contracted work while earning course credit.

With the rise of cultural resource management (CRM) work, it became clear that organizations looking to contract with archaeologists had no manner of recognizing who was qualified to do professional work. Jelks and colleague Bob McGimsey were approached by the chief archaeologist of the National Park Service, Rex Wilson, at a Society for American Archaeology (SAA) conference in the early 1970s with a warning: If the profession would not certify qualified archaeologists, the government would do it instead. This frightened a number of archaeologists and led to the Airlie House Conference of 1974, sponsored by the Society for American Archaeology and financed by the National Park Service. At this conference, an SAA committee was appointed that would eventually form the Society of Professional Archaeologists (SOPA). Jelks chaired the final committee that met at the University of Arkansas in January 1976, electing officers for the new organization. Jelks, elected as SOPA's first president, then presented at the SAA annual meeting in spring 1976, urging members to join the new registry. SOPA was eventually replaced by the Register of Professional Archaeologists (RPA).

Jelks' other fieldwork of note included excavations at the Grand Village of the Kickapoo (late 18th-early 19th century) in McLean County, Illinois, the De Brum copra plantation (early 20th century) at Likiep Atoll in Micronesia, and America's first dude ranch, the Bar-B-C Dude Ranch (established in 1912), in Grand Teton National Park, Wyoming.

== Retirement and death ==
Jelks retired from academic life in 1983. Jelks died in Denver on December 22, 2021, at the age of 99.

== Honors ==
Jelks was honored with the Society for Historical Archaeology's J. C. Harrington Award in 1988 for his contributions to the discipline of historical archaeology.

His other awards and honors include:

- Fellow of the American Association for the Advancement of Science (AAAS)
- U. S. representative to the Pan American Institute of Geography and History (an agency of the Organization of American States)
- Clarence H. Webb Award for Outstanding Contributions to Caddoan Archaeology
- Curtis D. Tunnell Award for Lifetime Achievement in Texas Archaeology
- With John L. Cotter, the Historic Preservation Award of the Association for the Preservation of Virginia Antiquities (now Preservation Virginia)
- Illinois Archaeological Survey's Career Achievement Award
- Society of Professional Archaeologists' (SOPA) Distinguished Service Award
- Register of Professional Archaeologists' (RPA) Distinguished Service Award

== See also ==
- Historical archaeology
- Society for Historical Archaeology
