= Society for Historical Archaeology =

Professional organization in the UK

The Society for Historical Archaeology (SHA) is a professional organization of scholars concerned with the archaeology of the modern world (15th century-present). Founded in 1967, the SHA promotes scholarly research and the dissemination of knowledge pertaining to historical archaeology. The society is specifically interested in the identification, excavation, interpretation, and conservation of sites and materials on land and underwater. It is the largest such organization in the world and the third-largest anthropological organization in the United States.

== Mission ==
According to its Constitution,

The Society for Historical Archaeology shall be an educational not-for-profit organization to promote scholarly research and the dissemination of knowledge concerning historical archaeology; to exchange information in this field; to hold periodic conferences to discuss problems of mutual interest relating to the study of historical archaeology; and to obtain the cooperation of the concerned disciplines for projects of research. The focus shall be the era since the beginning of explorations of the non-European parts of the world by Europeans, with prime concern in the Western Hemisphere. The society may additionally concern itself with European, Oceanic, African, and Asian archaeology having definite bearing upon scholarly problems in the Western Hemisphere.

The SHA’s “Ethical Principles of The Society for Historical Archaeology” provide further guidance to society members, historical archaeologists, and those in allied fields regarding one’s ethical obligations to the archaeological record, colleagues, employers, and the public.

== Formation ==
With the National Historic Preservation Act of 1966 and the United States’ approaching Bicentennial, the mid-twentieth century witnessed a renewed interest in colonial America and a growing scholarly interest in the archaeology of the modern world. These trends encouraged the development of a professional organization devoted to the study and practice of historical archaeology.

At the 1958 Annual Meeting of the American Anthropological Association in Washington, D.C., John L. Cotter chaired a symposium on the Role of Archaeology in Historical Research. Cotter, Edward B. Jelks, Edward Larrabee, and Stanley South subsequently discussed forming a society devoted to historical archaeology. Jelks, following a second such discussion at the meeting of the Central States Anthropological Society in St. Louis in 1966, began to plan an “International Conference on Historical Archaeology." That conference was held January 6–7, 1967, at Southern Methodist University in Dallas, Texas. The conference drew 112 attendees, with 17 papers by scholars including Charles Cleland, James Deetz, Bernard Fontana, J.C. "Pinky" Harrington, and Roderick Sprague. The SHA was officially incorporated on April 1, 1968, in Bethlehem, Pennsylvania, and John Cotter was elected to serve as its first president.

== Publications ==
SHA publishes its peer-reviewed journal Historical Archaeology quarterly with online publication of Book Reviews and Technical Briefs. The SHA reader series, Perspectives from Historical Archaeology, offers subject matter and regional selections of articles published in Historical Archaeology.

The SHA Newsletter is published quarterly in March, June, October, and December. The SHA also maintains a blog where members and non-members read, share, and discuss topics posted by SHA leadership.

== Awards ==
The Society presents several awards, medals and travel stipends yearly, including:

- J. C. Harrington Award in Historical Archaeology – presented for a life-time of contributions to the discipline centered on scholarship.
- John L. Cotter Award – presented each year for outstanding achievement by an individual at the start of his/her career in historical archaeology.
- Daniel G. Roberts Award for Excellence in Public Historical Archaeology – recognizes outstanding accomplishments in public archaeology by individuals, educational institutions, for-profit or non-profit firms or organizations, museums, government agencies, private sponsors or projects.
- SHA Award of Merit – recognizes specific achievements of individuals and organizations that have furthered the cause of historical archaeology.
- James Deetz Book Award – intended to recognize books and monographs that are similarly well written and accessible to all potential readers.

== Meetings ==
After the 1967 conference in Dallas, the Society’s first annual meeting took place in 1968 in Williamsburg, Virginia. The table below shows the meeting locations and dates since 2007.

Meeting	Location	Date
55th	Philadelphia, Pennsylvania	2022
54th	virtual meeting using Zoom	2021
53rd	Boston, Massachusetts	2020
52nd	Saint Charles, Missouri	2019
51st	New Orleans, Louisiana	January 3-6, 2018
50th	Fort Worth, Texas	January 4-7, 2017
49th	Washington, D.C.	January 6-9, 2016
48th	Seattle, Washington	January 6-11, 2015
47th	Quebec, Canada	January 8-12, 2014
46th	Leicester, Great Britain	January 9–12, 2013
45th	Baltimore, Maryland	January 4–8, 2012
44th	Austin, Texas	January 5–9, 2011
43rd	Amelia Island, Florida	January 6–9, 2010
42nd	Toronto, Ontario, Canada	January 7–11, 2009
41st	Albuquerque, New Mexico	January 9–13, 2008
40th	Williamsburg, Virginia	January 9–14, 2007

The Society, in association with the Advisory Council on Underwater Archaeology, also organises the annual Conference on Historical and Underwater Archaeology, which takes place every January for the delivery of papers and symposia as well as social and professional interaction.

== Leadership ==
The 2022-2023 SHA leadership is as follows:

- President: Julie M. Schablitsky, Maryland State Highway Administration
- President-Elect: Richard F. Veit, Monmouth University
- Secretary: Sarah E. Miller, Florida Public Archaeology Network
- Treasurer: Sara F. Mascia, Historical Perspectives, Inc.

== See also ==
Historical archaeology
