= Chesapeake pipes =

Type of tobacco pipe

Chesapeake pipes, which are also known as colono-pipes, terra-cotta pipes, local pipes, Virginia-made pipes and aboriginal pipes, refer to a type of tobacco pipe that was produced in the Chesapeake Bay region of eastern North America during the 17th century. Made out of local clays, the pipes had a distinctive orange or brown color, with many being decorated with abstract designs and motifs. Such pipes are so common that they have been described as being "ubiquitous in [the] archaeological sites of Virginia and Maryland".

Historical archaeologists debate as to which community was responsible for the production of the Chesapeake pipes, with figures like Matthew Emerson and Leland Ferguson purporting that they were manufactured primarily by African American slaves, whilst others, like L. Mouer, instead argue that the primary producers were Native Americans. Whilst debate continues as to which of these two ethnic groups were the primary producer, it has also been noted that there are examples where Chesapeake pipes were most likely produced by European settlers in the area. Due to the confusion as to which ethnic group was responsible for their manufacture, similarities with a type of North American ceramic earthenware known as colonoware have been made.

== Background ==
In the Chesapeake Bay region during the 17th century, three different ethnic communities coexisted: the English settlers, who were politically, militarily and economically dominant, the African Americans, who were primarily slaves in the service of wealthy English plantation owners, and the Native American groups, who were being increasingly marginalised. Amongst all three of these groups, the smoking of tobacco was common, and all three groups had histories of using clay pipes to smoke the drug. Within 17th-century Chesapeake Bay, there was a significant amount of cooperation and interaction between the members of these different communities, for instance the last pocket of resistance during Bacon's Rebellion of 1676 was recorded as consisting of "eighty Negroes and twenty English" who were cooperating to oppose the Virginia governorship. It would only be in the 18th century that the concept of firmly dividing society up into ethnic groups became acceptable in the region, when laws preventing inter-ethnic marriage were introduced.

The Native American tribes of the Chesapeake region, who were Algonquian speakers, had made use of a type of "relatively small, clay, conical-bowled, obtuse- or right-angled elbow pipe" prior to European and African colonization of the area.

The first African slaves had been brought to the Chesapeake in the early 17th century, being recorded in Virginia in 1619 and in Maryland in 1634. The majority of those brought to this area probably came from the coastal and inland states of Western Africa, but some likely originated from Central Africa, the Congo and Madagascar as well. Western Africans had been smoking tobacco since it was introduced to the area by European traders in the early 16th century, although it remains unknown how prevalent it had become by the seventeenth. Some native African pipe-making manufacturers had been set up, for archaeologists have unearthed locally made clay pipes dating from 17th century Ghana and Mali. Archaeologist Matthew C. Emerson argued that some of those slaves purchased in West Africa and transported to North America brought their own pipe-making techniques with them, highlighting the similarities between certain pipe forms found on the two continents. As evidence, he noted that there were 17th-century pipes found in Mali and other parts of the middle Niger River valley that were "nearly identical" to the Chesapeake pipes found in North America.

Amongst the English settlers, it is known that there were pipe-makers, with documentary evidence noting of at least two professionals in this field having migrated from Europe to the Chesapeake in the 17th century.

== Description ==
Chesapeake pipes were often decorated, with such decorations either encircling the lip of the pipe bowl, covering the middle of the pipe bowl, or extending down the pipe stem. These decorations were produced by incising, stamping or punching into the clay prior to firing it, after which the clay hardened. Various types of decorations were employed in the creation of Chesapeake pipes, including "a range of geometric, figural, and zoomorphic motifs as well as abstract geometric designs."

One of the most common ways that Chesapeake pipes were decorated was through the pointillé effect, in which lines of indented dots would be pushed into the clay. This was produced in two ways, the first of which was rouletting, or using a rolling, toothed wheel to produce the desired effect. The other was by using a single, stationary hand-held tool to indent each of the dots into the clay one by one. Stewart suggested that such punctuations may have been made using shark's teeth. Another, albeit far rarer, form of decoration employed on certain Chesapeake pipes was cord wrapping, in which a piece of cord or string was wrapped tightly around the clay to leave a patterned indentation.

Motifs or symbols were in many cases stamped or incised into the clay pipe, depicting such things as stars, ships, boats, tobacco plants, hearts, humans, animals and geometric shapes. In some cases, white clay had been used to fill in these shapes, making them stand out far more against the red clay that made up the rest of the pipe. Such traces of white clay are very rare on surviving Chesapeake pipes, as it often washes out when buried in the ground.

An experimental archaeological project undertaken by L.B. Gregory to replicate Chesapeake pipes using Virginia clays showed that such items could be manufactured using a simple homemade mold and low-temperature firing, and that therefore "the technology to produce pipe molds was well within the grasp of Native Americans, African Americans, and European Americans in the 17th century."

== Origins ==
Amongst archaeologists, there has been much argument and counter-argument as to whether Native Americans or African Americans were the primary producers of Chesapeake pipes. Proponents of both sides have tried to trace stylistic antecedents in both Native American and West African pipe making, although as Matthew C. Emerson noted, "Examining decorative effects and techniques and identifying them with ethnic groups is a weak approach to identifying people with their art." The first archaeologist to note the problem of associating specific ethnic groups with Chesapeake pipes was J. C. "Pinky" Harrington who, in a 1951 article, stated that "one of the most intriguing problems [of Jamestown archaeology] is that of the hand-molded pipes… Many are obviously of Indian [i.e. Native American] manufacture, but some have been made by the [European] settlers following Indian styles and techniques."

Problems arise because no definite manufacturing site for Chesapeake pipes has ever been unearthed in the archaeological record. Emerson noted the many issues that prevent archaeologists finding such evidence, arguing that any metal molds that had been used in their production would have been melted down and recast for use elsewhere, rather than being abandoned and left in the archaeological record. He also argued that the clay used in making the pipes was so abundant around the Chesapeake region that it was problematic to identify specific sites where the pipe-makers had gathered their clay.

=== Native American argument ===
A number of archaeologists have argued that the Chesapeake pipes were products of members of local Algonquian-speaking Native American tribes such as the Pamunkey. L. Mouer et al noted that there were historical records written by Europeans that described how Natives created their own tobacco pipes, for example the exiled French Huguenot Durand Du Dauphiné, writing in 1686, remarked that Native women living on the Rappahannock River made "pots, earthen vases and smoking pipes", whilst John Clayton recorded that Natives living in Virginia "smoak [sic] in short pipes of their own making having excellent clay".

=== African American argument ===
The archaeologist Matthew C. Emerson argued that a study of the decoration on Chesapeake pipes revealed that their producers were of African origin because of similarities that he saw between them and 17th-century West African pipes.
