= John L. Cotter =

American archaeologist (1911–1999)

- Born: 6 December 1911; Denver, Colorado
- Died: 5 February 1999 (aged 87)
- Known for: Contributions to American archaeology

John Lambert Cotter (6 December 1911 – 5 February 1999) was an American archaeologist whose career spanned more than sixty years and included archaeological work with the Works Progress Administration, numerous posts with the National Park Service, and contributions to the development of historical archaeology in the United States.

== Education ==
Cotter was born in Denver, Colorado to John Aloysius Cotter and Bertha Becker Cotter. He spent his childhood in Colorado, Washington, Montana and California, due to the nature of his father's job. He graduated from a Denver high school and attended the University of Denver where he worked for the National Youth Administration, and tutored students in geology, expecting that he would study English and pursue a career in journalism. Cotter quickly found that he had accrued more credits in anthropology than any other subject. As Cotter told an archeologist Daniel G. Roberts in an interview,

I went to the Dean of Men, and said, "I find that I have actually come to a major in anthropology and I don't know whether I can make a living at it. What would you say I'd better do?" And he told me something I've never forgotten. "If you're interested in something enough you'll make a living in it." So I took him at his word and went ahead.

After earning a B.A. in Anthropology from the University of Denver, Cotter continued and earned an M.A., conducting research at a series of prehistoric sites in the western United States and writing a thesis under E.B. Renaud. Cotter then began working toward a PhD at the University of Pennsylvania in 1935, where he failed his prelims. He would ultimately receive his doctorate from the University of Pennsylvania in 1959 while working as Regional Archaeologist for the Northeast Region of the National Park Service.

== Work ==
Cotter accepted a position with the University of Kentucky's Works Progress Administration (WPA)-funded Archaeological Survey in December 1937. In 1940, Cotter took his first post with the National Park Service at Tuzigoot National Monument in central Arizona. He held this position for thirty-seven years. In 1941, he married Virginia Wilkins Tomlin.

When his draft number was called in 1943, Cotter joined the U. S. Army. After seventeen weeks of training, Cotter was sent along with the 357th Infantry Regiment of the 90th Division to serve in the invasion of Normandy. Cotter was wounded and flown to Churchill Hospital in London for rehabilitation. He then returned to France to train at the Armed Forces Institute and was subsequently transferred to London, where he joined the staff of the Armed Forces correspondence school. Cotter earned a Purple Heart for his service at the invasion of Normandy as well as the European and Combat Infantryman badges. He returned home in December 1945 to resume his career at Tuzigoot.

Cotter was transferred to Natchez State Parkway at Tupelo, Mississippi, in 1947 to carry out an archaeological survey along the former Natchez Trace Trail, which ran from Natchez, Mississippi, to Nashville, Tennessee. From there, Cotter served as Acting Chief Archaeologist of the National Park Service in Washington, D.C. while Chief Archaeologist John Corbett fulfilled his duties as an Army reserve officer.

It was in 1954 that Cotter took charge of field projects at Jamestown, Virginia, conducted with the site's 350th anniversary (1957) in mind. Cotter worked with Edward B. Jelks and J.C. "Pinky" Harrington to survey the area's colonial sites. This experience, Cotter claims, introduced him to the value of historical archaeology, a field developing from Harrington's work as Regional Archaeologist for the Southeastern Region of the National Park Service. Cotter contributed, along with Edward B. Jelks, Georg Neumann, and Johnny Hack, to the 1958 report Archaeological Excavations at Jamestown.

Cotter returned as Regional Archaeologist for the Northeast Region of the National Park Service in July 1957, a position he would hold until 1977. Moving to Philadelphia in this new role, Cotter simultaneously returned to the University of Pennsylvania. After taking courses for two years, he received his doctorate in 1959, more than twenty years after he originally began.

At the 1958 Annual Meeting of the American Anthropological Association in Washington, D.C., Cotter chaired a symposium on the role of archaeology in historical research. Cotter, Edward B. Jelks, Edward Larrabee, and Stanley South subsequently discussed forming a society devoted to historical archaeology. When the Society for Historical Archaeology was incorporated on 1 April 1968, Cotter was elected to serve as its first president.

Following the completion of his doctoral degree, Cotter was offered a teaching position at the University of Pennsylvania in 1960. He taught the first courses in historical archaeology from 1960 until 1979, focusing on his work in 17th-century Virginia. Cotter began teaching field schools in historical archaeology in 1963. He also worked as curator for American Historical Archaeology at the University of Pennsylvania Museum of Archaeology and Anthropology from 1971 to 1980.

== Contributions to American archaeology ==
Cotter is known for his work at Jamestown, Virginia. He also developed a reputation as an authority on Paleoindians, based largely on his work at the Blackwater Draw site in the 1930s, where the first stratigraphical separation of Clovis and Folsom artifacts was reported.

In 1935–1954, his archeological research focused on prehistoric excavations in Colorado, Kentucky, Tennessee, Alabama, and Mississippi; during 1954–1999, he shifted his attention to historic Euro-American sites and artifacts of the Atlantic seaboard of North America.

Recognizing importance of the emerging field of historical archaeology, Cotter co-founded the Society for Historical Archaeology and was elected as its first president. In 1999, the Society established The John L. Cotter Award to honor him.

When he stepped down from the National Park Service in 1977, Cotter was given the National Park Service Outstanding Service Award. In 1984, Cotter received the J. C. Harrington Award from the Society for Historical Archaeology for his contributions to the discipline. He was bestowed with David E. Finley award for Outstanding Achievement in Historic Preservation by the National Trust for Historic Preservation. He also received, alongside Edward B. Jelks, the Historic Preservation Award of the Association for the Preservation of Virginia Antiquities (now Preservation Virginia).

Cotter called for a collaborative effort between professional and amateur archeologists in preservation efforts,

Many willing groups of amateurs exist who may take pleasure and pride in contributing their services gratis or for essential expenses, but they must be competently led ... . Yet the intelligent cooperation of the amateur archaeologist remains the best hope of nourishing the cause of conservation and reminding elected office-holders of the national duty to preserve the story of the past. The informed and interested layman and the professional archaeologist here join hands in a common effort.

== Publications ==
- Cotter, John L, and John M. Corbett. Archeology of the Bynum Mounds, Mississippi. Washington, D.C: National Park Service, U.S. Dept. of the Interior, 1951.
- Cotter, John L, and J P. Hudson. New Discoveries at Jamestown: Site of the First Successful English Settlement in America. Washington, D.C: U.S. Dept. of the Interior, National Park Service, 1957.
- Cotter, John L. Archeological Excavations at Jamestown Colonial National Historical Park and Jamestown National Historic Site, Virginia. Washington: National Park Service, U.S. Dept. of the Interior, 1959.
- Cotter, John L. Cotter, John L. Bibliography of Historical Sites Archaeology: Section I – Historical Site Artifacts. Section II – Historical Sites Excavation Reports, 1966.
- Cotter, John L. Handbook for Historical Archaeology. Philadelphia, 1968.
- Cotter, John L, and Roger W. Moss. The Walnut Street Prison Workshop: A Test Study in Historical Archaeology Based on Field Investigation in the Garden Area of the Athenaeum of Philadelphia. Philadelphia: Athenaeum of Philadelphia, 1988.
- Cotter, John L., Daniel G. Roberts, and Michael Parrington. The buried past: An archaeological history of Philadelphia. University of Pennsylvania Press, 1992.

== See also ==
- Historical archaeology
- Society for Historical Archaeology
