= Parting Ways (Plymouth, Massachusetts) =

Historic site in Plymouth County

- Parting Ways Archeological District
- U.S. National Register of Historic Places
- U.S. Historic district
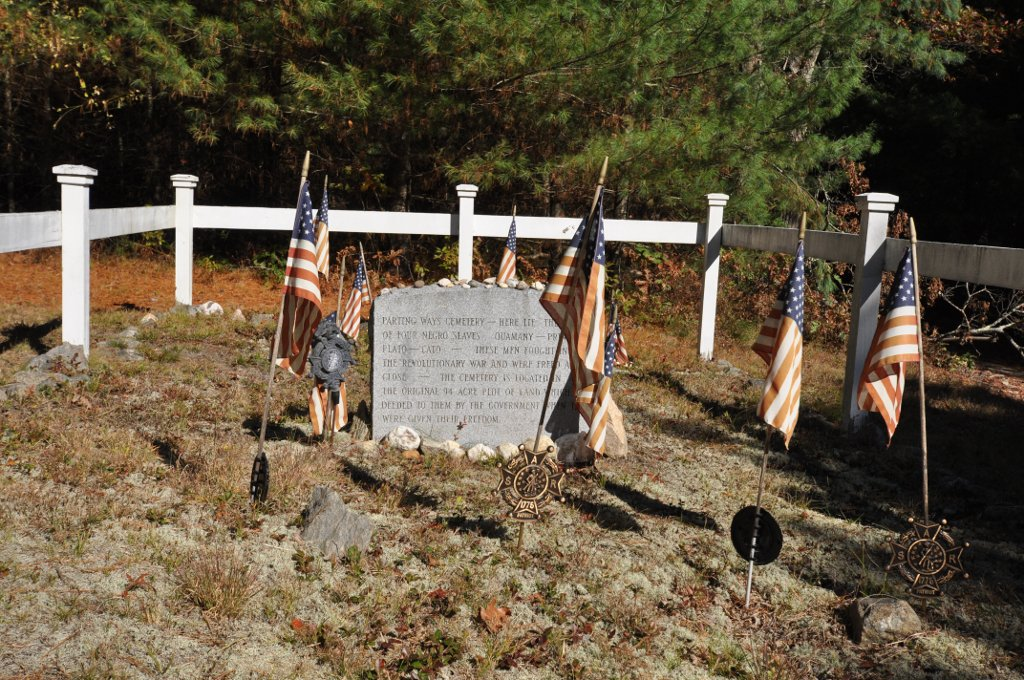

- Location within Massachusetts Location within the United States
- Location: Plymouth, Massachusetts
- NRHP reference No.: 79000367
- Added to NRHP: April 19, 1979

Parting Ways was an African-American settlement of free Black people adjacent to present-day Route 80 in Plymouth, Massachusetts, near the Plymouth/Kingston town line. Other names for Parting Ways include the Parting Ways Archeological District and the Parting Ways New Guinea Settlement. It was founded on 94 acres (380,000 m^{2}) by four former enslaved people who fought in the American Revolutionary War: Cato Howe, Prince Goodwin, Plato Turner, and Quamony Quash and their families. They were granted their freedom by the Massachusetts courts due to their service in the war. The land was granted in 1792 as part of an agreement with the town of Plymouth, that whosoever could clear the land could claim ownership of it. Part of this land was added to the National Register of Historic Places on April 19, 1979.

The site consists of a cemetery, trash middens, and the foundations of the families' houses. This site was excavated in the middle 1970s by an archaeological team headed by Dr. James Deetz, a professor of anthropology at Brown University and assistant director at Plimoth Plantation. In the chapter entitled, "Parting Ways," in his 1977 book, In Small Things Forgotten, Deetz demonstrates that 18th and early 19th century African Americans retained certain ethnically distinctive folkways of African origin. Their houses were arranged in the distinctive shotgun house style, and their meat was butchered by chopping, whereas their white neighbors butchered by sawing across the bones. Deetz' shotgun house interpretation of the extremely limited evidence – two rooms that "may or may not have been unified" – has been challenged as "premature".

== See also ==
- National Register of Historic Places listings in Plymouth County, Massachusetts
