= Colonoware =

Type of American pottery

Colonoware, which is alternately called Colono-Indian Ware, is a type of earthenware created by African Americans along the Atlantic Coast ranging north and south from Delaware to Florida and as far west as Tennessee and Kentucky beginning in the Colonial era. It was first identified by the British archaeologist Ivor Noël Hume and shortly thereafter published in a book he wrote.

== History ==
In Charleston, South Carolina, thirteen colonoware vessels from the 18th century were found with folded strip roulette decorations. From the time of colonial America until the 19th century in the United States, African Americans and their enslaved African ancestors, as well as Native Americans who were enslaved and not enslaved, were creating colonoware of this pottery style. Roulette decorated pottery likely originated in West Africa and in the northern region of Central Africa amid 2000 BCE. The longstanding pottery tradition, from which for the Charleston colonoware derives, likely began its initial development between 800 BCE and 400 BCE in Mali; thereafter, the pottery tradition expanded around 900 CE into the Lake Chad basin, into the southeastern region of Mauritania by 1200 CE, and, by the 19th century CE, expanded southward. More specifically, the pottery style for the Charleston colonoware may have been created by 18th century peoples (e.g., Kanuri people, Hausa people in Kano) of the Kanem–Bornu Empire. Within a broader context, following the 17th century enslavement of western Africans for the farming of rice in South Carolina, the Charleston colonoware may be understood as Africanisms from West/Central Africa, which endured the Middle Passage, and became transplanted into the local culture of colonial-era Lowcountry, South Carolina.

== Creation ==
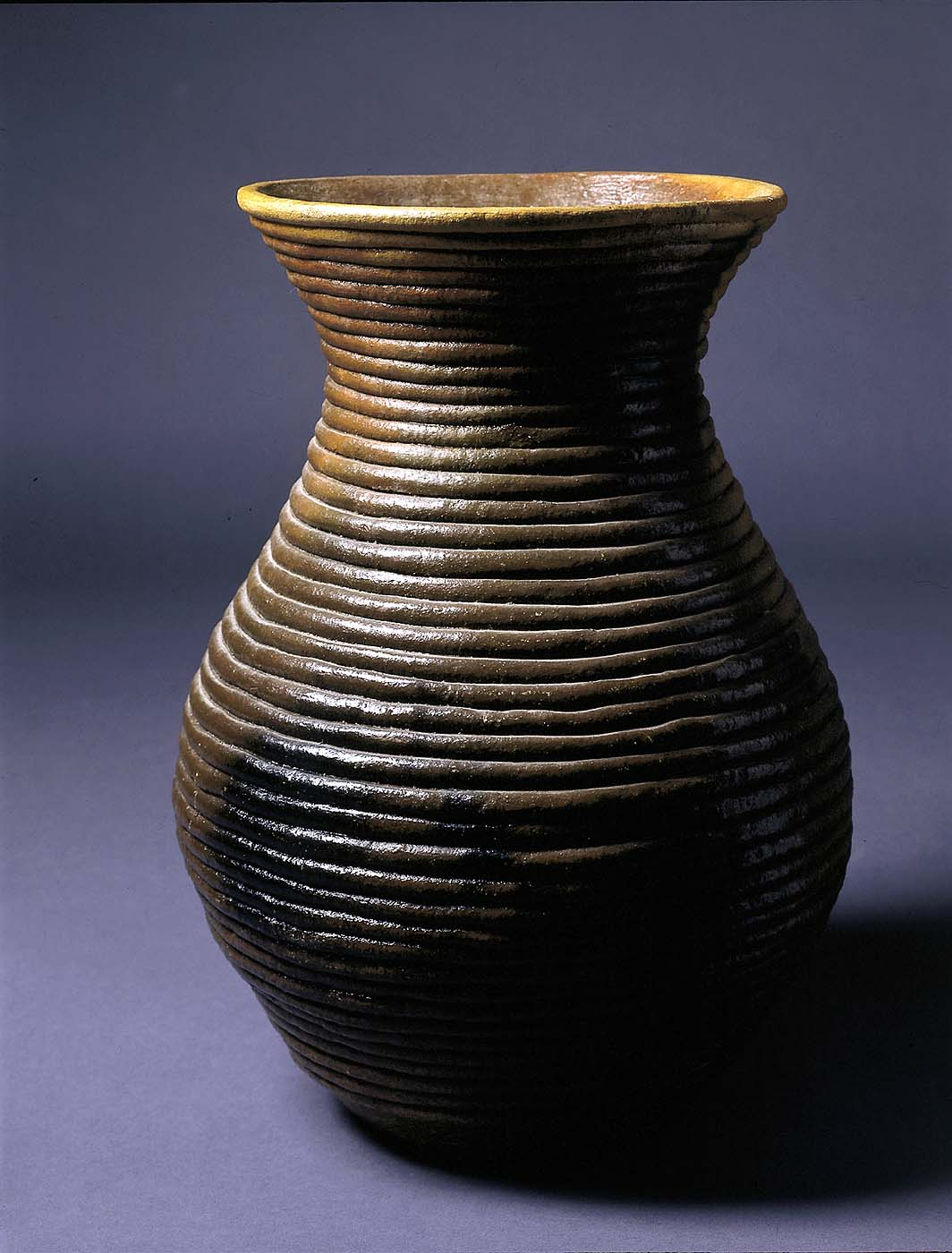
example of pottery coiling

Colonoware is unique from other forms of clay creation. Techniques such as coiling was common rather than the European American style of wheel throwing and molding. Burnishing and glazing were typical methods so long as the items created were not decorated or for sale. The British mercantile economy at the time limited the production of objects created by slaves. Importation of raw materials from the colonies to England was facilitated by Britain. These materials would be remanufactured and resold as more expensive object to the colonies. This forced slaves and plantation owners to create or demand their own form of "rudimentary pottery" to avoid the higher expenses, i.e. colonoware. Many of the objects that are identified as colonoware take the form of mugs, pots, bowls, pitchers, colanders and other household kitchen and cooking objects.

== Archaeological investigation and specific sites ==
Archeologists are crucial to understanding the meaning of and use and timeline of material goods, when there are few written records on those goods such as in the case of colonoware. Colonoware was first identified by the British archaeologist Ivor Noël Hume, who published his findings in 1962, in a paper entitled "An Indian Ware of the Colonial Period" in the Quarterly Bulletin of the Archaeological Society of Virginia. He devoted to the discussion of this particular earthenware, and intended his paper to be a contribution to the "study of American Indian archaeology and culture". He referred to it as Colono-Indian Ware, believing that it had been developed by Native Americans, who then sold it for the use of African American slaves and European Americans. Similar records of pottery have been identified as coming from the Chickahominy, Mattaponi, Pamunkey, and Catawba Native Americans but a common consensus has concluded that similar traditional earthenware also existed in Western Africa.

In subsequent decades, further excavations took place across South Carolina under the mandates of the National Historic Preservation Act and other federal statutes. Through these excavations, much more colonoware was unearthed, leading one archaeologist working in the state, Leland Ferguson, to examine it further. In doing so, he came to the conclusion that the majority of it was produced not by Native Americans, but by African Americans. The concentration of colonoware found, in locations with known plantation activity suggest the conclusion of the presence of colonoware being an indication slave adaptation for utilitarian use.

Manassas, Virginia is another specific location where several sites unearthed evidence of Colonoware use. Many of the locations in Manassas were farms and small plantations due to this being a community heavily reliant on agriculture. These sites occupied a range of people over a long period of time including those enslaved, free white households with slave labor, and free black households. The presence of people of different social status and different ethnic backgrounds allows archeologists to examine how the use of colonoware changed over time. Research in this area helped contribute to the argument that colonoware became a badge of disenfranchisement for those who were forced to make and use it due to conditions of slavery.

== Status and symbolism ==
Discovered in the analysis of the Manassas local as discussed in the section above, it has been assumed that colonoware was only used by enslaved African Americans. Therefore, this formed colonoware as an ethnic marker. If slaves gained their freedom, and they had the financial capability, they would distance themselves with physical items that were associated with slavery. Consumerism among Americans and representation of social status became more common during the 19th century. This led freed slaves to reject the use of colonoware due to their new ability to participate in consumerism and trade. This is supported with archeological evidence that in the late 19th century, following the emancipation of slaves, the use of colonoware greatly decreased.

=== Afro-carolinian face vessels ===
Following the United States gaining its independence from Britain, and where decorative pottery was allowed, colonoware was sometimes used as a symbol of status by slaves and occasionally freemen through "power" sculptures in the form of Afro-carolinian face vessels. These vessels were produced by slaves as personal items and were functional jugs that are noted for their dramatic facial distortions that are distinct from colonoware produced for owners and employers. The Afro-carolinian face vessels are linked to West African traditions, often employing the use of white clay for an emphasis of eyes and teeth, a practice that can be traced back to Africa used for religious purposes. For example, portrait pots called wiiso were commonly used in West Africa to honor ancestral spirits and shrines.

== Slave and free entrepreneurs ==
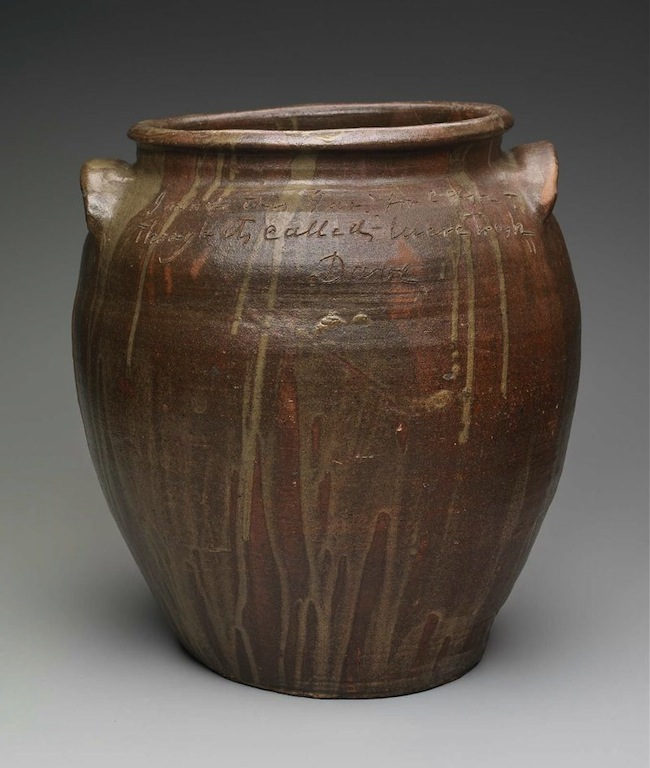
Dave the Potter vessel

Slave entrepreneurs were working men and women in the slave community who participated in the trading of goods and services. They were required to give the majority of their earnings to their owners. Manufacturing restrictions regarding ceramics were lifted during the Federal period giving potters the freedom to produce work that expanded past simple colonoware. David Drake, better recognized as "Dave the Potter," was an enslaved ceramist from Edgefield, South Carolina. He is believed to be the only potter to have signed his work. Not much is known about Dave other than what is documented in historical records. It is assumed that he began his apprenticeship in a local shop and was taught by European American potters. He is one of the 76 known slaves to have lived and worked in Edgefield, and it is believed that he was taught to read and write before 1837 when a law was passed in South Carolina that prohibited slaves to be taught such things. Specific pieces of colonoware that Dave typically created consisted of "large storage jars with horizontal slab handles, used for large scale plantation food preservation." Only one other slave entrepreneur was recognized in this region for creating such large scale pieces like Daves. His name was Thomas Chandler.

Thomas Commeraw was another potter like Dave during this time. Unlike Dave, Commeraw was a free black entrepreneur in New York. He was responsible for creating salt-glazed stoneware rather than hand forged ceramics. Due to his status as a free man, Commeraw's business thrived and he was able to open his own factory. His clients often consisted of wealthier individuals in the area, some of which included "oyster harvesters, church leaders, and abolitionists" all of which were interracial. He supplied them with a variety of vessels in many different shapes and sizes which were used for storing and preserving food and liquor. His work can be recognized through its often egg-shaped forms and beige color palette. Like Dave, he left his mark on his works with a stamp that read "Commeraw Stoneware."
