= James Deetz =

American archaeologist (1930–2000)

James Deetz (February 8, 1930 – November 25, 2000) was an American anthropologist, often known as one of the fathers of historical archaeology. His work focused on culture change and the cultural aspects inherent in the historic and archaeological record, and was concerned primarily with the Massachusetts and Virginia colonies. James Deetz was interested in obtaining valuable information that could be used to better understand the lives of early North American colonists, natives, and African Americans. He investigated a variety of material culture related to these groups to better comprehend their social behavior.

In 1997 Deetz received the J. C. Harrington Award, presented by the Society for Historical Archaeology for his life-time contributions to archaeology centered on scholarship.

== Biography ==
Deetz was born in Cumberland, Maryland, coal country, and was the first in his family to finish high school, much less follow with three Harvard degrees on a full scholarship. He felt a particular affinity for author John Updike and regretted that their times at Harvard did not overlap.

Deetz received his BA, MA, and PhD degrees from Harvard. Following college, Deetz enlisted in the United States Air Force. He served for four years before he was honorably discharged in 1955.

In 1957, he began working on the River Basin Survey site in Missouri. This work inspired him to get his PhD dissertation in "An Archaeological Approach to Kinship Change in Eighteenth Century Arikara Culture." Deetz then became an Assistant Professor of Anthropology at the University of California. He also taught at University of California, Santa Barbara, Harvard, Brown, William and Mary, the University of Cape Town, the University of California, Berkeley, and the University of Virginia. While teaching at the University of California, Deetz teamed up with J. O. Brew and Harry Hornblower to excavate sites related to North American colonial archaeology. He would later meet Henry Glassie who was his inspiration to write In Small Things Forgotten: The Archaeology of Early American Life, which was published in 1977.

By the time he was an established scholar, he was active in evaluating grant applications for the National Endowment for the Sciences and was particularly fond of having approved the construction of a 19th-century settlement village proposed to be burned to the ground so that the patterns of nail distribution could be studied to allow more accurate reconstruction of archaeological sites.

Deetz was appointed assistant director at Plimoth Plantation in 1959, and implemented changes to the way the heritage site was run. He removed everything which would not have been in the settlement in 1637, such as interpretative signs, and introduced first-person interpretation by costumed staff: "part of a simulation of life in which all senses are involved, feeling, thinking, and acting in an environment as close to reality as research could make it". Deetz and his wife, Jody Deetz, brought up their nine children whilst he was working at the site. Deetz worked at Plimoth Plantation until 1978, when he took up a position at University of California, Berkeley.

== Contributions ==
Deetz emphasized the importance of analyzing the physical artifacts themselves, rather than just interpreting them from archaeological reports. Deetz wrote more than 60 articles and books, influencing the style of how authors in the field of archaeology write. One of Deetz's most famous works, In Small Things Forgotten, he used a simple yet sophisticated writing style which incorporated detailed examples of his research, including the methods and theories of his works. This book is still used in introductory archaeology classrooms today because of its ability to be understood at a basic level.

Deetz was one of the first archaeologists to foresee the influence that technology could have on the evolution of archaeology. While working on a site in Massachusetts in 1959, Deetz was able to tie in technology into the archaeological profession. He wrote a program that was used in an IBM mainframe computer, which was able to sort rim sherds based on specific characteristics of each individual piece. The program successfully differentiated and sorted the different sherds. The success of his program illustrated how archaeology can be more accurate by eliminating the human bias from rim sherd sorting. Programming today is now a much more efficient and accurate process than from the past, meaning archaeologists now routinely use its power in their work. Jim Deetz was able to influence the use of technology in the field of archaeology, making the profession much more accurate.

== Published works ==
- The Times of Their Lives: Life, Love, and Death in Plymouth Colony. (With Patricia Scott Deetz). New York: W.H. Freeman. 2000.
- In Small Things Forgotten: An Archaeology of Early American Life. (Expanded and revised edition). New York: Anchor, Doubleday. 1996.
- Flowerdew Hundred: The Archaeology of a Virginia Plantation, 1619–1864. Charlottesville: University Press of Virginia. 1993.
- "The Transformation of British Culture in the Eastern Cape, 1820–1860" (with Margot Winer). Social Dynamics vol. 16 no.1 pp. 55–75. 1990.
- "American Historical Archaeology: Methods and Results". Science vol. 239, January 22: 362–67. 1988.
- "History and Archaeological Theory: Walter Taylor Revisited". American Antiquity 53(1):13–22. 1988.
- In Small Things Forgotten: The Archaeology of Early American Life. New York: Doubleday. 1977.
- Invitation to Archaeology. Garden City, NY: Natural History Press. 1967

== See also ==
- Colonial America
- Parting Ways (Plymouth, Massachusetts)
