= List of shipwrecks in the 17th century =

The list of shipwrecks in the 17th century includes ships sunk, wrecked or otherwise lost between (and including) the years 1601 to 1700.

== 1601–1610 ==
=== 1601 ===
- 20 July – Gift (England): The East India Company vessel was abandoned in the Atlantic while on a voyage from Torbay to the Canaries.

=== 1606 ===
- 18 August – Dom Duarte De Guerra (Portugal): The Portuguese Navy galleon was lost during the Battle of Cape Rachado within the Strait of Malacca. The wreck was found in 1993 off the Bambeek Shoal.
- 18 August – Middelburg ( Dutch East India Company): The ship was lost during the Battle of Cape Rachado off Port Dickson, Malay Peninsula. The wreck was found in 1993 off the Bambeek Shoal.
- 18 August – São Salvador (Portugal): The Portuguese Navy frigate was lost during the Battle of Cape Rachado within the Strait of Malacca. The wreck was found in 1993 off the Bambeek Shoal.
- 18 or 22 August – Nassau ( Dutch East India Company): The ship was lost during the Battle of Cape Rachado off Port Dickson, Malay Peninsula. The wreck was found in 1993 off the Bambeek Shoal.
- Unknown date – Nossa Senhora dos Mártires (Portugal): Lost off the mouth of the River Tagus, near Lisbon. She was carrying peppercorns of black pepper (Piper nigrum), with some salvaged and all the crew of the nau saved.

=== 1607 ===
- 20 July – Gelderland ( Dutch East India Company): The ship was wrecked while leaving Vlissingen in a storm.

=== 1609 ===
- 28 July – Sea Venture (England): Having left England for the colony at Jamestown, Virginia, the Sea Venture was blown off course, developed a serious leak in a hurricane and, on seeing land, grounded on a reef east of St. George's Island, Bermuda whilst trying to reach shore. The one hundred and fifty crew and passengers were the first settlers on Bermuda.
- 24 August – Good Hope (England): The pinnace was wrecked on the coast of Gujarat, India. (Date is approximate).
- 3 September – Ascension (England): The crew of the East India Company vessel, abandoned ship when she ran aground on the Malacca Banks, in the Gulf of Khambhat. The crew reached Surat, Gujarat.
- Unknown date – San Francisco (Spain): The ship sank off the coast of Japan. She was on a voyage from New Spain to the Spanish East Indies.

=== 1610 ===
- 10 January – Nossa Senhora da Graça ( (Portugal) Portuguese Empire): The carrack was scuttled in Nagasaki Bay, Empire of Japan with much loss of life.

== 1611–1620 ==
=== 1613 ===
- 7 August – Brak ( Dutch East India Company): The pinnace ran aground off Madagascar.
- November – Tyger (Dutch Republic): The ship was destroyed by fire in the Hudson River, North America.

=== 1616 ===
- 4 January
  - Abraham (Flag unknown): The ship was wrecked on the Goodwin Sands, Kent.
  - Jonas (Flag unknown): The ship was wrecked on the Goodwin Sands.
  - Unknown ship (Flag unknown): The ship was wrecked on the Goodwin Sands.
- 25 August – Kleine Aeolus ( Dutch East India Company): The pinnace ran aground off Engano, West Sumatra while en route for Batam from Coromandel.
- 25 November – Nuestra Señora de la Concepción (Spain): The carrack was wrecked off the Portuguese coast on her return from the Indies to Viana do Castelo.
- Unknown date
  - Unknown ship (Spain): Thought to be a cargo vessel which foundered off Rill Cove, near Kynance Cove in Mount's Bay, Cornwall. Finds include 300 coins in two datable groups 1555–98 and 1598–1603/5. The year 1616 is tentative.
  - Unknown ship: Wrecked offshore of the Isles of Scilly.

1616 or 1617

- Unknown date – Unknown ship: (England): Equipped by Sir Walter Raleigh at his own expense, the ship sank in the Isles of Scilly during a gale, while outward bound to Guiana seeking gold.

=== 1617 ===
- 10 January – Johane (Dutch Republic): The ship was wrecked on the Goodwin Sands, Kent, England.
- 17 July – Duyfken ( Dutch East India Company): The 50 ton pinnace ran aground off Suratte, while en route from Bantam.
- 19 July – Middelburg ( Dutch East India Company): The frigate was lost off Suratte while on a journey from Bantam to Suratte.
- Unknown date – Supply (Kingdom of England): The pinnace, belonging to the East India Company, was driven aground on the Western Rocks, Isles of Scilly while homeward bound from Bantam to London. Men saved and goods salvaged, and she made a second voyage to Java in 1621 and was reported as laid up, there, in 1623.

=== 1618 ===
- 21 August – Golden Wagon (England): The ship was driven ashore and wrecked near Dover, Kent.
- November – Blind Fortune (England): The barquentine was wrecked on the Goodwin Sands, Kent.
- 15 November – Sun (England): The East Indiaman ran aground at Engano, Sumatra.
- Unknown date – Sampson (Dutch Republic): The ship was wrecked on the Goodwin Sands.

=== 1619 ===
- 20 November – Warwick (England): The merchantman, owned by the Earl of Warwick and on charter to the Virginia Company, sank during a gale in Castle Harbour, Bermuda. The passengers had disembarked and the cargo unloaded before the storm.
- Unknown date – Unnamed ship (Spain): With a cargo of silver bullion, the San Lucar ship was wrecked near Polpear Cove on the Lizard peninsula.

== 1621–1630 ==
=== 1621 ===
- Unknown date – Ark Noah (Hamburg): The ship was wrecked on the Goodwin Sands, Kent, England.

=== 1622 ===
- 25 May
  - Tryall (England): The ship struck submerged rocks off the Montebello Islands, Western Australia. The crew survived. This is the oldest known shipwreck in Australian waters.
- 5 September
  - Buen Jesus y Nuestra Senora del Rosario (Spain): The sailing ship, along with seven others, out of a fleet of twenty-eight, was lost during a hurricane in the Gulf of Mexico, between Florida and Cuba. The ships, left Havana on 4 September, with gold for the Spanish treasury.
  - Nuestra Senora de la Consolacion (Spain): The galleon capsized during the same hurricane as, Buen Jesus y Nuestra Senora del Rosario.
  - Nuestra Senora de los Reyes (Spain): The slave ship sank near East Key, part of the Florida Keys in the Gulf of Mexico.
- 6 September
  - Nuestra Senora de Atocha (Spain): Out of Havana and carrying a valuable cargo of silver, gold and tobacco for Spain, two hundred and sixty people died when Atocha sank in deep water in the Gulf of Mexico.
  - Santa Margarita (1622) (Spain): One of eight ships that sank between Havana and Florida with a cargo of gold and silver.

=== 1623 ===
- 19 July – Valk ( Dutch East India Company): The ship was lost off Formosa while in the service of the Kamer van Amsterdam.
- November – Anne Lyon (England): The ship was wrecked on the Goodwin Sands, Kent.
- December – Unidentified ship (Flag unknown): The ship was wrecked on the Goodwin Sands.

=== 1624 ===
- 15 July – White Swan (Hamburg): The ship was wrecked on the Goodwin Sands, Kent, England.
- 4 October – A storm wrecked many of the 120 vessels anchored in The Downs and 20 of them foundered.
- 4 October
  - A warship (French Navy) exploded in The Downs with the loss of 200 of her crew.
  - A warship (Dutch Republic Navy), the flagship of Mooy Lambert, foundered in The Downs. Her crew survived.
- 27 October – Dolphin (England): The ship was wrecked on the Goodwin Sands.

=== 1625 ===
- 23 February – Golden Rose (Hamburg): The ship was wrecked on the Goodwin Sands, Kent, England. She was on a voyage from St. Lucar, Spain to Hamburg.
- 5 July – Alkmaar ( Dutch East India Company): The East Indiaman was lost off Texel.
- 25 September – Moon (England): The East Indiaman was wrecked on the Goodwin Sands.

=== 1626 ===
- 21 June – Three great ships (one Dutch Republic) were sunk in The Downs when one of them exploded.

=== 1627 ===
- 28 November – Solen ( Sweden): The 38-gun galleon was scuttled by the crew during a battle off Danzig. In the 1970s the vessel was excavated by Polish archaeologists.

=== 1628 ===
- 10 August – Vasa ( Royal Swedish Navy): The warship capsized and sank off Stockholm on her maiden voyage with the loss of 30 lives. The wreck was salvaged in 1959.

=== 1629 ===
- 4 June – Batavia ( Dutch East India Company): The vessel struck Morning Reef near Beacon Island, Western Australia on her maiden voyage from Texel for Batavia. Forty people drowned and over one hundred people died during a mutiny.
- 24 August – L´estourneau: Capsized during a storm off Canso, Nova Scotia with the loss of fourteen people.

== 1631–1640 ==
=== 1631 ===
- March – Fame (Dutch Republic): The ship was wrecked on a sandbank at the mouth of Poole Harbour, Dorset, England. All on board survived. She was on a voyage from Hoorn to the West Indies.
- 10 September – Vrede ( Dutch East India Company): The pinnace ran aground and was wrecked, when her cables parted during a typhoon near Hirado, Japan. Four other ships, Arend, Heusden, Kemphaan and Parel also ran aground but were refloated.
- 12 September
  - Nossa Senhora dos Prazeres (Portugal): The galleon sank in battle against the Dutch flagship Prins Willem, during the Battle of Albrolhos, near the islands of Abrolhos, off the Bahia coast, Brazil. This was the smaller of two Portuguese ships called Nossa Senhora dos Prazeres involved in the battle.
  - Prins Willem ( Dutch East India Company): The carrack and flagship of Admiral Peter was lost during the Battle of Albrolhos, near the islands of Abrolhos, off the Bahia coast, Brazil.
  - Provincie Utrecht ( Dutch East India Company): The carrack was lost during the Battle of Albrolhos, near the islands of Abrolhos, off the Bahia coast, Brazil.
  - San Antonio (Spain): The galleon sank during the Battle of Albrolhos, near the islands of Abrolhos, off the Bahia coast, Brazil.
- 21 October – Nuestra Señora del Juncal (Spain): The galleon sank off the coast of Mexico, during its journey between Veracruz and Havana, as it was heading to Spain. Of the 300 people on board, only 39 survived.

=== 1632 ===
- January – Unnamed cargo ship: Wrecked in Manor of Tintagel near Crackington, St Gennys, Cornwall with the loss of all lives. She was carrying fustick wood and tobacco.

=== 1633 ===
- July – Blessing of Burntisland (Scotland): The ship capsized and sank in the Firth of Forth off Burntisland, Fife with the loss of 33 of the 35 people on board.
- Unknown date— Alfresia (Spain): The ship was wrecked at Dungeness, Kent, England.

=== 1634 ===
- 24 July – Grotebroek ( Dutch East India Company): The ship ran aground on a shoal in the Paracels, South China Sea.
- 11 October – At Dagebüll, Netherlands ships were left stranded on the dike, and at Husum, Netherlands ships were washed on to the highway after a flood, known as the Burchardi flood. Eight thousand to fifteen thousand people are estimated to have drowned.

=== 1635 ===
- February – A galleon (Spain): Homeward bound from the Indies, the galleon was captured and looted by the Dutch. Putting into "Guavers Lake" (Gwavas Lake) off Newlyn she hit the Low Lee ledge. Attempts at salvage by the authorities were opposed by the inhabitants of Mousehole and Market Jew who raided the ship at night and took away "two hundred hides". A looted cannon from this ship was salvaged by the Greencastle in 1916 and for many years was in front of Penzance Library, before being stolen.
- 24 July – Nossa Senhora de Belem (Portugal): The East Indiaman was wrecked north east of Port St. Johns, Dutch Cape Colony. All on board survived. She was on a voyage from Goa, Portuguese India to Lisbon.
- 15 August – Angel Gabriel (Kingdom of England): Operating as a merchant ship as part of a small convoy bound from England to the Massachusetts Bay Colony, the 240-ton galleon was driven onto rocks on the coast of the Massachusetts Bay Colony at Pemaquid Point in Penaquid (now Bristol, Maine), during a storm, killing most of the people on board. There were some survivors.

=== 1636 ===
- 24 March – Gift of God (Scotland): Sailing ship of Kirkcaldy wrecked in the Isles of Scilly.

=== 1637 ===
- 18 February – Three Dutch Republic warships were lost during a naval action off the coast of the Lizard peninsula, Cornwall. A Spanish armada of eight warships intercepted an Anglo-Dutch merchant convey of fifty vessels and also captured seventeen of the ships.

=== 1638 ===
- 22 August
  - Battle of Getaria: The fireship Chasseur (French Navy) was expended in battle.
  - Battle of Getaria: The fireship Fortune (French Navy) was expended in battle.
  - Battle of Getaria: The fireship Ours (French Navy) was expended in battle.
  - Battle of Getaria: The fireship Saint Jean Baptiste (French Navy) was expended in battle.
  - Battle of Getaria: The fireship Saint Louis d'Olonne (French Navy) was expended in battle.
  - Battle of Getaria: The fireship Soleil (French Navy) was expended in battle.

=== 1639 ===
- 18 September – Action of 18 September 1639: The full-rigged ship Groote Christoffel (Dutch Republic) exploded and sank in the English Channel off Calais, Kingdom of France.
- 31 October
  - Delfin Dorado ( (Spain) Kingdom of Naples): Battle of the Downs: The ship was driven ashore on the coast of Kent, England.
  - El Pingue (Spain): Battle of the Downs: The hired ship was sunk in The Downs.
  - Grune ( Castile): Battle of the Downs: The ship was driven ashore on the coast of Kent.
  - Los Angeles ( Castile): Battle of the Downs: The ship was driven ashore on the coat of Kent.
  - Orfeo ( (Spain) Kingdom of Naples): Battle of the Downs: The 44-gun ship was lost on the Goodwin Sands, Kent.
  - San Agustin (Spanish Navy): Battle of the Downs: The full-rigged pinnace was driven ashore on the coast of Kent.
  - San Agustin ( (Spain) Kingdom of Naples): Battle of the Downs: The ship was driven ashore on the coast of Kent. She sank on 3 or 4 November.
  - San Antonio (Spanish Navy): Battle of the Downs: The full-rigged pinnace was driven ashore on the coast of Kent.
  - San Carlos ( (Spain) Dunkirk): Battle of the Downs: The ship was sunk in The Downs.
  - San Cristo de Burgos (Spanish Navy): Battle of the Downs: The ship was lost off the French coast.
  - San Daniel (Spanish Navy): Battle of the Downs: The ship was driven ashore on the coast of Kent.
  - San Jerónimo(Spanish Navy): Battle of the Downs: The ship was destroyed by fire in The Downs.
  - San Juan Bautista (Spanish Navy): Battle of the Downs: The ship was sunk in The Downs.
  - San Juan Evangelista (Hamburg): Battle of the Downs: The hired ship was driven ashore on the coast of Kent.
  - San Pedro de la Fortuna (Spain): Battle of the Downs: The hired ship was driven ashore on the coast of Kent. She was later refloated.
  - San Pedro Martir (Spain): Battle of the Downs: The hired ship was driven ashore on the coast of Kent.
  - Santa Agnes ( (Spain) Kingdom of Naples): Battle of the Downs: The frigate was driven ashore on the coast of Kent. She was refloated on 3 November.
  - Santa Catalina (Spanish Navy): Battle of the Downs: The ship was driven ashore on the coast of Kent.
  - Santa Theresa (Portuguese Navy): Battle of the Downs: The ship was destroyed by fire with great loss of life.
  - Santiago (Portuguese Navy): Battle of the Downs: The ship was driven ashore on the coast of Kent.
  - Santo Domingo de Polonia ( Polish–Lithuanian Commonwealth): Battle of the Downs: The hired ship was driven ashore on the coast of Kent.
  - Santo Thomas (Spanish Navy): Battle of the Downs: The ship was driven ashore on the coast of Kent.
  - Six ships ( Lübeck): Battle of the Downs: The ships were driven ashore on the coast of Kent.
  - Five fireships (Dutch Republic Navy) Battle of the Downs: The vessels were expended in the battle.
- 2 November – Santiago ( Castile): Battle of the Downs: The ship was destroyed by fire off Dover.
- 5 November – Unnamed ship (Spanish Navy): Battle of the Downs: The ship was driven ashore and wrecked at Dunkirk, France.

== 1641–1650 ==
=== 1641 ===
- 23 September – Merchant Royal (Kingdom of England): The Dartmouth based vessel foundered between Land's End, Cornwall and the Isles of Scilly.
- 4 November – Battle of Cape St. Vincent: The Fourth rate Zwaan (Dutch Republic Navy) was sunk in battle off Cape St. Vincent, Portugal.
- 26 November – Maria de Medici ( Dutch East India Company ): The pinnace in the service of Kamer van Amsterdam foundered off the southern end of the Island of Cu Lao Cham, Vietnam.
- Unknown date
  - Guldern Buys ( Dutch East India Company ): The vessel foundered at the southern end of the island of Cu Lao Cham, Vietnam after 19 October.
  - Draak ( Dutch East India Company ): The vessel was wrecked under cliffs at Poulo Wai, Cambodja.
  - Dragon (Kingdom of England): The East Indiaman was lost 120 miles (190 km) off Ceylon.

=== 1642 ===
- 7 July
  - Guise (France): Fell victim to one of her own fireships during the Battle of Barcelona.
  - Magdalena (Spain): Burnt by enemy action during the Battle of Barcelona, catching fire when the Guise (France) launched a fireship

=== 1643 ===
- 7 July – Wijdenes ( Dutch East India Company): The pinnace in the service of Kamer van Enkhuizen was attacked in the Dutch East Indies by local people and destroyed.

=== 1644 ===
- 13 October
  - Battle of Fehmarn: The fourth rate Delmenhorst (Royal Dano-Norwegian Navy) was burnt in battle off Fehmarn.
  - Battle of Fehmarn: The third rate Lindormen (Royal Dano-Norwegian Navy) was burnt in battle off Fehmarn.
  - Battle of Fehmarn: The sixth rate yacht Høyenhald (Royal Dano-Norwegian Navy) was sunk in battle off Fehmarn.

=== 1645 ===
- July – John (England): The Royalist vessel ran ashore after a skirmish with three Parliamentary ships. She was the flagship of the pirate John Mucknell.

=== 1646 ===
- 1 August
  - Breskens ( Dutch East India Company): The pinnace was lost in a sea battle against the Spanish near the Bay of Tigaol, Strait of San Bernardino, Philippines.
  - Visser ( Dutch East India Company): The galjoot was lost in a sea battle against the Spanish in the Strait of San Bernardino, Philippines.
  - Two Fire ships (Dutch Republic): Lost in a sea battle against the Spanish in the Strait of San Bernardino, Philippines.

=== 1648 ===
- May – Harleem ( Dutch East India Company): The galliot sank off the Salt River, Table Bay, while carrying china, silver, coins, etc. from Batavia. In 1883 Colonel Robley salvaged some of the cargo including china which was uninjured.
- 10 August – Brak ( Dutch East India Company): The galjoot was wrecked off the Ganges.

=== 1649 ===
- 30 January – Garland (Royal Navy): While carrying garments and other possessions of the late Charles I, together with some personal belongings of his fugitive Queen, and the wardrobe of the Prince of Wales, the Topsham ship was wrecked at Godrevy in St Ives Bay. She was taking shelter off St Ives, Cornwall in a great storm dragging her anchors. Only a man, boy and wolf–dog survived out of about sixty passengers and crew.
- Spring – Antelope (Kingdom of England): Second English Civil War: The Middling ship was captured by Happy Entrance (Kingdom of England) and was burnt.

=== 1650 ===
- October – Liberty (England): The 44-gun second rate great ship ran aground and was wrecked off Harwich, Essex.

== 1651–1660 ==
=== 1650s ===
- Believed to be between 1650 and 1660, an unidentified vessel called the Palmwood shipwreck.

=== 1651 ===
- 10 May – Unidentified vessel: Wrecked on St Mary's, Isles of Scilly.
- Two unidentified Royalist frigates anchored under Hugh Hill (now the Garrison) and blockaded the island of St Mary's, Isles of Scilly. It is said they were driven ashore in a storm and thought to be total wrecks (not confirmed by research).

=== 1652 ===
- 20 July – Koe ( Dutch East India Company ): The ship ran aground on the Chinese coast at Zhangzhou, while en route to Tayouan from Batavia.
- 16 August – Battle of Plymouth: The fireship Charity ( Commonwealth Navy) was expended in battle off Plymouth, Devon.
- 28 October
  - Burgh van Alkmaar (Dutch Republic Navy): Battle of the Kentish Knock: The ship exploded and sank.
  - Three ships (Dutch Republic Navy): Battle of the Kentish Knock: The ships were sunk in the battle.

=== 1653 ===
- 28 February
  - Battle of Portland: The hired ship Arke Trojane (Dutch Republic Navy) was sunk in battle off Portland, Dorset, England.
  - Battle of Portland: The hired ship Kroon Imperiaal (Dutch Republic Navy) was sunk in battle off Portland.
  - Battle of Portland: The hired ship Meerman (Dutch Republic Navy) was sunk in battle off Portland.
  - Battle of Portland: The hired ship Faam (Dutch Republic Navy) was sunk in battle off Portland.
  - Battle of Portland: The fifth rate Frisia (Dutch Republic Navy) exploded and sank in battle off Portland.
- 3 June – Battle of the Gabbard: The fireship Koning David (Dutch Republic Navy) was expended in battle.
- June – Smient ( Dutch East India Company ): The flute was lost somewhere between Batavia and Formosa.
- 31 July
  - Battle of Scheveningen: The fourth rate Hollandia (Dutch Republic Navy) was sunk in battle off Scheveningen.
  - Battle of Scheveningen: The fourth rate Zevenwolden (Dutch Republic Navy) was sunk in battle off Scheveningen.
- 16 August – Sperwer ( Dutch East India Company ): The pinnace was wrecked on Cheju Island, Korea with the loss of twenty-eight crew.
- 13 September
  - Martha and Margaret ( Commonwealth of England): One of three ships lost during a gale while attempting to take Duart Castle on the Isle of Mull.
  - Speedwell ( Commonwealth of England): Foundered during a storm while attempting to take Duart Castle on the Isle of Mull. Twenty-two lost their lives.
  - Swan ( Commonwealth Navy): The frigate foundered during a gale when attempting to take Duart Castle on the Isle of Mull. The wreck was found in 1979.
- November
  - 38 ships – Due to a four-day storm on the coast of the Dutch Republic, 23 ships lost their masts and fifteen sank. Almost 1,400 men drowned.
- Unknown date – Zeemeeuw ( Dutch East India Company : The pinnace, out of Ternate, was wrecked 8 miles (13 km) east of Batavia.

=== 1654 ===
- 6–7 January
  - Due to a two-day storm on the coast of the Dutch Republic, at least 20 ships sank. Around 200 men drowned.
    - Lelie ( Dutch East India Company):
- 16 May
  - Battle of the Dardanelles: The hired armed ship Aquila d'Oro (Venetian Navy) was burnt in the Dardanelles to avoid capture by the Ottoman Navy.
  - Battle of the Dardanelles: The hired armed ship Orsola Bonaventura (Venetian Navy) was sunk in battle in the Dardanelles.
  - Battle of the Dardanelles: The galley Paduana (Venetian Navy) was sunk in the Dardanelles.
- 13 July – Goede Hoop ( Dutch East India Company): The ship was lost off Amboina while in the service of the Kamer van Amsterdam.
- 9 August – Tayouan ( Dutch East India Company): The pinnace was lost off Formosa when she lost her anchors while unloading, drifted and ran aground. The cargo and crew were saved.

=== 1656 ===
- March – Primrose: the sixth rate, 22 gun English man-o'-war, lost her main topmast off Land's End and drifted onto the Seven Stones Reef. Along with the Mayflower, she was searching the area between Cornwall and the Isles of Scilly for two Spanish frigates, which had captured a vessel bound for Bristol. She managed to free herself from the reef and sank in 60 fathoms (110 m) taking, sixteen men, two women and a child with her.
- 28 April – Vergulde Draeck ( Dutch East India Company): The pinnace broke in two when she ran aground on the north-west coast of Australia, at Ledge Point with the loss of one hundred and eighteen crew.
  - Battle of the Dardanelles: The hired armed ship Arma di Nassau (Venetian Navy) was burnt in the Dardanelles to prevent capture by the Ottoman Navy.
  - Battle of the Dardanelles: The fourth rate San Marco (Venetian Navy) was burnt in the Dardanelles to prevent capture by the Ottoman Navy.
  - Battle of the Dardanelles: The hired armed ship San Pietro (Venetian Navy) was burnt in the Dardanelles to prevent capture by the Ottoman Navy.
- 19 July – Hulst ( Dutch East India Company): The fluyt, was lost off Nusa Untelue while en route from Solor.
- 11 September – Maarssen ( Dutch East India Company): The pinnace was lost in a typhoon while in harbour at Formosa.
- 2 December – Tulp ( Dutch East India Company): The frigate ran aground on Madagascar.

=== 1658 ===
- 9 February – Princess Maria ( Commonwealth Navy): The ship was wrecked on the Brake Sand, in the North Sea off the coast of Essex.
- Unknown date – Aleppo Merchant ( Commonwealth of England): The Levant Company ship was wrecked on the approaches to the River Camel at Treyarnon Bay, on the north Cornwall coast, while on passage from Smyrna for London.

=== 1659 ===
- 23 June – Avondster ( Dutch East India Company): The pinnace broke in two when she ran aground, in the Bay of Galle, Celyon after dragging her anchors. Her cargo of areca nuts was salvaged.
- Unknown date – Unidentified vessel ( Dutch East India Company): The vessel was wrecked off Sennen Cove, Cornwall with a cargo of silver ingots.

=== 1660 ===
- 2 September – Workum ( Dutch East India Company): The pinnace was wrecked near Macao with one hundred and twenty-eight people aboard.
- Unknown date – An unnamed man-of-war (French Navy) was wrecked in Table Bay.

== 1661–1670 ==
=== 1661 ===
- April – Koning David ( Dutch East India Company): The pinnace was lost off Pegu, Burma.
- 17 August – Urk ( Dutch East India Company): The frigate ran aground while engaged in battle with the Chinese military leader Coxinga north of Tayouan, off the River Soulang, Formosa.

=== 1662 ===
- 10 February – Wapen van Holland was one of seven ships on voyage from Batavia, Dutch East Indies to Amsterdam. The ship sank during a storm. It’s assumed nobody survived.
- 10 February – Gekroonde Leeuw was one of seven ships on voyage from Batavia, Dutch East Indies to Amsterdam. The ship sank during a storm. It’s assumed nobody survived.
- 10 February – Prins Willem was one of seven ships on voyage from Batavia, Dutch East Indies to Amsterdam. The ship sank during a storm near Madagascar. It’s assumed nobody survived.
- 11 February – Arnhem was one of seven ships on voyage from Batavia, Dutch East Indies to Amsterdam. The ship sank near St. Brandon. 98 crew members survived, at least 22 were killed.

=== 1663 ===
- 22 February – Ankeveen ( Dutch East India Company): The pinnace was lost off China.
- 15 May – Dolfijn ( Dutch East India Company): The pinnace was abandoned after springing a leak in the Bay of Galle, Ceylon. The wreck has been found.
- 26 August – Vollenhoven ( Dutch East India Company): The flute was lost off Mishima Islands, Japan while out of Batavia for Nagasaki, Japan.
- 16 November – Griffioen ( Dutch East India Company): The pinnace foundered.

=== 1665 ===
- 3 June
  - Battle of Lowestoft: The third rate Eendracht (Dutch Republic Navy) was sunk off Lowestoft, Suffolk, England by Royal Charles Royal Navy) with the loss of 404 of her 409 crew.
  - Battle of Lowestoft: The fifth rate Fame was expended as a fireship.
  - Battle of Lowestoft: The hired armed ship Maarseveen (Dutch Republic Navy) was burnt off Lowestoft by Wexford (Royal Navy) after she had struck her colours.
  - Battle of Lowestoft: The third rate Utrecht (Dutch Republic Navy) was burnt off Lowestoft.
- 4 June – Battle of Lowestoft: The sixth rate Bramble (Royal Navy) was expended as a fireship.
  - Battle of Cherchell: The fifth rate Cheval Blanc ( Algerian Navy) was sunk in battle.
  - Battle of Cherchell: The fifth rate Pot de Fleur ( Algerian Navy) was sunk in battle.
- December
  - Sea Horse ( East India Company): The East Indiaman was driven ashore and wrecked on the coast of County Mayo, Ireland with the loss of about 74 of her crew. About 100 crew survived. She was on a voyage from Middlesbrough, North Riding of Yorkshire to the East Indies.
  - Charity (Hamburg): The ship was captured and burnt off Cádiz, Spain by five Turkish vessels, one of which she sunk. Charity was on the Plymouth, England - Alicante, Spain leg of a voyage from Arkhangelsk, Tsardom of Russia to Livorno, Grand Duchy of Tuscany.
- 18 January – Royal Oak (England): The British East India Company vessel, while on her first voyage home from the Moluccas and Bantam to London, was lost (probably) on Pednathise Head within the Western Rocks, Isles of Scilly. Some of the crew managed to abandon ship and took to a ″low rock″ where they were rescued fifty-two hours later. She was carrying peppercorns, cloth and porcelain.
- 3 February – Graesmeger (Dutch Republic): The ship was destroyed by fire at Middelburg. Her crew were rescued.
- 8 March – London (England): exploded and sank off Southend with an estimated loss of three hundred people.

=== 1666 ===
- 31 May – Unnamed vessel (Portugal): The ship was driven ashore and wrecked at Plymouth, Devon, England with the loss of five of her crew. She was on a voyage from Portugal to London, England.
- 1 June
  - Duivenvoorde (Dutch Republic Navy) Four Days' Battle: The warship was burnt during the battle.
  - Hof van Zeeland (Dutch Republic Navy) Four Days' Battle: The fourth rate was burnt during the battle.
- 2 June
  - Black Eagle (Royal Navy): Four Days' Battle. The warship was sunk during the battle.
  - Liefde (Dutch Republic Navy): Four Days' Battle: The warship was burnt during the battle.
  - Loyal Subject (Royal Navy): Four Days' Battle: The warship was damaged beyond repair during the battle.
  - Saint Paul (Royal Navy): Four Days' Battle: The fourth rate was sunk in battle.
  - Spread Eagle (Royal Navy): Four Days' Battle. The fireship was expended in battle.
  - Spiegel (Dutch Republic Navy): Four Days' Battle: The warship was sunk during the battle.
  - Young Prince (Royal Navy): Four Day's Battle: The sixth rate was expended as a fireship.
- 3 June – Prince Royal (Royal Navy): Four Days' Battle: The warship ran aground on the Galloper Sand, in the North Sea off the coast of Essex. She was captured and burnt by the Dutch to avoid her being recaptured.
- 4 June
  - Black Bull (Royal Navy): Four Days' Battle: The fourth rate sank after being captured by Prins Hendrik Casimir (Dutch Republic Navy) due to damage sustained during the battle.
  - Gouden Ruiter (Dutch Republic Navy): Four Day's Battle: The fireship was expended in battle.
  - Hound (Royal Navy): Four Day's Battle: The fifth rate was expended as a fireship.
  - Landman (Dutch Republic Navy): Four Days' Battle: The fourth rate was burnt during the battle.
  - Little Unicorn (Royal Navy): Four Days' Battle: The fifth rate was expended as a fireship.
  - Rotterdam (Dutch Republic Navy): Four Day's Battle: The fireship was expended in battle.
- 9 July – La Vierge du Bon Port (France): The French East India Company ship was one of four sent to colonise Madagascar. She left for home on 20 February and within days of her destination of Le Havre, she was attacked by an English corsair and sank off Guernsey in the Channel Islands. At the time she was reported to be carrying a valuable cargo worth £1,500,000.
- 25 July
  - Great Gift (Royal Navy): St James's Day Battle: The fireship was expended in battle.
  - Resolution (Royal Navy): St. James's Day Battle: The third rate frigate ran aground during the battle. She was subsequently burnt by a Dutch fireship.
- 19 August
  - Dragon (England): Grounded during a raid on the Vlie estuary in the Netherlands. She refloated after jettisoning eight cannon and beer.
  - Fox (Royal Navy): Holmes's Bonfire: The fireship was expended in the raid on the Vlie.
  - Witte Kalf ( Dutch East India Company): The pinnace was set alight by English fire ships along with one hundred and fifty other ships in Vlie, Netherlands during an attack by the English.

=== 1667 ===
- March – Jonkheer ( Dutch East India Company): The vessel with a cargo of sugar, coffee, spices and Banca tin with a value of £50,000 was wrecked under Angrouse Cliff near Mullion Cove, Cornwall.
- 10 May
  - Battle of Nevis: The hired ship Coronation (Royal Navy) was sunk in battle off Nevis.
  - Battle of Nevis: The hired ship Saint Peter (Royal Navy) was sunk in battle off Nevis.
- 9 June – Second Anglo-Dutch War, Raid on the Medway: The fireship Susanna (Dutch Republic Navy) was expended in battle.
- 11 June – Raid on the Medway:
  - The fireship HMS Barbadoes Merchant (Royal Navy) was scuttled as a blockship. She was burnt by the Dutch on 14 June.
  - The fireship HMS Constant John (Royal Navy) was scuttled as a blockship. She was burnt by the Dutch on 14 June.
  - The hulk Crown and Brille (England) was burnt by the Dutch.
  - The fireship HMS Dolphin (Royal Navy) was scuttled as a blockship. She was burnt by the Dutch on 14 June.
  - The ketch HMS Edward and Eve (Royal Navy) was scuttled as a blockship. She was burnt by the Dutch on 14 June.
  - The dogger HMS Good Fortune (Royal Navy) was scuttled as a blockship. She was burnt by the Dutch on 14 June.
  - The fireship HMS John and Sarah (Royal Navy) was scuttled as a blockship. She was burnt by the Dutch on 14 June.
  - The fourth rate HMS Marmaduke (Royal Navy) was sunk as a blockship.
  - The ketch HMS The Hinde (Royal Navy) was scuttled as a blockship. She was burnt by the Dutch on 14 June.
  - The fireship HMS Unicorn (Royal Navy) was scuttled as a blockship. She was burnt by the Dutch on 14 June.

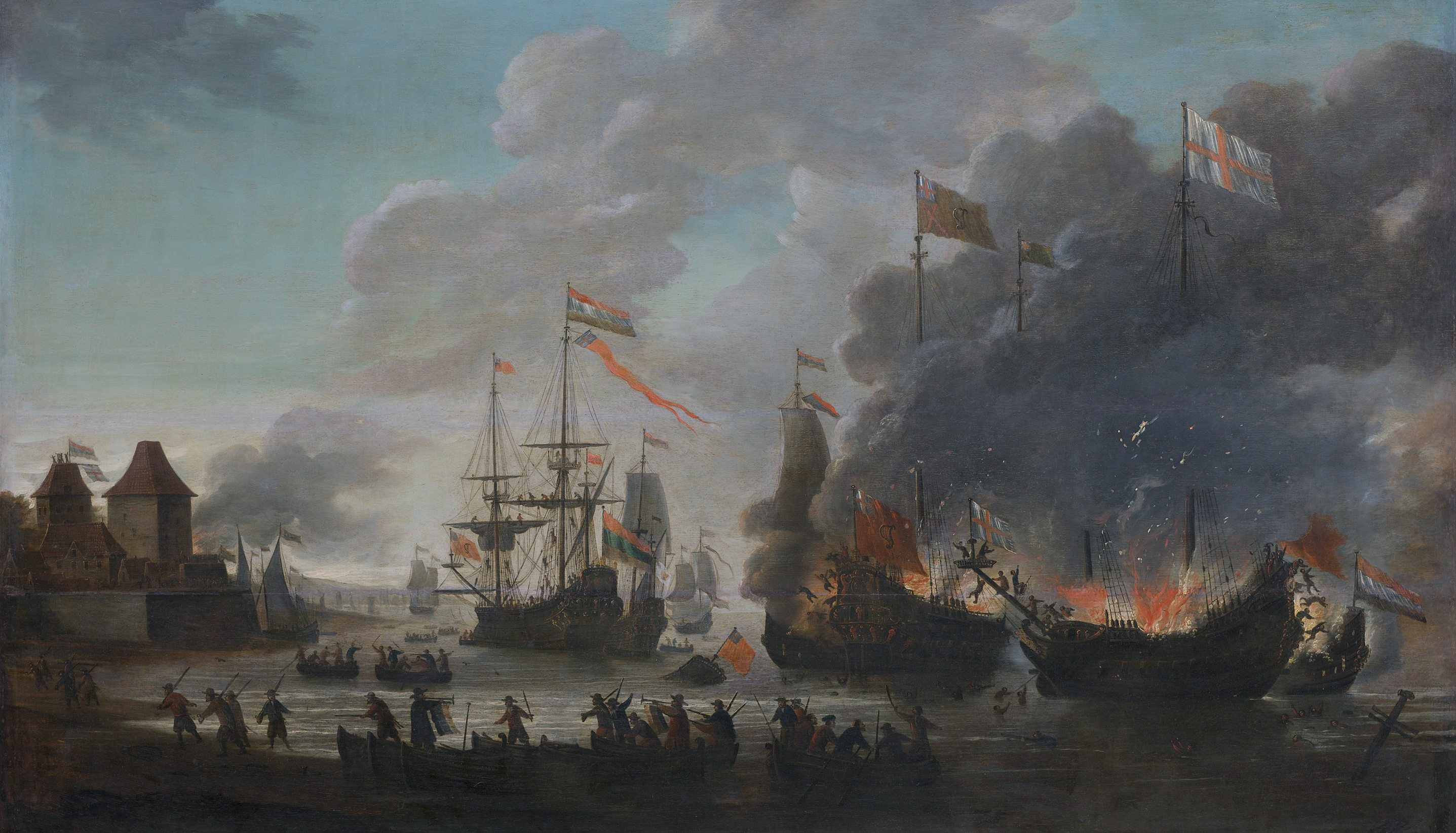
HMS Charles V and HMS Matthias

- 12 June – Raid on the Medway:
  - The guard ship HMS Charles V (Royal Navy) was burnt by the Dutch.
  - The guard ship HMS Matthias (Royal Navy) was burnt by the Dutch.
  - The guard ship HMS Sancta Maria (Royal Navy) was burnt by the Dutch.
  - The ship of the line HMS Vanguard (Royal Navy) was sunk as a blockship.
- 13 June – Raid on the Medway:
  - The second rate HMS Henry (Royal Navy) was driven ashore at Rochester Bridge, Kent.
  - The second rate HMS Loyal London (Royal Navy) was burnt by the Dutch.
  - The second rate HMS Royal James (Royal Navy) was burnt by the Dutch.
  - The first rate HMS Royal Oak (Royal Navy) was burnt by the Dutch.
- 22 July – HMS Helverson (Royal Navy) sank at Sheerness, Kent.
- October – Unidentified vessel: Ship carrying silver coin lost at Lizard Point, Cornwall.
- 22 December (first report) – Three unidentified ships: Lost near Scilly.
- (first report) – Unidentified vessel (Spain): Wrecked at an unknown location. A passenger complained that he was left on a rock for one or two days while the cargo was salvaged, saying "Valuing the goods more than my life".
- Unidentified vessel: An 800-ton ship (Genoa) with forty-eight guns and a value of £100,000 lost on The Lizard. This wreck may be the ship the Ferdinand Research Group discovered in 1969 below Angrouse Cliff near Mullion Cove (see March 1667 above).

=== 1668 ===
- 5 July – Liefde ( Dutch East India Company): The pinnace was wrecked off Baios de Padua with the loss of twenty-seven crew. She was en route for Ceylon to Persia.
- 30 July – Ooievaar ( Dutch East India Company): The flute ran aground in the Ganges, Bengal.
- 4 August – Geit ( Dutch East India Company): The pinnace was lost off Makassar, Sulawesi, Indonesia.
- 9 August – Purmerland ( Dutch East India Company): The pinnace was lost off Makassar, Sulawesi, Indonesia when her ammunition load exploded.
- 11 December – HMS Hind (Royal Navy): The sixth-rate ship was lost on Crim Rocks, Isles of Scilly.

=== 1669 ===
- January
  - John (England): The ship was wrecked on the Goodwin Sands, Kent. Her crew survived. She was on a voyage from Guinea to London.
  - Unnamed ship ( County of Flanders): The ship was wrecked on the Goodwin Sands.
  - Unnamed ship (Unknown flag): The ship was wrecked on the Goodwin Sands.
- Unknown date
  - Achilles ( Dutch East India Company): The pinnace was lost on a voyage to Japan.
  - San Salvador (France): Wrecked near the Lizard. This wreck may be the ship the Ferdinand Research Group discovered in 1969 below Angrouse Cliff near Mullion Cove (see 1667 above).

=== 1670 ===
- 21 August (first report) – Unidentified vessel: "A great ship has been lost about the Scillies, the afterpart of a wreck has been found".
- November
  - Unnamed ship ( County of Flanders): The East Indiaman was wrecked on the Goodwin Sands, Kent, England).
  - Unnamed ship (Dutch Republic): The East Indiaman was wrecked on the Goodwin Sands.
  - Kaneelboom ( Dutch East India Company): The pinnace left Bengal with silk on 18 November and foundered in a storm off Paleacatte, Coromandel with the loss of all hands.

== 1671–1680 ==
=== 1671 ===
- 8 May
  - Battle of Bugia: The fifth rate Little Victory (Royal Navy) was expended as a fireship against the Algerian Navy,
  - Battle of Bugia: The fireship Eagle (Royal Navy) was expended in battle against the Algerian Navy.
  - Battle of Bugia: The fireship Rose (Royal Navy) was expended in battle against the Algerian Navy.
- 8 August – Buienskerke ( Dutch East India Company): The flute ran aground off Galle, Ceylon.
- 7 November – Unidentified (England): Only the cabin boy survived when a Bristol ship, out of Barbados was wrecked near Pedn-mên-du, a headland to the west of Sennen Cove, Cornwall.
- Unknown date – Crown (England): The East India Company vessel was lost on voyage to Formosa.

=== 1672 ===
- 24 March
  - Klein Hollandia (Dutch Republic Navy) sank off Eastbourne, Sussex, England. The wreck was discovered in 2019 and identified in 2026.
- 28 May

Royal James

  - Battle of Solebay: The fireship Alice and Francis was expended in the battle.
  - Battle of Solebay: The third rate Jozua (Dutch Republic Navy) was sunk off Southwold, Suffolk, England.
  - First Battle of Schooneveld: The fireship Providence was expended in battle.
  - First Battle of Schooneveld: The fireship Providence was expended in battle.
  - First Battle of Schooneveld: The fireship Rachel was expended in battle.
  - Battle of Solebay: The first rate Royal James (Royal Navy) was destroyed by fire during the battle.
- 4 June – Second Battle of Schooneveld: The fourth rate Welcome (Royal Navy) was expended as a fireship.
- 2 August – Culemborg ( Dutch East India Company): The vessel was lost during a storm off Quelang, Keelung, on the north coast of Formosa.
- 11 August – Battle of Texel: The sixth rate Truelove was expended as a fireship.

=== 1673 ===
- 20 February – Grundel ( Dutch East India Company): The ship was lost little to the eastward of Cape Hangklip near False Bay, South Africa.
- 25 February – Écueil (French Navy): The fourth-rate ship of the line sank off Puerto Rico.
- February – Wapen van Hoorn ( Dutch East India Company): The frigate wrecked off England, while out of Texel, Netherlands.
- 16 April – Westwoude ( Dutch East India Company): The flute was lost in the Bay of Bengal, off Bengal.
- 21 August – Arrogant (French Navy): The fire ship was used at the Battle of Texel, off Texel, Netherlands.
- 23 August – Zoetendaal ( Dutch East India Company): The flute, en route for Batavia from Texel foundered 50 miles (80 km) from the Cape of Good Hope.
- Unknown date
  - Anne (Royal Navy): The 52-gun Speaker-class frigate was accidentally blown up.
  - Faucon (French Navy): The fifth-rate ship sank off Formentera in the Balearic Islands.

=== 1674 ===
- 18 January
  - Nightingale (Royal Navy): The sixth rate was wrecked on the Goodwin Sands, Kent.
  - Unnamed ship (Dutch Republic): The 12-gun caper was wrecked on the Goodwin Sands.
- 30 November – Revenge: Wrecked with the loss of fifteen of her seventeen crew off the Seven Stones Reef, in the English Channel.

=== 1675 ===
- 21 February – Unidentified: Wrecked in the Isles of Scilly.
- 24 August – Florentine (England): The ship was wrecked on the Goodwin Sands, Kent due to an earthquake.

=== 1676 ===
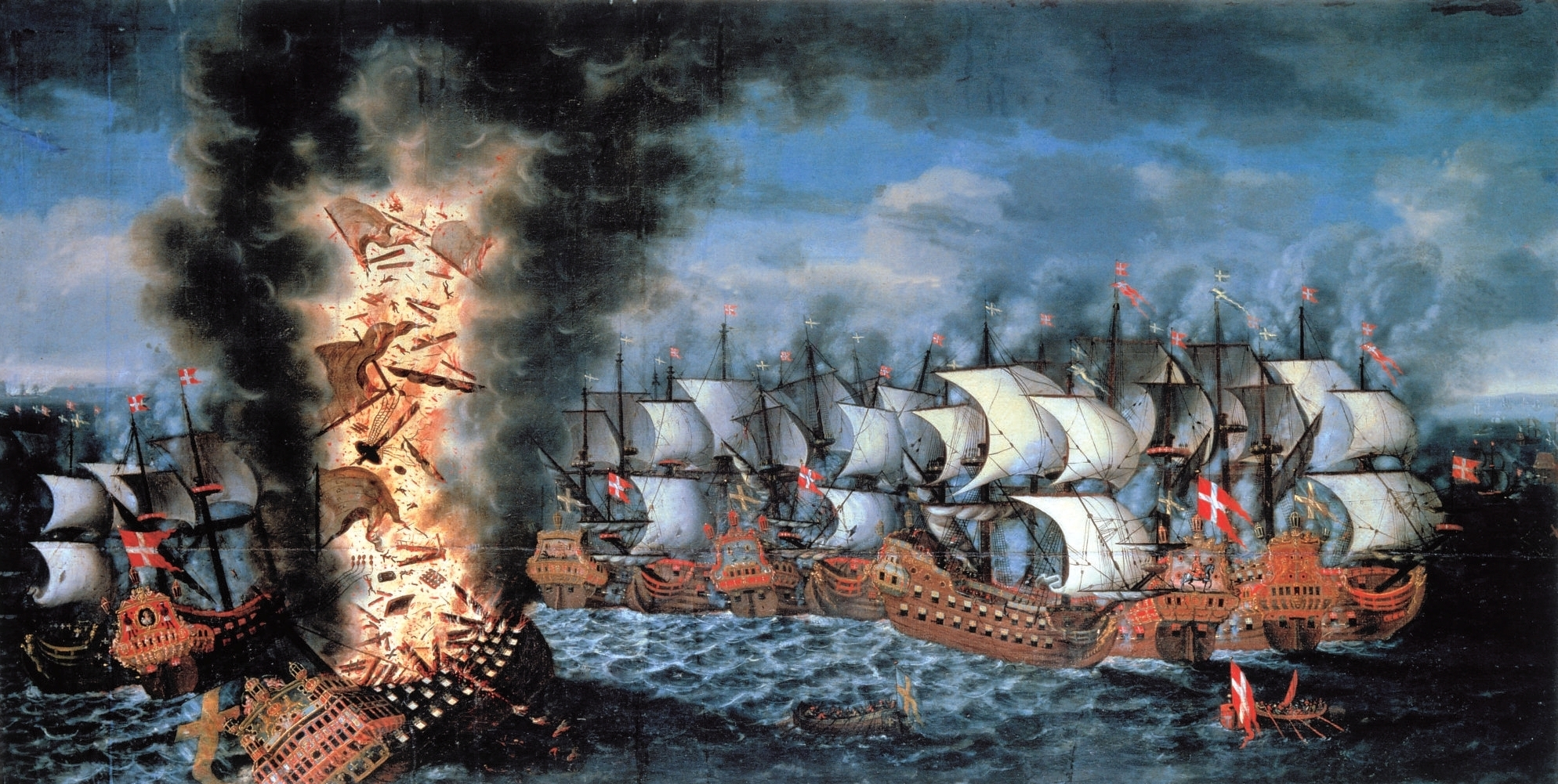
Kronan (left) and Svärdet (right)

- 1 June
  - HSwMS Kronan Swedish Navy: Battle of Öland: The ship of the line capsized, exploded and sank with the loss of about 600 of her 650 crew.
  - HSwMS Rödkrita (Swedish Navy): Battle of Öland: The fireship was burnt to avoid capture.
  - HSwMS Svärdet (Swedish Navy): Battle of Öland: The War ship was lost after the battle.
- 2 June
  - Battle of Palermo: Eclair (French Navy): The fire ship was lost off Sicily after the battle.
  - Battle of Palermo: The fourth rate Leiden (Dutch Republic Navy) was sunk off Palermo, Sicily.
  - Battle of Palermo: The second rate Nuestra Señora del Pilar (Spanish Navy) was burnt during the battle.
  - Battle of Palermo: the fourth rate San Antonio de Napoles (Spanish Navy) was burnt during the battle.
  - Battle of Palermo: The fourth rate San Carlos (Spanish Navy) was burnt during the battle.
  - Battle of Palermo: The fourth rate San Felipe (Spanish Navy) was burnt during the battle.
  - Battle of Palermo: The fourth rate San Salvador (Spanish Navy) was burnt during the battle.
  - Battle of Palermo: The third rate Santa Ana (Spanish Navy) was burnt during the battle.
  - Battle of Palermo: The third rate Steenbergen (Dutch Republic Navy) was sunk in the battle.
  - Battle of Palermo: The third rate Vrijheid (Dutch Republic Navy) was sunk off Palermo.
- 26 August – Unknown vessel: Wrecked off Seal Island, Nova Scotia.

=== 1677 ===
- 3 March
  - Battle of Tobago: Alcion (Dutch Republic Navy): The sixth rate was sunk off Tobago, West Indies.
  - Battle of Tobago: Glorieux (French Navy): During the Franco-Dutch War and in a battle to control the island of Tobago, the flagship third rate caught fire and sank with the loss of approximately sixty lives.
  - Battle of Tobago: Le Marquis (French Navy): : The fourth-rate frigate exploded during a battle to control the island of Tobago, West Indies.
  - Battle of Tobago: Middelburg (Dutch Republic Navy): The fourth rate was sunk off Tobago.
- 1 June – Battle of Møn: The hired armed ship Kalmar Kastell (Swedish Navy) was sunk off Møn, Denmark.
- 31 August
  - Damiate ( Dutch East India Company): The pinnace was wrecked when she hit rocks to the east of Madura, Java. Eighteen people lost their lives.
  - Pagadeth ( Dutch East India Company): The hoeker ran aground to the east of Madura, Java.

=== 1678 ===
- Horstemeer ( Dutch East India Company): The frigate was lost in the South Atlantic on her maiden voyage from Texel, Netherlands.

=== 1679 ===
- Le Griffon – (New France): With a crew of six on board, the barque departed Green Bay on Lake Michigan bound for the Niagara River with a cargo of furs on 18 September and was never seen or heard from again.
- Unknown vessel: Wrecked on the Western Rocks, Isles of Scilly.

=== 1680 ===
- 11 January – Phoenix: The East India Company ship carrying white pepper and cloth wrecked on the Western Rocks, Isles of Scilly. Much of the cargo was salvaged and sold on Scilly to Thomas Abney who paid £202 8s 1d for 269 pieces of Peerlongs.

== 1681–1690 ==
=== 1681 ===
- December – (Kingdom of England): A cargo vessel was wrecked off St Agnes, Isles of Scilly. The lighthouse keeper on St Agnes was found guilty of negligence for being inattentive to the light, and for plundering some of the cargo.
- 29 November - 3 December
  - Nuestra Señora de Encarnación (Spain) - Spanish Nao Carrack of the 1681 Flota de Tierra Firme off the mouth of the Chagres River near present-day Panama.
  - Boticaria (Spain) - Spanish Nao Carrack of the 1681 Flota de Tierra Firme near the Isla de Naranjos near present-day Panama.
  - Nuestra Señora de la Soledad (Spain) - Spanish Galleon of the 1681 Flota de Tierra Firme under Antonio de Lima sank near present-day Panama.
  - Chaperon (Spain) - Nao carrack of the 1681 Flota de Tierra Firme near present-day Panama.
- Unknown date – Unknown vessel: Wrecked on St Agnes, Isles of Scilly.

=== 1682 ===
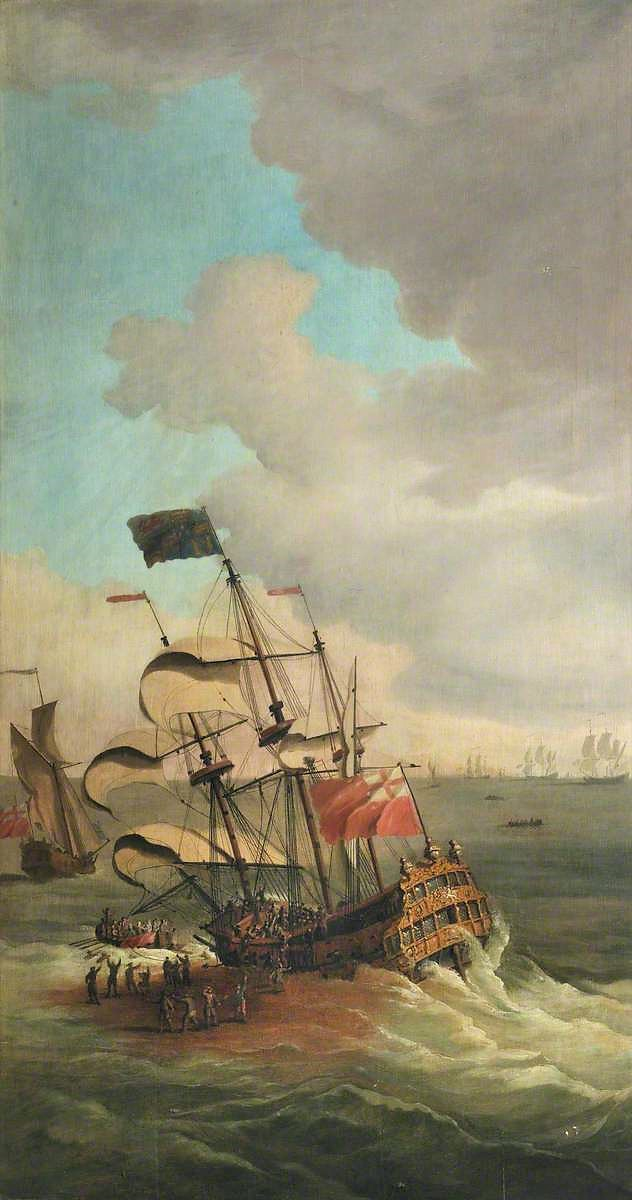
HMS Gloucester

- 6 May – HMS Gloucester (Royal Navy) - The Speaker-class frigate ran aground off Great Yarmouth, Norfolk and was wrecked with the loss of about 120 lives.
- May – Santa Teresa (Spain) - Spanish Nao Carrack of the 1681 Flota de Tierra Firme under Don Manuel de Galarza sank en route to Havana.
- 8 June – Johanna ( East India Company ): The East Indiaman was wrecked near Cape Agulhas, Cape Colony with the loss of ten of the 114 people on board.
- Unknown date – HMS Henry (Royal Navy) - The second rate was destroyed by fire.
- Unknown date – Nuestra Señora de la Concepción y San Ignacio de Loyola (Spain) - Spanish galleon of the 1681 Tierra Firme Fleet sank on approach to Havana at Cape San Antonio.

=== 1683 ===
- 11 February – Unknown: An unnamed ship foundered in Mount's Bay off Porthleven, Cornwall, and her captain Jonathan Hide drowned.

=== 1684 ===
- 9 February – President ( British East India Company): An East Indiaman ran aground on Loe Bar, Mount's Bay, Cornwall. She was carrying a valuable cargo of spices, indigo, drugs, textiles, pepper, diamonds and ″Jewish Treasure of Pearl″. More of the wreck was uncovered, following storms, in 2018.
- 4 April – Schiedam (Royal Navy): A Dutch built fluit and, at the time of sinking a sixth rate transport ship of the English fleet, wrecked at Jangye Ryn near Gunwalloe Church Cove, Mount's Bay, Cornwall.
- 1 September – 't Huis Te Kleef ( Dutch East India Company): The pinnace was lost off Duizend Eilanden, while en route to Palembang, Sumatra from Batavia.

=== 1686 ===
- 16 February 1686 the Stavenisse of the ( Dutch East India Company): on her return voyage from India to Europe, was wrecked on the African coast about seventy English miles south of the Bay of Natal (Durban). The ship lost its cargo of pepper.
- February – Prinses Maria ( Dutch East India Company): The ship sank in shallow water near Silver Carn, north of Santaspery Neck within the Western Rocks, Isles of Scilly. King James II sent his yacht to salvage some of the cargo and in 1973 a diving team recovered real coins, iron cannon and timbers.
- 4 July – Golden Fleece: The pirate ship sank after a battle with English warships in Samana Bay, Hispaniola.
- 13 September – Unknown: Lost on the Isles of Scilly.
- Unknown date – La Belle (France): The barque-longue was wrecked in Matagorda Bay with the loss of 21 of the 27 people on board.

=== 1688 ===
- 29 November – Tobias Leidsman ( Dutch East India Company): The ship was wrecked at Hanglip, Shetlands while en route to Batavia.

=== 1689 ===
- 2 January – HMS Sedgemoor (Royal Navy): The fourth rate was driven ashore and wrecked at South Foreland, Kent.
- 30 July – Railleuse (France): Was lost in a battle against English ships in the English Channel while on convoy duty from Le Havre to Brest.
- 18 November – Unknown: Lost on St Mary's, Isles of Scilly.
- 27 November – Walcheren (Dutch Republic Navy): The vessel capsized and sank on the western side of Vlissingen harbour, twenty-four crew lost their lives.

=== 1690 ===
- 16 January the galiot Noord of the ( Dutch Cape Colony): wrecked at Algoa Bay
- 10 July
  - HMS Anne (Royal Navy): Battle of Beachy Head: The 70-gun third rate ship of the line was burnt after the battle.
  - Elswoud (Dutch Republic Navy): Battle of Beachy Head: The severely damaged third rate was burnt after the battle.
  - Friesland (Dutch Republic Navy): Battle of Beachy Head: The 68-gun third rate ship of the line was captured by the French. She was subsequently burnt and sunk.
  - Gekroonde Burcht (Dutch Republic Navy): Battle of Beachy Head: The severely damaged second rate was burnt after the battle.
  - Kroonvogel (Dutch Republic Navy): Battle of Beachy Head: The fireship was sunk in battle.
  - Maagd van Enkhuizen (Dutch Republic Navy): Battle of Beachy Head: The severely damaged third rate fireship was burnt after the battle.
  - Nordermolen (Dutch Republic Navy): Battle of Beachy Head: The severely damaged ship was burnt after the battle.
  - Noorderkwartier (Dutch Republic Navy): Battle of Beachy Head: The second rate was sunk in the battle.
  - Suikermolen (Dutch Republic Navy): Battle of Beachy Head: The fireship was sunk in battle.
  - Tholen (Dutch Republic Navy): Battle of Beachy Head: The severely damaged third rate was burnt after the battle.
  - Utrecht (or Wapen van Utrecht) (Dutch Republic Navy): Battle of Beachy Head: The third rate sank due to damage sustained in the battle.
- 8 August – Elisabeth ( Dutch East India Company): The galjoot was lost off Palau Rakit, while out of Makassar, Sulawesi.
- 9 October – HMS Dartmouth (Royal Navy): The fifth-rate frigate ran aground in the Sound of Mull, Scotland after her anchor cables parted.
- Unknown date – HMS Vanguard (Royal Navy): The second rate ran aground on the Goodwin Sands, Kent. She was refloated.

== 1691–1700 ==
=== 1691 ===
- 3 September – HMS Coronation, (Royal Navy): The second-rate ship of the line driven aground at Lady Cove Penlee Point on Rame Head, Cornwall while at anchor, in a south-east gale, with the loss of approximately six hundred lives.
- 1 November – Rose, (Royal Navy): The chartered troop transport Rose of Chester, sailing down the River Shannon out of Cork for France carrying Irish Williamite troops, hit a rock, with the loss of one hundred and twenty lives.
- Winter of 1690–91 – Crowned Raven (Dutch Republic): The ship foundered in Eddrachillis Bay. She was on a voyage from the Baltic to a Portuguese port.

=== 1692 ===
- 4 June
  - Battle of La Hogue: Cadiz Merchant (Royal Navy): The fireship was expended in battle.
  - Battle of La Hogue: Extravagant (Royal Navy): The fireship was expended in battle.
  - Battle of La Hogue: Fort (French Navy): The fourth rate was burnt in the battle.
  - Battle of La Hogue: Foudroyant (French Navy): The second rate was burnt in the battle.
  - Battle of La Hogue: Fox (Royal Navy): The fireship was expended in battle.
  - Battle of La Hogue: Half Moon (Royal Navy): The sixth rate was expended in battle as a fireship.
  - Battle of La Hogue: Hopewell (Royal Navy): The fireship was expended in battle.
  - Battle of La Hogue: L'Ambitieux (French Navy): The second rate was burnt in the battle.
  - Battle of La Hogue: Le Bourbon (French Navy): The third rate was burnt in the battle.
  - Battle of La Hogue: Le Fier (French Navy): The second rate was burnt in the battle.
  - Battle of La Hogue: Le Gaillard (French Navy): The third rate was burnt in the battle.
  - Battle of La Hogue: Le Magnifique (French Navy): The second rate was burnt in the battle.
  - Battle of La Hogue: Le Saint Jacques (French Navy): The third rate was burnt in the battle.
  - Battle of La Hogue: Le Saint Philippe (French Navy): The first rate was burnt in the battle.
  - Battle of La Hogue: Le Terrible (French Navy): The second rate was burnt in the battle.
  - Battle of La Hogue: Le Tonnant (French Navy): The second rate was burnt in the battle.
  - Battle of La Hogue: Merveilleux (French Navy): The first rate was burnt in the battle.
  - Battle of La Hogue: Phaeton (Royal Navy): The fifth rate was expended in battle as a fireship.
  - Battle of La Hogue: Thomas and Elizabeth (Royal Navy): The fireship was expended in battle.
- 12 September – Waterland ( Dutch East India Company): The spiegelretour sank near Bordeaux in the Bay of Biscay, after being attacked by the French with the loss of all on board.

=== 1693 ===
- 9 February
  - Battle of the Oinousses Islands: The fourth rate Drago Volante-class ship of the line Drago Volante (Venetian Navy) was sunk in the battle.
  - Battle of the Oinousses Islands: The third rate San Lorenzo Zustinian-class ship of the line Stella Maris (Venetian Navy) was sunk in the battle.
  - Battle of the Oinousses Islands: The third rate Giove Fulminante-class ship of the line Leon Coronato (Venetian Navy) was sunk in the battle.
- 28 April – HMS Windsor Castle (Royal Navy): The second rate was wrecked on the Goodwin Sands, Kent. Her crew survived.

=== 1695 ===
- 5 July – HMS Charles (Royal Navy): The 6-gun fireship was burnt at Saint-Malo.
- Unknown date – Unidentified vessel (Dutch Republic): The cargo vessel was wrecked on St Michael's Mount in Mount's Bay, Cornwall and ″torn to pieces by the local people″.

=== 1696 ===
- 17 June
  - Battle of Dogger Bank: The sixth rate frigate Arend (Dutch Republic Navy) was burnt after being captured in the battle.
  - Battle of the Dogger Bank: The fourth rate Graaf van Solms (Dutch Republic Navy) was burnt after being captured in the battle.
  - Battle of Dogger Bank: The fourth rate Soestdijk (Dutch Republic Navy) was burnt after being captured in the battle.
- 23 July – Koning Willem ( Dutch East India Company): The frigate ran aground on the Flemish Banks near the Scheldt Estuary, North Sea.
- 11 September – HMS Sapphire, (Royal Navy): The fifth-rate frigate sank off Bay Bulls, Newfoundland during a battle with the French.

=== 1697 ===
- 23 July – Bronstee ( Dutch East India Company): The flute was lost on this date.

=== 1698 ===
- 15 August – Honselaarsdijk ( Dutch East India Company): The frigate foundered when she reached her destination of Batavia. She was carrying timber from Japara.
- Unknown date – HMS Seahorse (Royal Navy): The fireship was sunk as a breakwater at Chatham Dockyard, Kent. The ship was excavated and broken up in 1871.

=== 1699 ===
- June – Mirotvorets (Миротворец, 'Vredemaker', Imperial Russian Navy): The bomb vessel ran aground in the Don delta. She was refloated by the end of November.
- 23 November – Merkury (Меркурий, 'Mercurius', Imperial Russian Navy): The ship ran aground and sank in the Don delta. She was refloated in May 1700, repaired and returned to service.

== Unknown date ==
- De Zwaan (Dutch Republic). The 1636-built fluyt foundered in the Baltic Sea. The wreck was discovered in 2020.

== Sources ==
- Historic England, "Rill Cove (1000046)", National Heritage List for England
