= Nuestra Señora del Juncal =

Nuestra Señora del Juncal was a Spanish galleon that sank off the coast of Mexico on 1 November 1631. She was the flagship of the Spanish treasure fleet en route to Seville in Spain loaded with a valuable cargo when she foundered in storms between Veracruz and Havana. Of the 300 people on board, only 39 survived.

The ship remains one of the world's most sought-after wrecks but as of 2025 has not been located despite a number of searches.

== 1631 fleet ==
The 1631 Flota de Nueva España was exceptionally laden following a pause in sailings after the capture of the entire 1628 fleet by Dutch admiral Piet Hein at the Battle in the Bay of Matanzas. The 19 ships were carrying 3,644,198 pesos in silver and gold, 5,408 arrobas (135,200 pounds (61,300 kg)) of cochineal, 3,879 arrobas (96,975 pounds (43,987 kg)) of inferior cochineal, 15,413 arrobas (385,325 pounds (174,780 kg)) of indigo (probably Indigofera tinctoria), 10,018 pounds (4,544 kg) of Chinese silk, 71,788 hide (skin), 6,858 quintales (685,800 pounds (311,100 kg)) of Caesalpinia echinata (brazilwood), 7,972 quintales (797,200 pounds (361,600 kg)) of Haematoxylum campechianum (palo de Campeche in Spanish), 119 boxes of chocolate, and 91 quintales (9,100 pounds (4,100 kg)) of molasses.

== Shipwreck ==
Commanded by Admiral Manuel Serrano, the fleet left Vera Cruz for Havana and Spain on 14 October 1631. A week after leaving port, a storm (presumed to be atropical cyclone) struck the fleet, and no vessel emerged intact. Nuestra Señora del Juncal, sank 8 leagues north of "Bajo de las Áreas" (precise location unknown), and of the 335 persons aboard her only 35 survived after escaping in a small boat. The Spanish never located the wreck nor salvaged any of its cargo.

== See also ==
- Nuestra Señora de Encarnación
- List of shipwrecks in the 17th century
