= Éclair (disambiguation) =

An éclair is a long, cream-filled French pastry. It takes its name from the French word for lightning. Éclair or éclair may also refer to:

== People ==
- Jenny Eclair, British comedian

== Arts, entertainment, and media ==
=== Books ===
- Éclair (manga), a manga anthology series

=== Fictional characters ===
- Chef Eclair, a character in Nexo Knights
- Cure Eclair, a character in Star Detective Precure!
- Éclair (Kiddy Grade), an anime character
- Éclair, a character from the anime Dog Days
- Eclair, a princess in the game La Pucelle Tactics
- Lightning (Final Fantasy), Éclair "Lightning" Farron is the main character of the video game Final Fantasy XIII

=== Opera ===
- L'Éclair, an opéra comique in 3 acts by Fromental Halévy
- Les Éclairs, 2021 opera by Philippe Hersant.

== Brands and enterprises ==
- Eclair (company), a French film production and camera manufacturing company
- Cadbury Eclairs, confectionery made by Cadbury

== Ships ==
- Eclair, a French fire ship at the Battle of Palermo on 2 June 1676
- French gun-vessel Eclair
- HMS Eclair, several ships of the name

== Other uses ==
- Android Eclair, version 2.0–2.1 of the Android mobile operating system
- Éclair (typeface)
- ECLAIR, a commercial static code analysis tool developed by BUGSENG
- Éclair AC, an association football club from Haiti
- L'Éclair (automobile), the first car to participate in a motor race with pneumatic tyres

== See also ==
- Éclaires, a commune in northeastern France
