= Malacca Banks =

The Malacca Banks are sandbanks (shoals) below the sea surface, in the Gulf of Khambhat in Gujarat, India. They lie to the west and southwest of the port of Surat and are a system of four irregular ridges running roughly from north to south parallel with the entrance channels to the Gulf. They extend from 21°10′00″N 72°25′00″E to 20°20′00″N 72°10′00″E.

Malacca Bank proper refers only to the one of these banks, the second from the west. To the east of this bank is the Sutherland Channel (which is bounded on its east by the Snally Bank) and to west of the banks is the Grant Channel (which is bounded to its west by the Goapnauth Shoal). Unconnected to these is the Mal Bank which lies at the top of the Gulf of Khambhat where the Sabarmati and Mahi rivers converge.

== Further references ==
- William Henry Rosser, James Frederick Imray. The Seaman's Guide to the Navigation of the Indian Ocean and China Sea Including a Description of the Wind, Storms, Tides, Currents, &c., Sailing Directions; a Full Account of All the Islands; with Notes on Making Passages During the Different Seasons. J. Imray & Son, 1867. p. 407.
