= Sennen Cove =

Coastal village in Cornwall, England

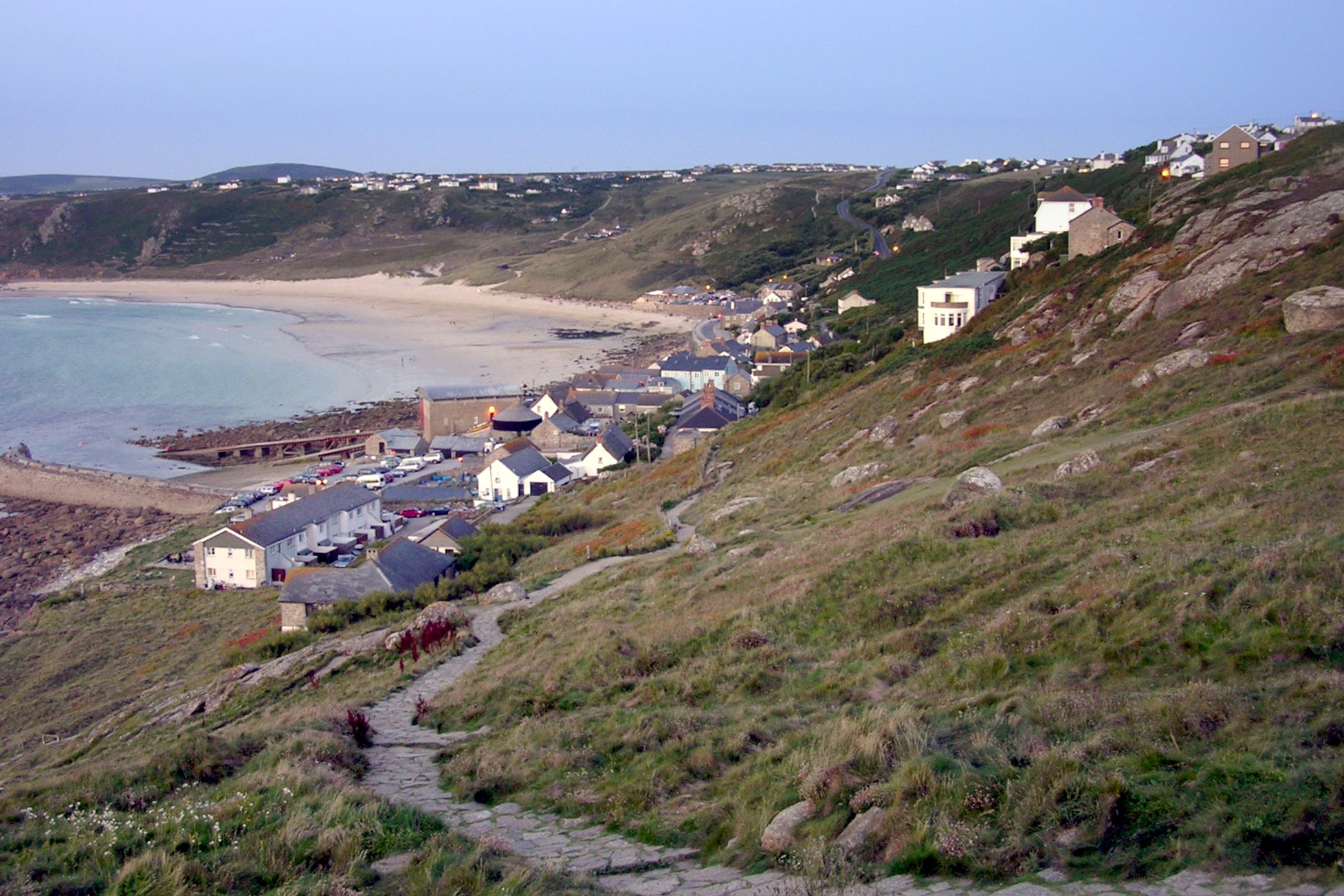
Sennen Cove at dusk from the cliffs of Pedn-men-du

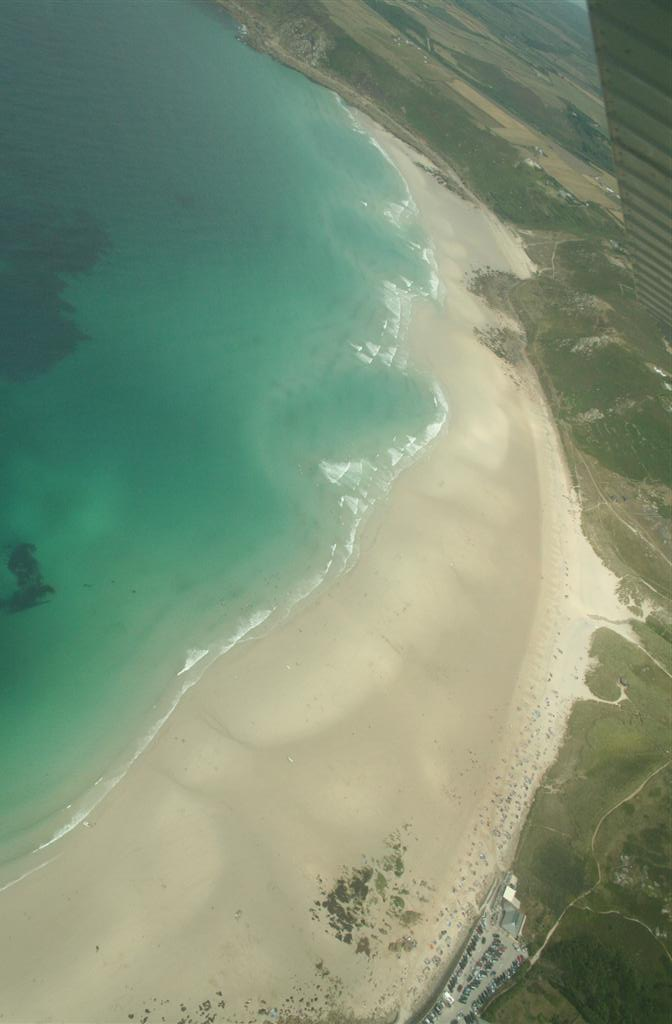
Aerial of Sennen Beach

Sennen Cove (Cornish: Porthsenan) (grid reference SW352261) is a small coastal village in the parish of Sennen in Cornwall, England, United Kingdom. According to the Penwith District Council, the population of this settlement was estimated at 180 persons in 2000. The South West Coast Path passes through Sennen Cove.

== Geography ==
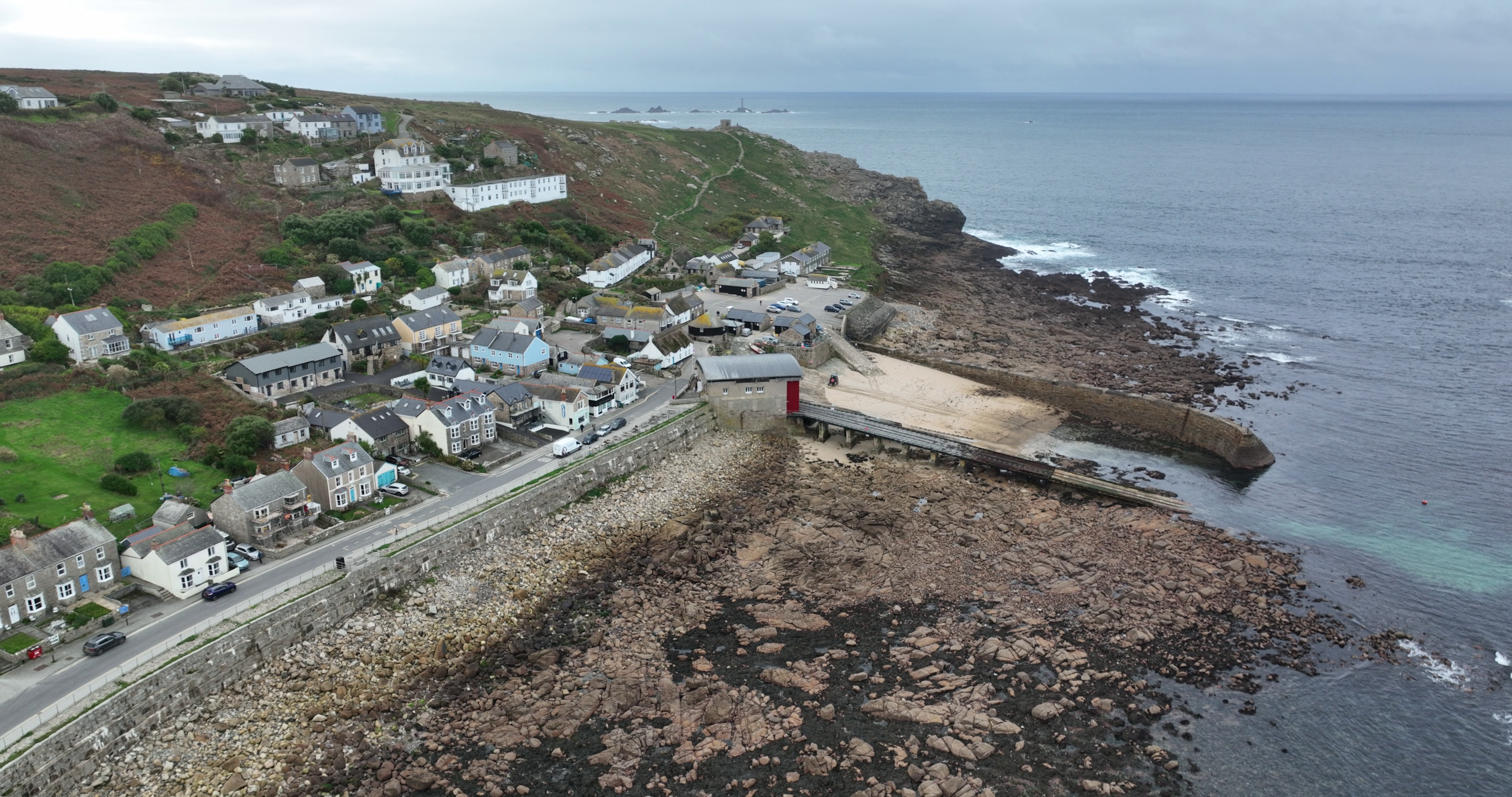
Aerial view of Sennen Harbour in Cornwall, UK.

The village of Sennen Cove overlooks the southern end of Whitesand Bay. There is not a cove in the usual geological sense. The village (as distinct from Sennen Churchtown), is on a spur road which joins the A30 trunk road about two miles (3 km) from Land's End. Thus it is the first village from Land's End along the north coast. The road descends gently for about 300 yards and then steeply for another 300 yards to the village which lies above the beach. The beach extends further north along Whitesand Bay. There are a few dozen houses built primarily of granite and some of concrete, arranged mainly in terraces, typical of many of the villages in Cornwall. Several submarine telecommunications cables reach land at Sennen Cove and are connected via landlines to the cable terminating equipment at Skewjack together with others from Porthcurno.

== Sea and seashore ==
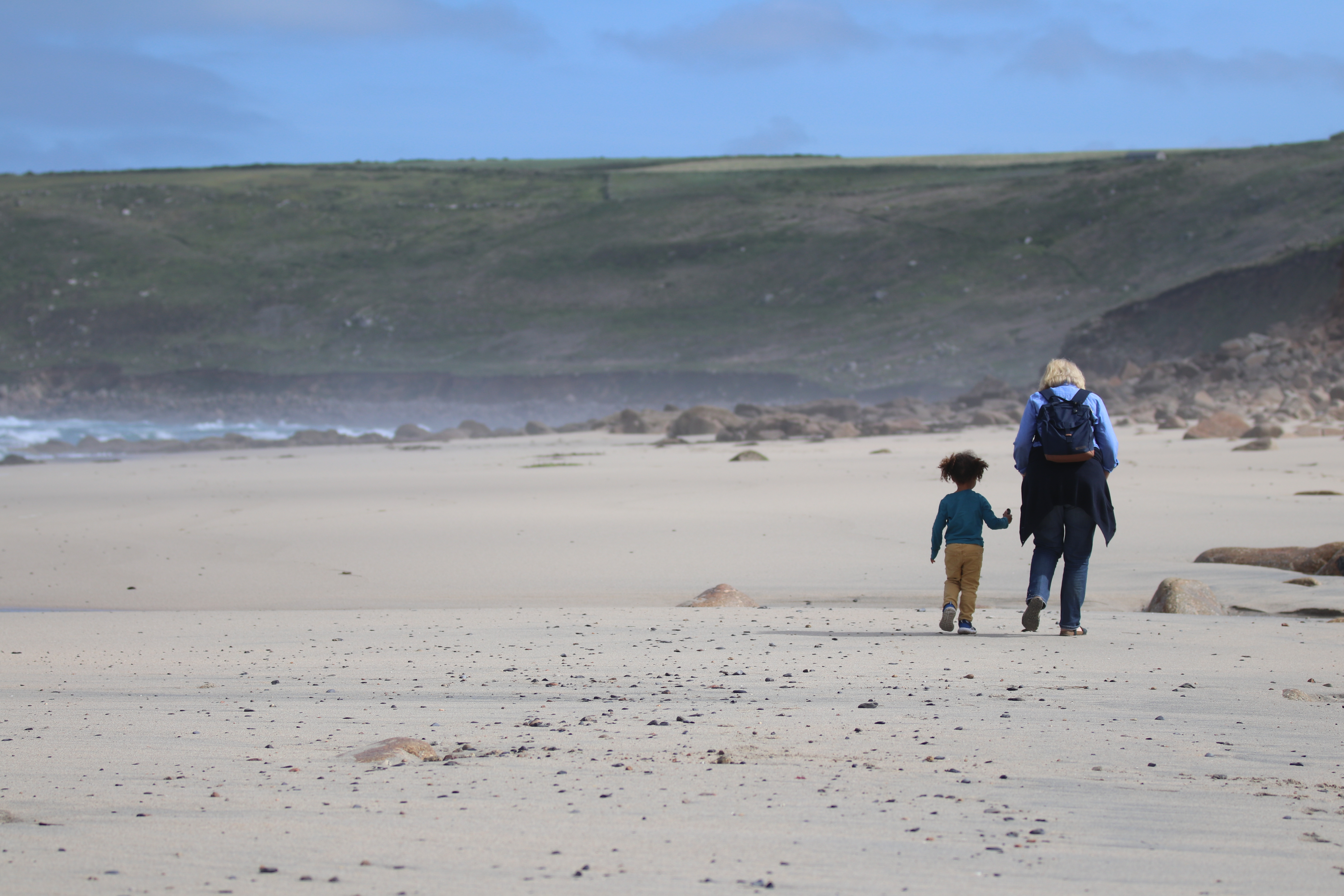
Walking along Sennen Beach in Cornwall

=== Lifeboat ===
Sennen Cove Lifeboat Station is a Royal National Lifeboat Institution base founded in 1853. It is run by volunteers and operates a Tamar-class all-weather lifeboat and an IB1 inshore lifeboat. They are crewed by a complement of 24 people who ensure that the boats are operational and on call 24 hours a day, throughout the year. Next to the lifeboat station is the restored Roundhouse, now used as an art gallery and souvenir shop, but originally used to house a winch for hauling boats up from the beach.

=== Surfing ===
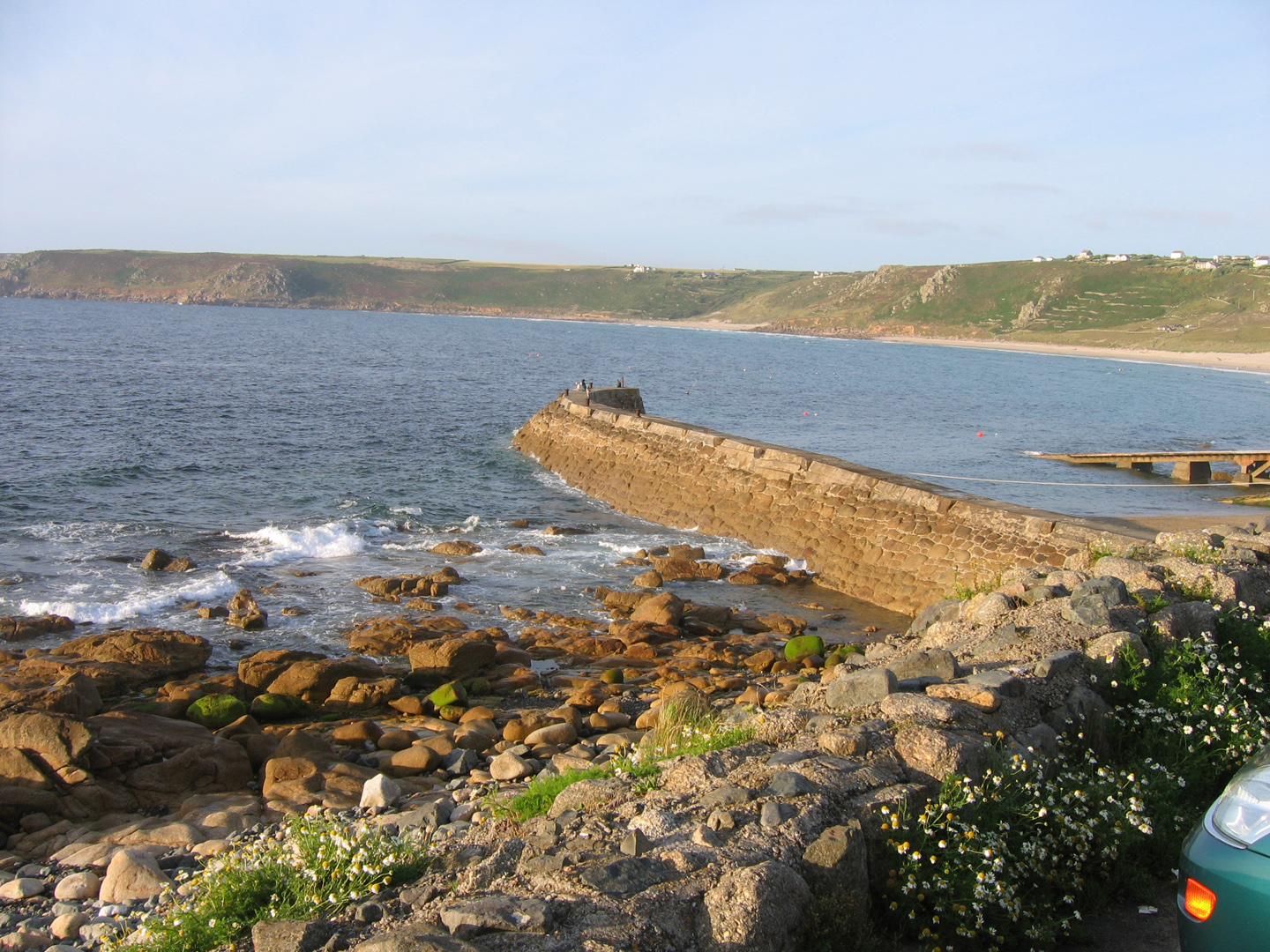
Sennen Cove breakwater

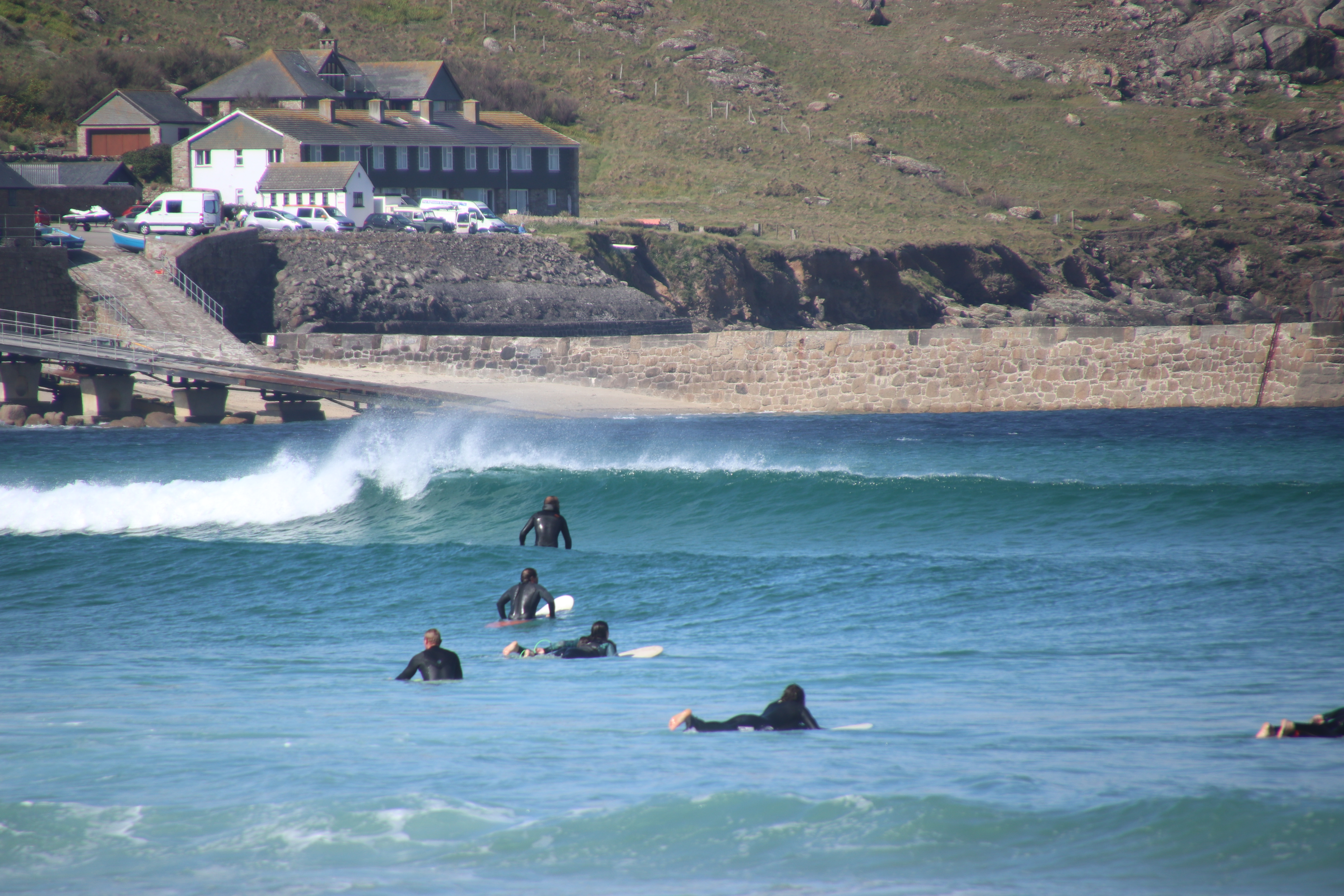
Surfers in the sea at Sennen Cove, Cornwall

Sennen Cove has become renowned for its surfing conditions and is highly regarded by local and non-local surfers alike. Sennen tends to be slightly more protected from winds and swell than Gwenver at the other end of Whitesand Bay. Sennen is good at most tides, except extreme high tide, but works best with a westerly swell and a light easterly wind. Surf gear can be hired at the beach, next to a car park and beach café.

=== Bilbo the canine lifeguard ===
The beach was home to Bilbo, the first ever UK canine lifeguard. The Newfoundland first started working on the beach in 2005, but the dog was suspended from service on the beach when the lifeguards were taken over by the RNLI in early 2008 (see below), because Bilbo was not being allowed to walk on the sand (the beach is strictly dog free in the summer), and the new RNLI regulation that restricts the carrying of more than one person (or dog) on the beach's quad bike. During the three years he was in service (2005–2007), he raised many tourists' awareness of the dangers of swimming outside the designated zones controlled by the lifeguards, led by the 'Bilbo Says' campaign. Since the restriction of just 4 hours a week in 2008, there has been a public cry for Bilbo's reinstatement. A number of petitions have been posted online, and a paper petition has been created inside the Old Success Inn, Sennen Cove.

Bilbo died in May 2015, and his death was noted in many national newspapers and news sources.

In 2005, the popular children's book Shanti The Wandering Dog of Sennen & The Land's End was published, and tells the story of a collie dog who goes off on his lone wanderings around Sennen Cove, whilst his owner, an old man who spends his day looking out to sea from his hill-top house window, snoozes. The old man never knows that Shanti goes off alone around the cove.

Alfie The MerCat of Sennen Cove is an illustrated story book by one of Cornwall's youngest published authors, Charlie Rose Elliott Peake. The story has a subtle sea-safety message and is about a ginger feral kitten named Alfie whose life is literally transformed by some mermaids who live in the bay.

== Economy ==
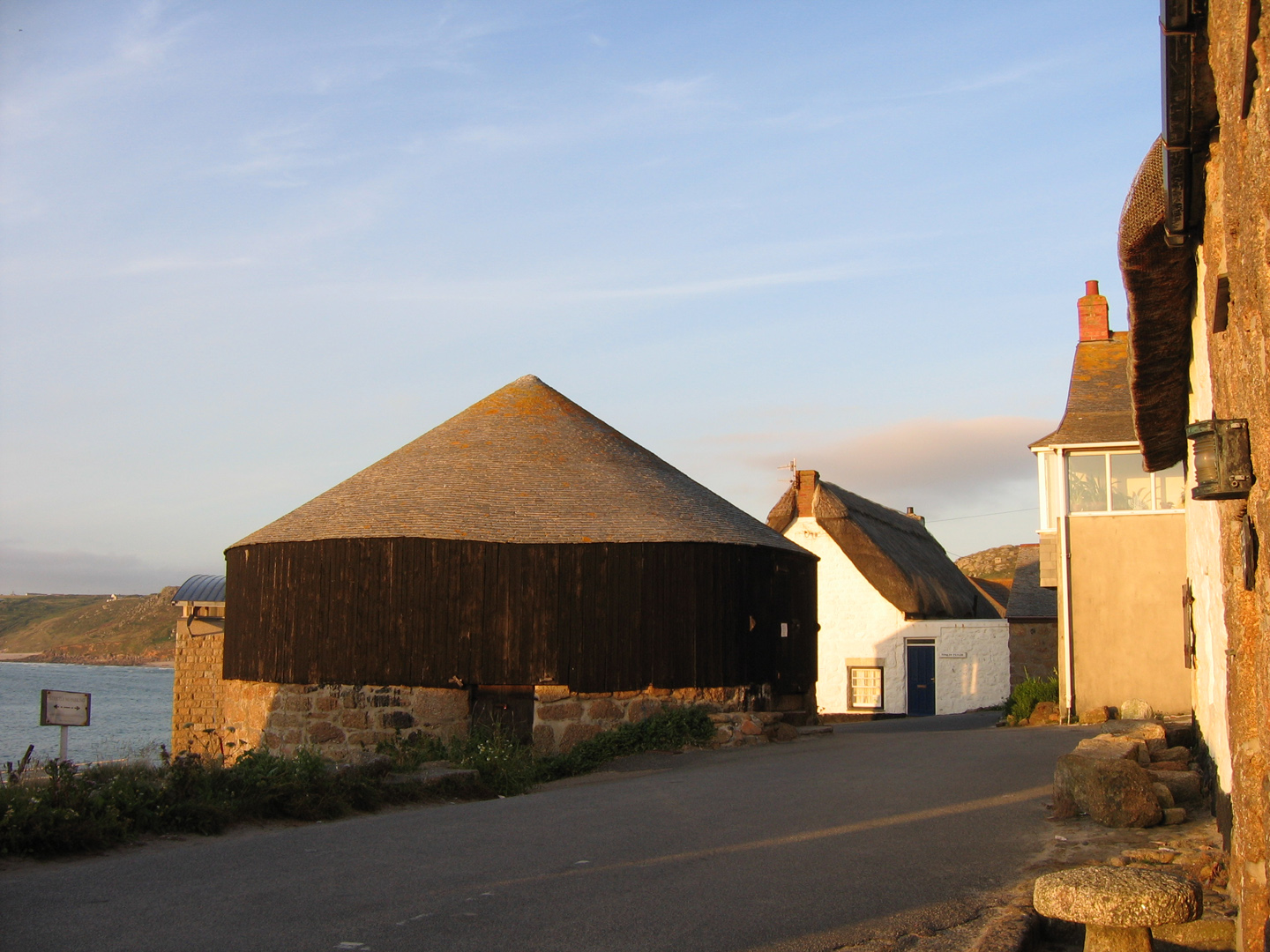
Sennen Cove, the Round House

The village is heavily dependent on tourism and is particularly popular with sea surfing enthusiasts. The main tourist season runs from spring until autumn, peaking in the school holidays in August. "The Old Boathouse", a surf shop called "Chapel Idne", and a public house are located here as well as various small cafes, ice cream stands, souvenir shops, and small private art galleries, most of which are only open during the tourist season. The South West Coast Path passes through Sennen Cove, being about half an hour's walk from Land's End.

On 8 June 1881 the Faraday landed the eastern end of the trans-atlantic cable known as the "Direct American line". A temporary hut was erected about 30 yards (27 m) west of the Cowloe Rocks. immediately below the "hevva" station (seine fishery) and close to the road leading out of the cove. The western end of the cable was at Sable Island, off Canada.

A small fishing fleet of seven is protected by a breakwater built in 1908. Mullet used to be an important catch in the bay with the fishery beginning at the end of January and continued towards the end of April. Sennen Cove was the most important seine fishery in Cornwall and, in Edwardian times, large schools were still entering the bay with as many as 12,000 caught at one time. Seining continued into the 20th century with 1200 stone caught on 3 March 1977.

The area of cliffs known as "Pedn men du" in the cove is also popular with rock climbers, having non-tidal access.

== Transport ==
First South West runs bus services to Sennen Cove. Service A1 calls at Sennen Cove on the journey between Penzance and Lands End roughly every hour during the daytime. In summer, open top bus A3 calls into the cove on the trip between St Ives and Lands End. Until their demise in 2006, Sennen Cove was a popular destination with enthusiasts of the Bristol VR bus due to the steep incline leaving the cove.

== Music ==
Shoegaze indie-rock band from the UK, Ride titled a track in their 1990 album Nowhere after Sennen Cove, named 'Sennen'. 1920s-30s composer and pianist Billy Mayerl composed a tone-poem titled "Sennen Cove" after Sennen Cove.

== Art ==
The horizon at Sennen serves as the inspiration for a collection of 365 paintings entitled "Sennen: A Moment in Time" by renowned abstract artist Tony Davie.

== Folklore Traditions ==
In the nineteenth and early twentieth century a number of folklorists found folklore stories and beliefs at Sennen Cove. Walter Evans-Wentz collected fairy stories from a local, John Gilbert Guy with references to changeling beliefs, fairies dancing and fairy water. Robert Hunt recorded a mermaid tradition from the Cove. William Bottrell included a section about a supernatural being named the Hooper: a marine creature that appeared as light in the mist just off the Cove and 'hooped' to keep the fishermen off the sea when storms were coming. There was also a dramatic supernatural encounter in 1888 when two local girls, Grace and Minnie James, reported seeing three fairies or pixies dancing in a circle at a well above the settlement.

== Gallery ==
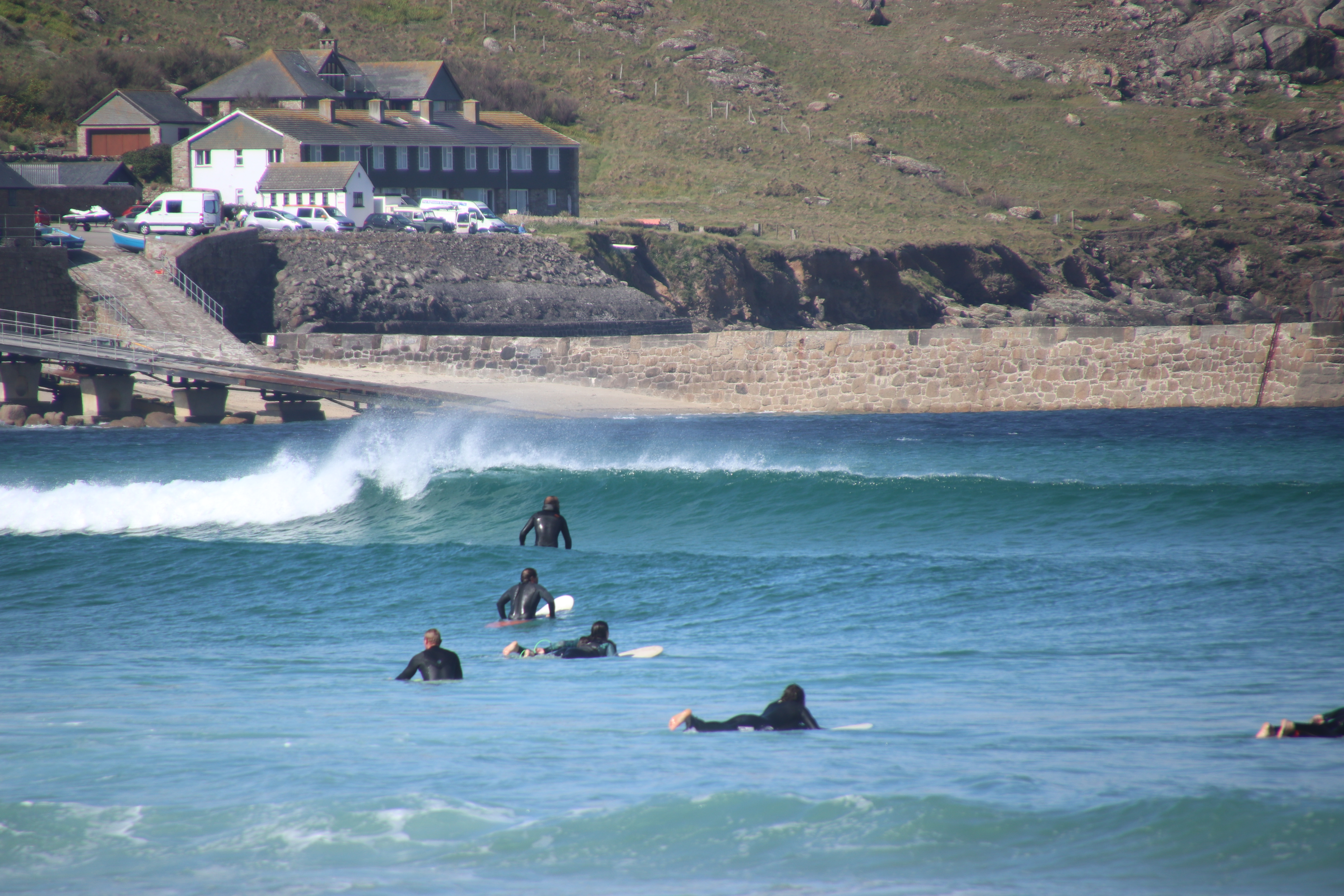
Surfers in sea at Sennen

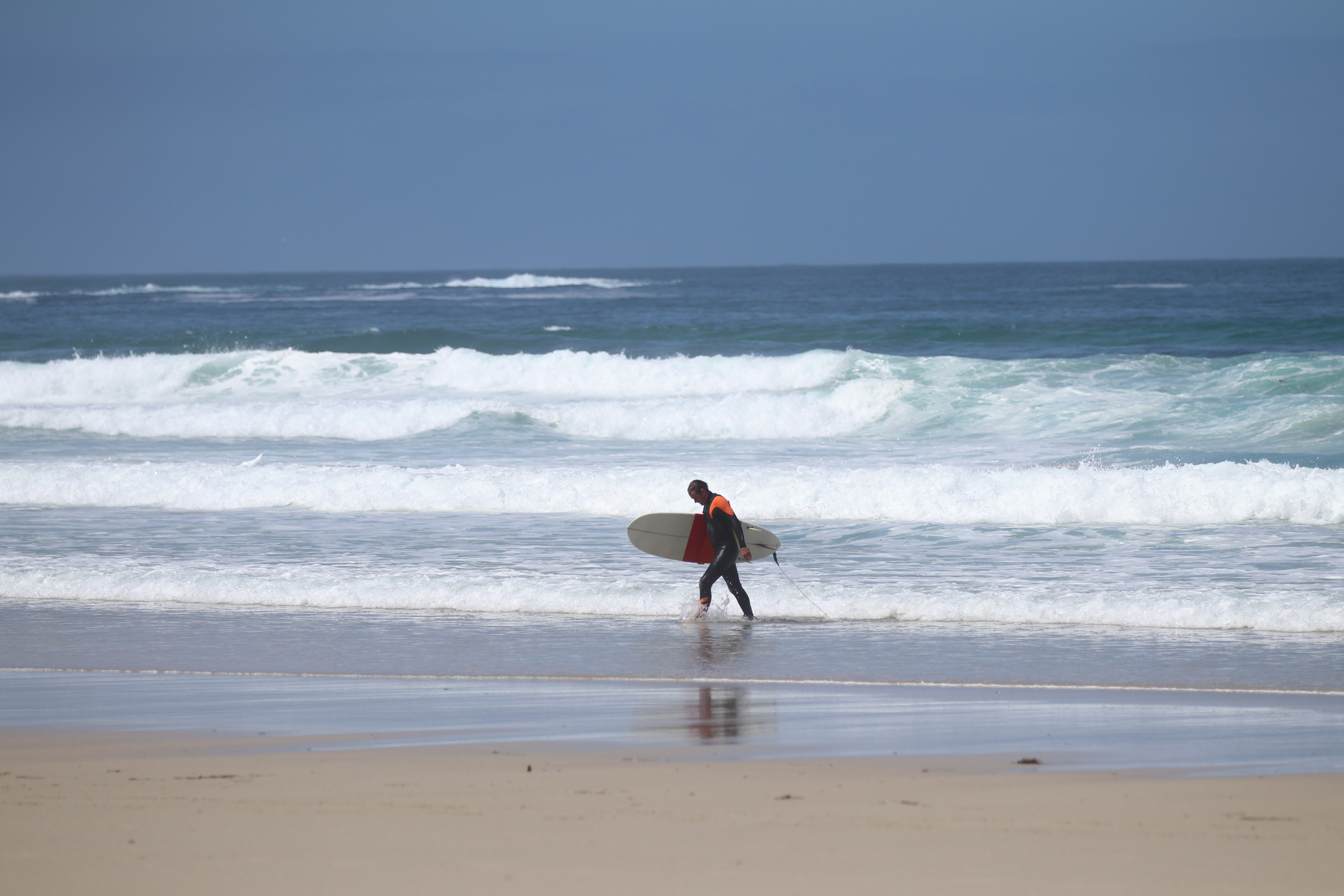
Surfer Coming from Sea Sennen Cornwall

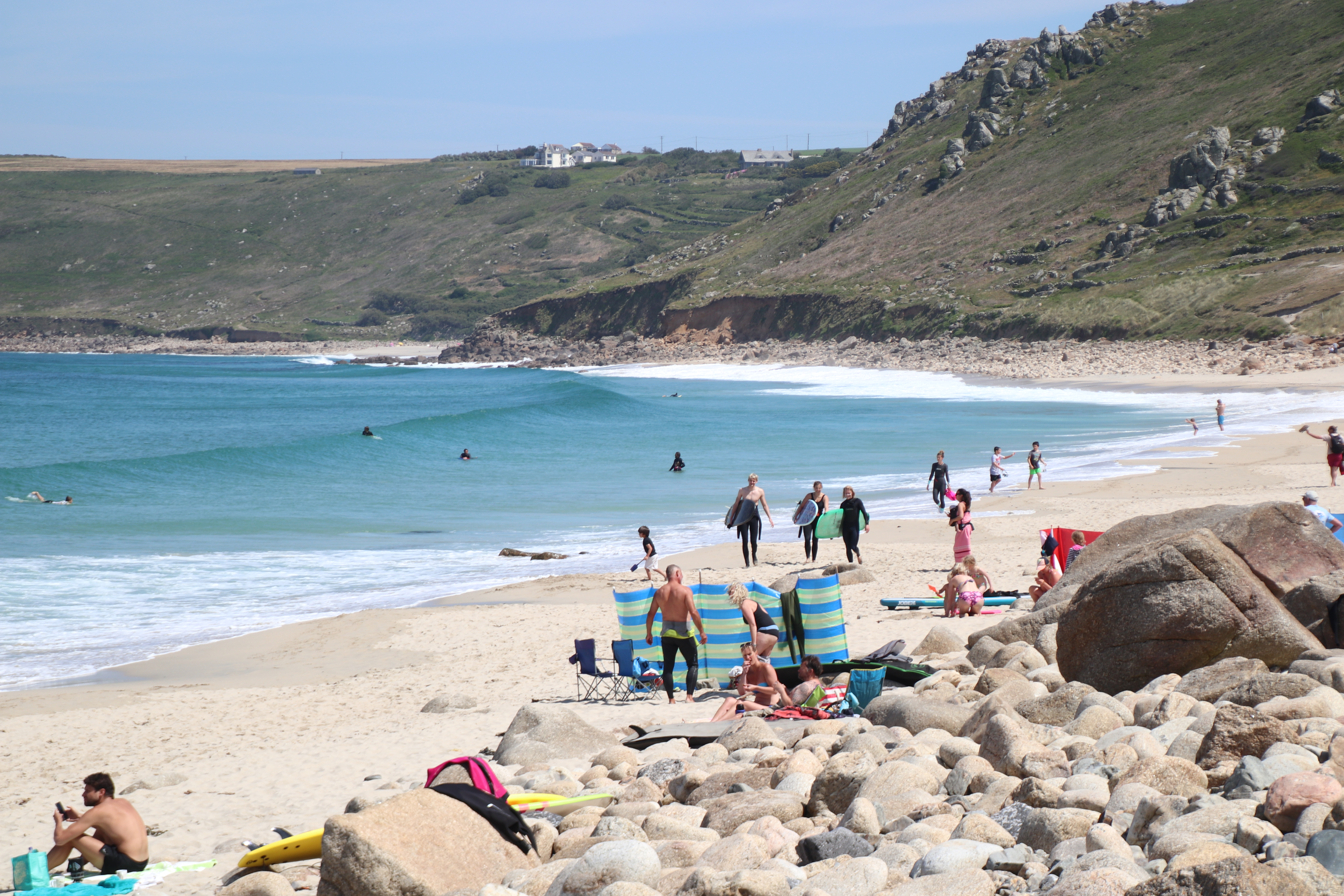
People enjoying at Sennen Cove Beach

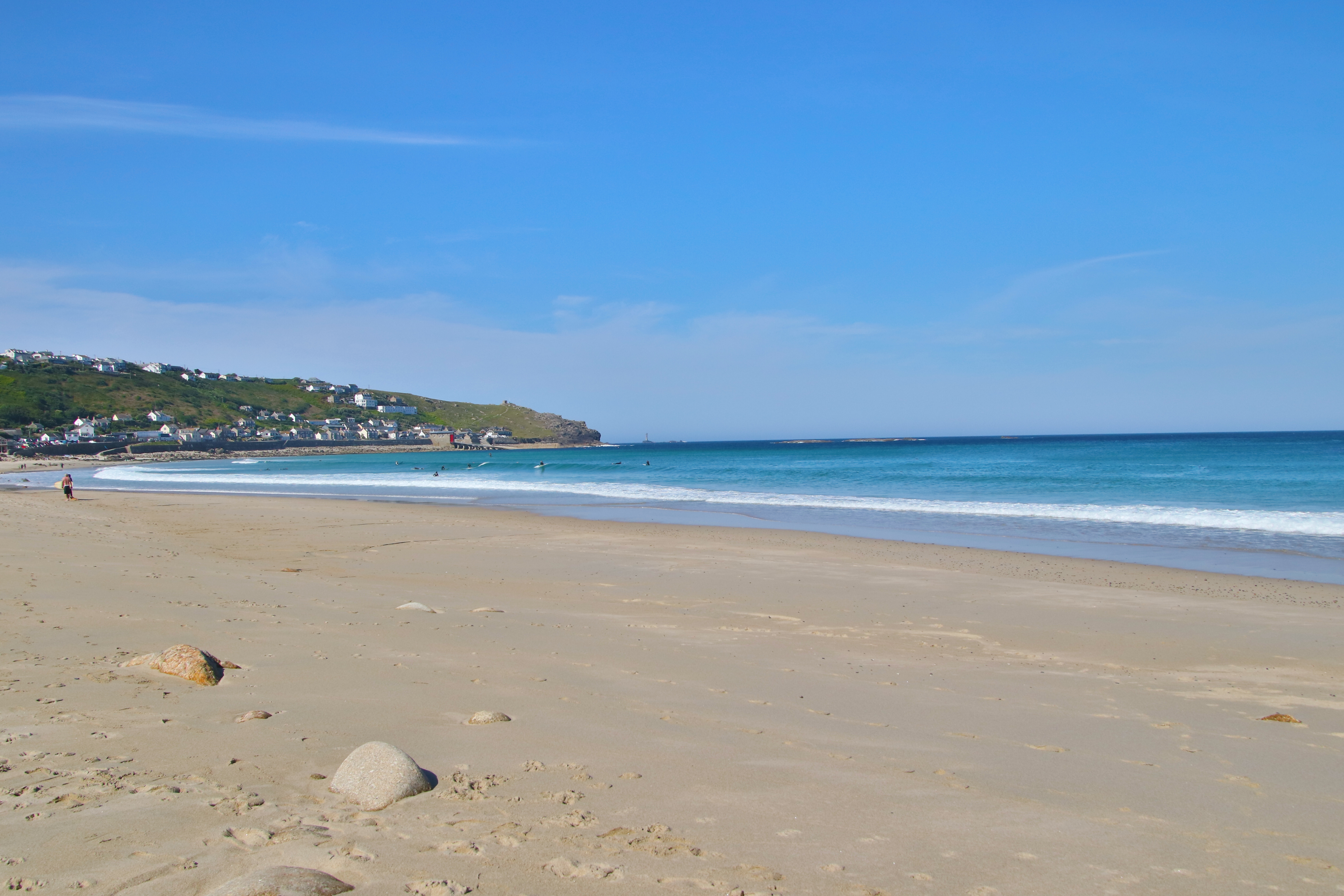
The far end of Sennen Cove Beach

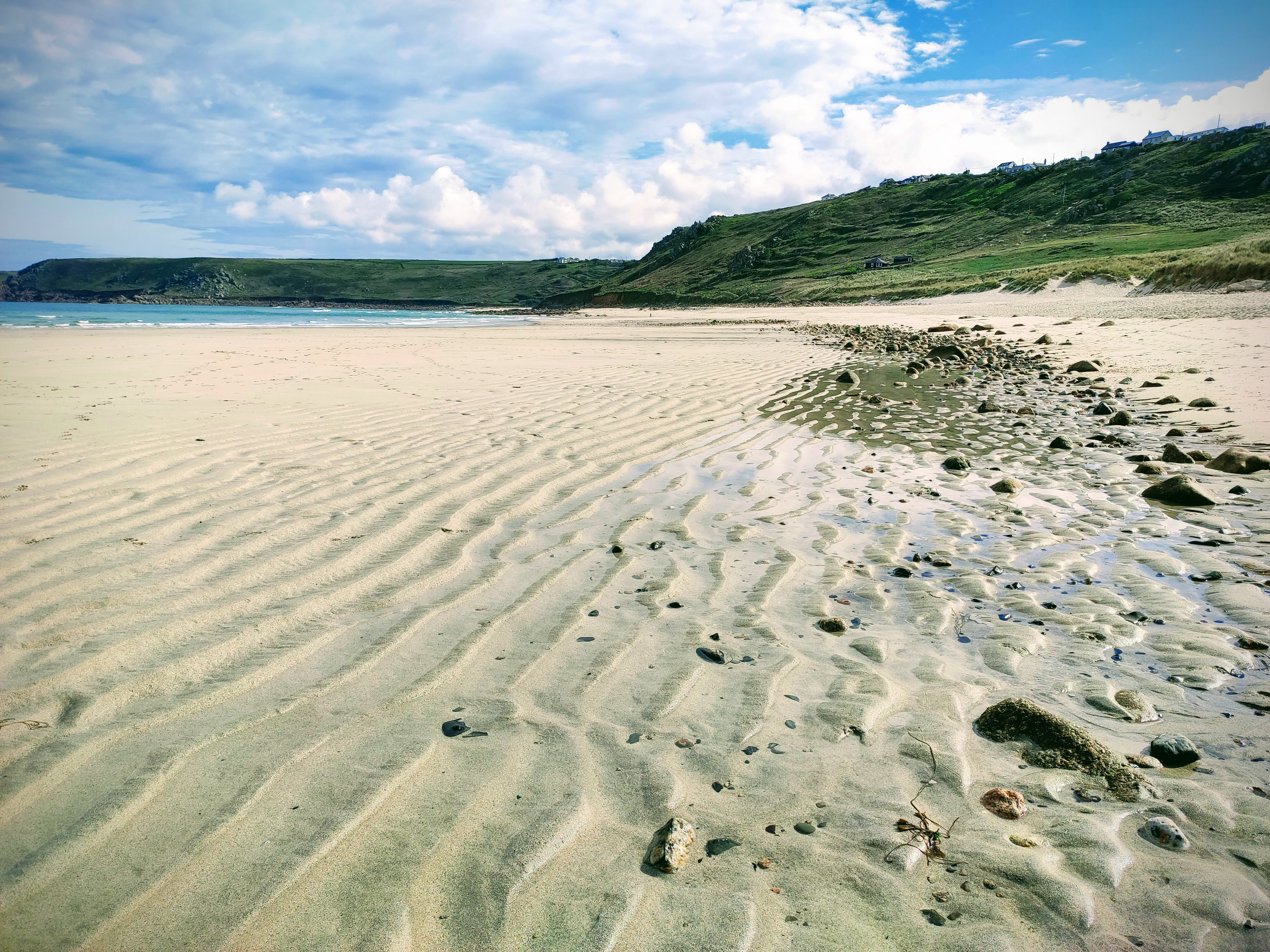
Sand at Sennen Cove Beach

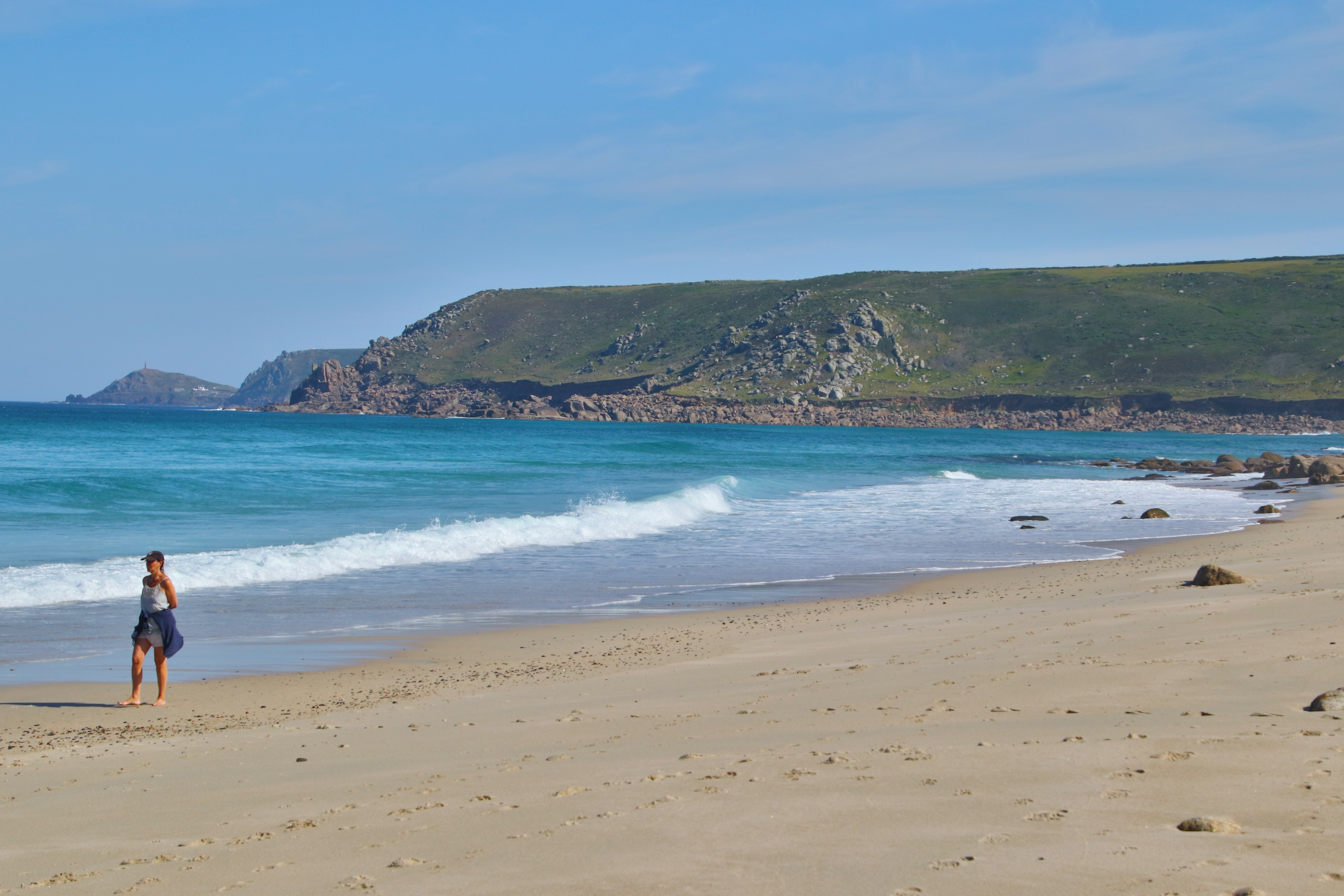
Sennen Cove Beach

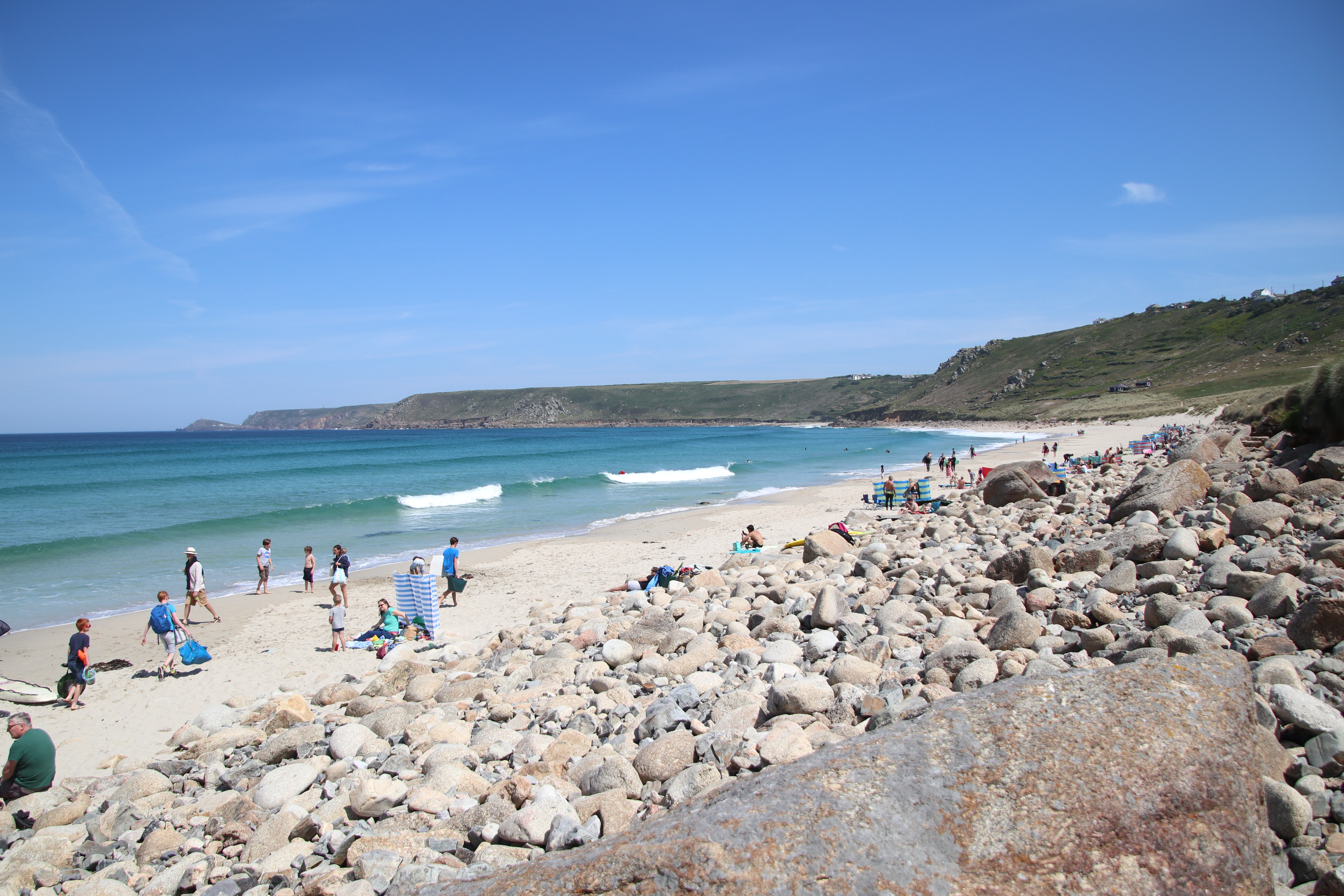
Waves at Sennen Cove Beach

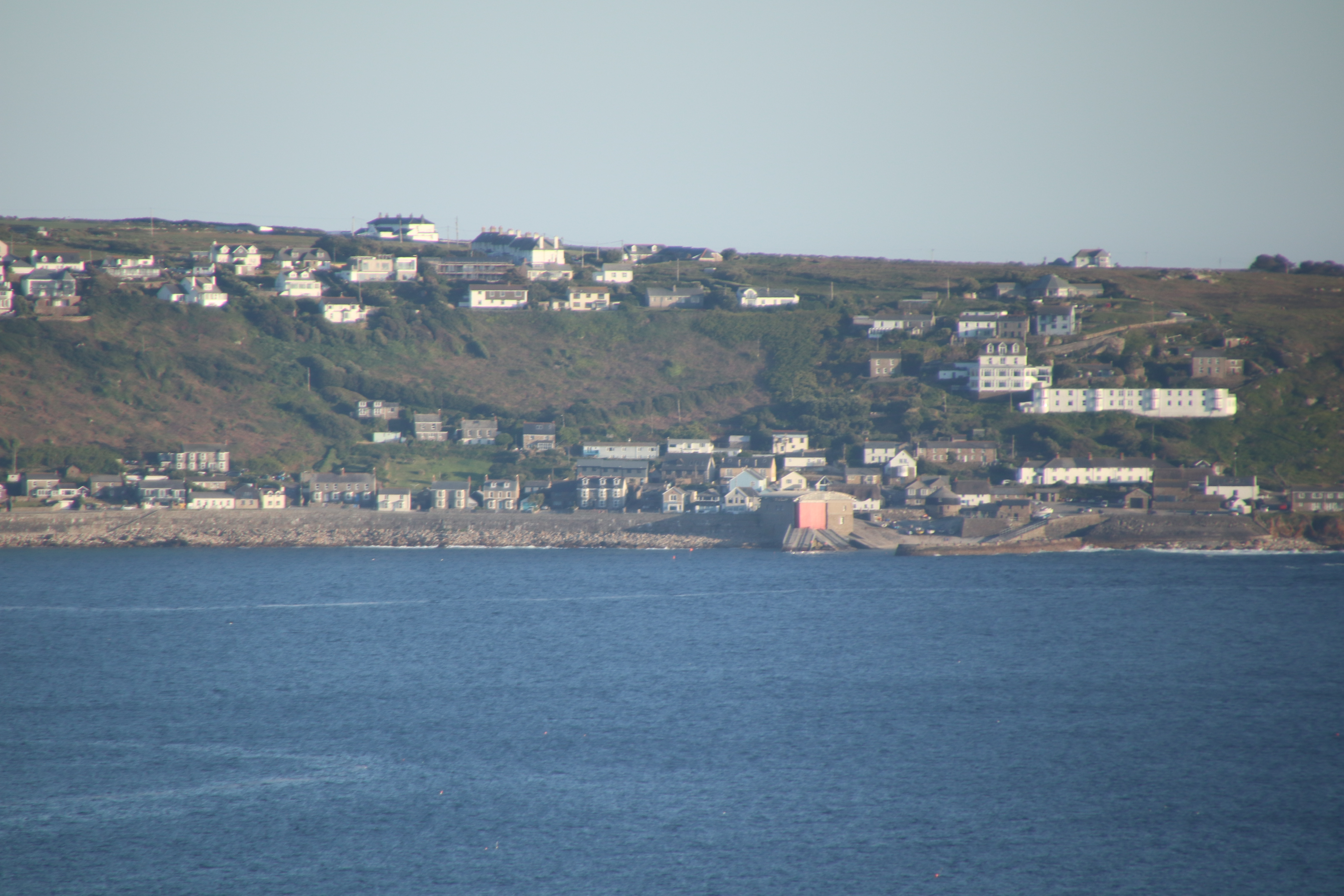
Beautiful Scene at Sennen Cove Beach

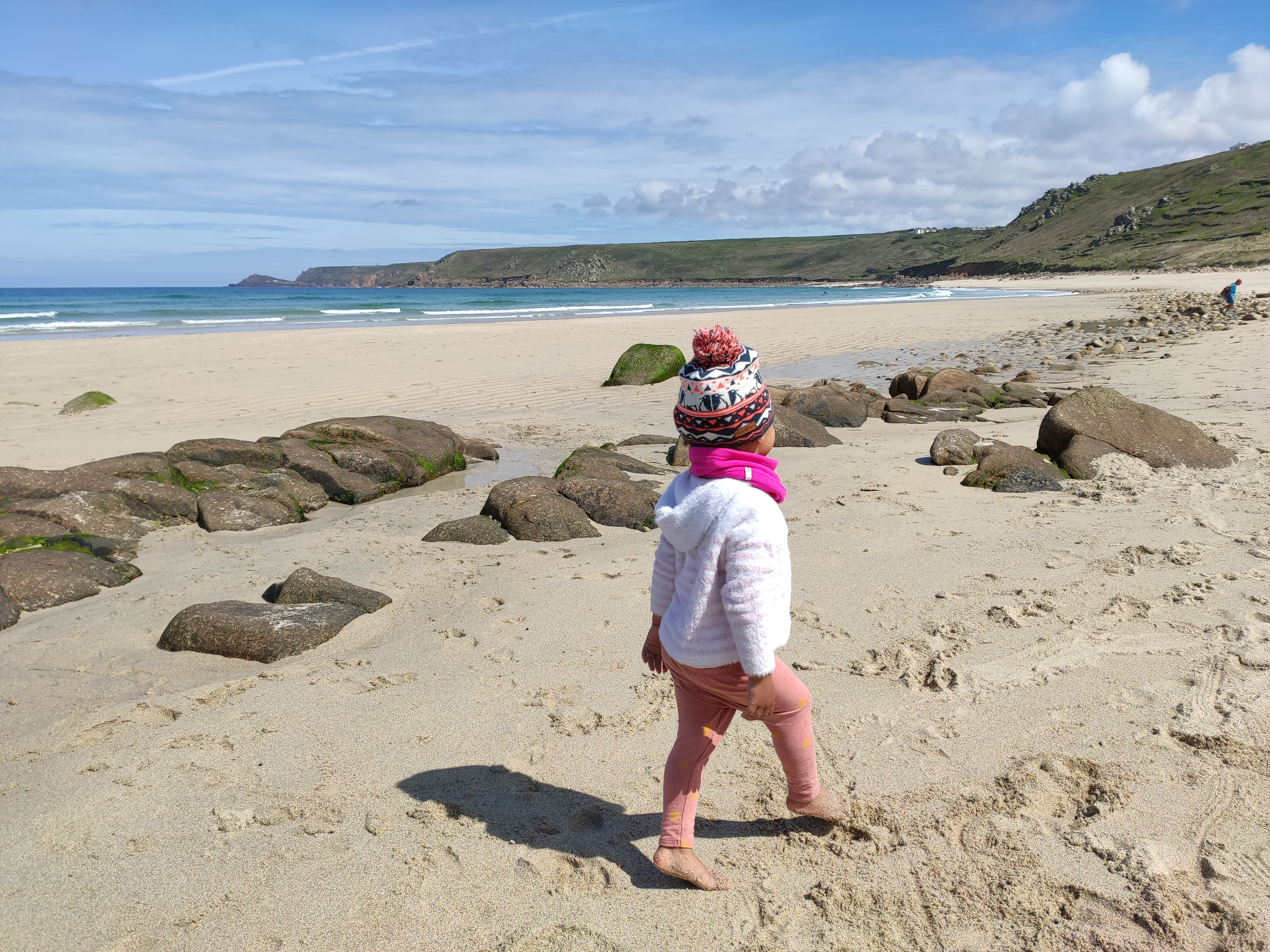
Toddler at Sennen Cove Beach

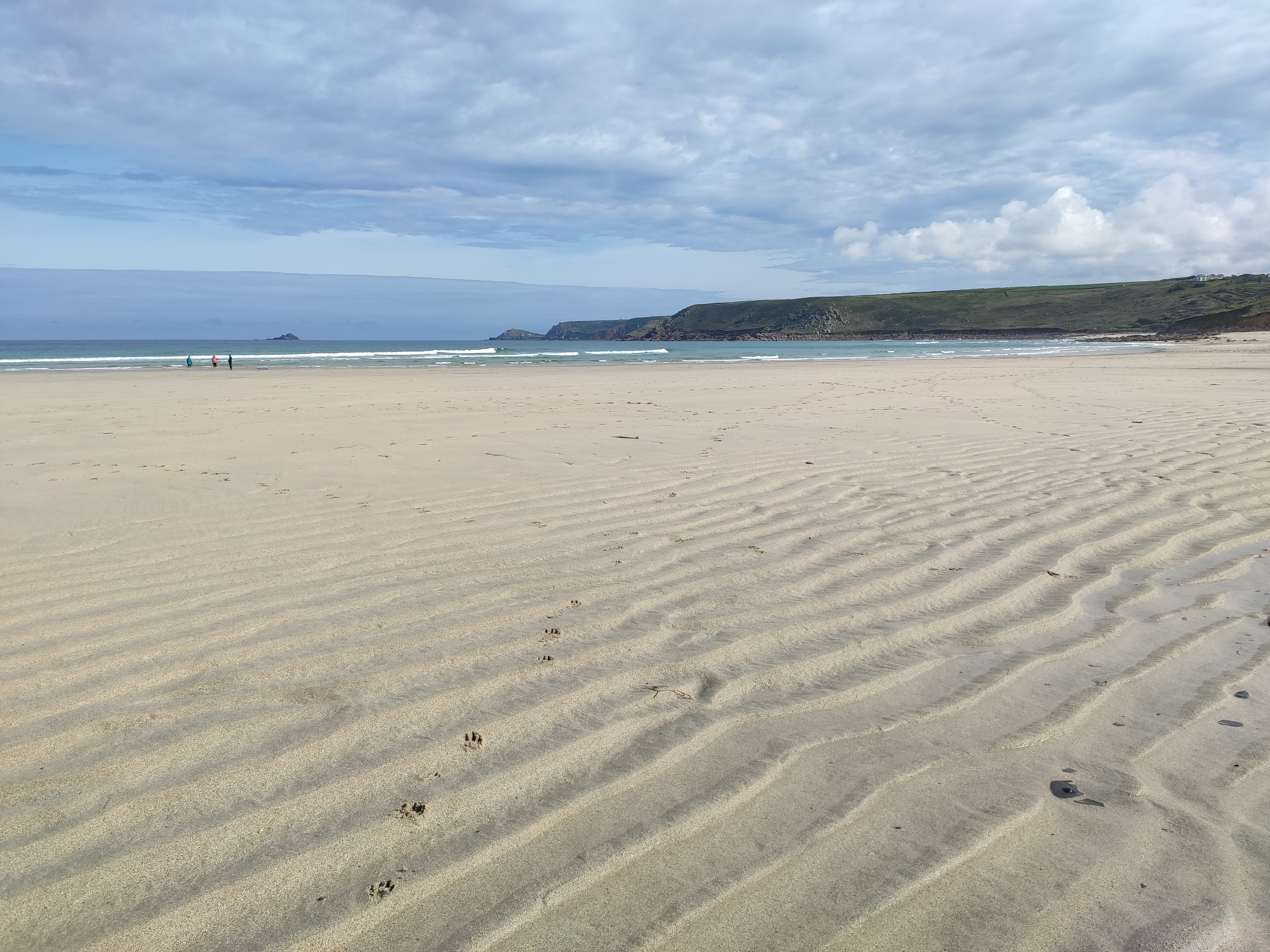
Sennen Cove Beach

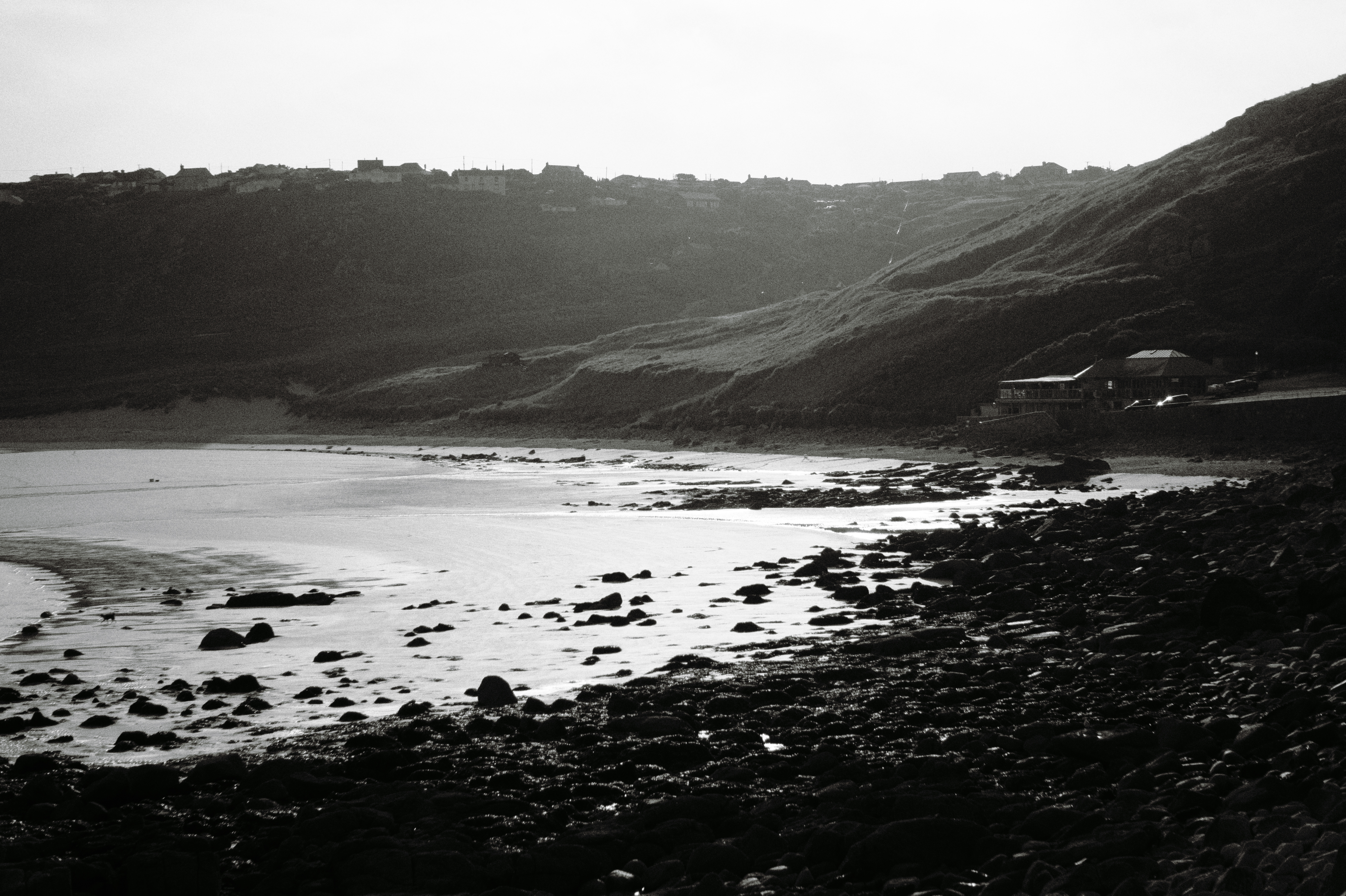
Sennen cove in monochrome
