= HMS Eclair =

Five ships of the Royal Navy have been named HMS Eclair:

- The first Eclair was a French "barque latine", launched on 5 July 1771, re-classed as a corvette in 1783. Between 22 June and 24 September 1792 she sailed to Malta, Tunis, and the Îles d'Hyères while under the command of lieutenant de vaisseau Basterot de La Barrière. She was under the command of lieutenant de vaisseau Roubaud when HMS Leda and HMS Illustrious captured her on 16 June 1793, south of Marseilles. The Royal Navy took her into service as a 22-gun post-ship. She became a powder hulk in April 1797 and was sold in 1806.
- The second Eclair was a 3-gun gunvessel captured from the French in 1795. She was converted to a schooner before sailing to the West Indies in 1796. She was renamed Safety in 1802 and hulked. Safety was listed as a guardship in the West Indies in 1808 and as prison ship in 1810. She then reappeared as a receiving hulk at Tortola in 1841. She was finally broken up in 1879.
- The third HMS Eclair (1801) was a 10-gun schooner. Under the command of enseigne de vaiseau Sougé she sailed to Basse-Terre. Garland, a tender to Daphne, captured her in the anchorage at Grande-Anse, les Saintes in 1801. Eclair was renamed Pickle in 1809 and sold in 1818.
- The fourth HMS Eclair (1807) was an 18-gun Cruizer-class brig-sloop launched in 1807 and broken up in 1831.
- The fifth Eclair, was originally the 6-gun sloop HMS Infernal. Infernal was renamed Eclair in 1844 but then renamed Rosamund in 1846; Rosamund became a floating factory in 1863 and was finally broken up in 1865.
