= Nuestra Señora de Encarnación =

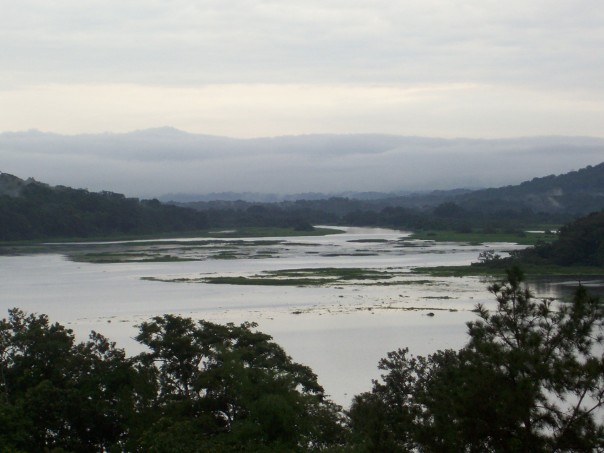
- The Chagres River, where Encarnación sank

History

Spanish Empire
- Name: Nuestra Señora de Encarnación
- Launched: Veracruz, New Spain
- In service: ?–1681
- Out of service: 29 November – 3 December 1681
- Stricken: 1681
- Home port: Cartagena
- Fate: Wrecked between 29 November to 3 December 1681 at the mouth of the Chagres River

General characteristics
- Type: Nao carrack
- Length: ~30 meters
- Beam: ~10 meters

Encarnación (officially named Nuestra Señora de Encarnación), was an armed Spanish merchant ship of the Nao class, which was built in Veracruz, Viceroyalty of New Spain, likely sometime in the mid-1600s. The ship sank in a storm in 1681 at the mouth of the Chagres River and was discovered by archaeologists from the Texas State University in 2011.

== Commission and construction ==
The name Nuestra Señora de Encarnación translates into English directly as Our Lady of the Incarnation, a religious reference to the birth of the Messiah, God becoming man in the flesh. The names of contemporary Spanish ships commonly had religious undertones as with general Spanish naming traditions of the period.

Encarnación was likely commissioned sometime in the mid-1600s though the exact date is unknown. She was built in Veracruz, New Spain and at some point attached to the Flota de Indias which she was attached to in 1681.

== Service ==
Nuestra Señora de Encarnación was assigned to the Flota de Las Indias: Tierra Firme sailing out of Cartagena, which was one of two fleets of the Spanish American colonies and charged with the transport of resources, troops and trade goods between the Spanish Crown possessions of the Caribbean and Northern Latin American colonies and cross Atlantic journeys to the Spanish port of Cádiz. The Flota de Tierra Firme was charged with the lucrative trade in Peruvian silver as well as other goods from Northern South America. The ships sailed from Cartagena to Havana then on to Cádiz. The other main fleet of the Flota de Las Indias was the Flota de Nueva Espana, charged with the Mexican and Spanish Main trade amongst other things.

== The 1681–1682 Tierra Firme Fleet and sinking ==
The Flota de Tierra Firme left Cádiz on 28 January 1681 under the command of Juan Antonio Vicentelo de Leca y Herrara, the I Marqués de Brenes. Dominion over Brenes had been raised from a Señorio to a Marquisate in 1671 by order of King Carlos II of Spain in favor of Leca y Herrara. The fleet reached Cartagena on 2 April 1681 and stayed in port due to unfavorable weather conditions and the threat of piracy leading to the dispatch of convoys to scout the surrounding waters to ensure the fleet's safety. In around November, the Tierra Firme fleet left Cartagena bound for Portobelo.

On 29 November 1681, the Flota de Tierra Firme was caught in a storm near the mouth of the Chagres River in modern-day Panama. Due to the gale force winds brought by the storm, the fleet was forced to take measures for self-preservation considering the shallow water depth and were ordered to weigh anchor by the flagship Santo Cristo de San Agustín y Nuestra Señora del Rosario. Most ships of the fleet successfully weighed their anchor and managed to avoid further damage. On 29 November, Boticaria, which may have been a barge, or a Nao carrack, sank in a relatively peaceful manner with most of the crew and cargo saved after three days of taking on water and failing to contain a leak due to running itself onto a reef during the storm. Two crew were lost from Boticara which sank near the Isla de Naranjos.

Between 29 November and 3 December, most of the fleet had managed to maintain some kind of cohesion though weather conditions remained poor. Nuestra Señora de Encarnación sank sometime during this period at an area called Punta de Brujas (En: Witch's Point) at the mouth of the Chagres River, possibly after being separated from the rest of the fleet. It was at this time that three ships of the fleet were sunk as a result of the storm with Nuestra Señora de Encarnación sinking after being dashed against some rocks resulting in the deaths of the "owner" and much of the crew around 3 December after a few days in the storm. At least one other source mentions a very similar accident but attributes the sinking to a ship called Nuestra Señora de la Soledad which is referred to as a galleon and not a merchant carrack or nao. Nuestra Señora de la Soledad was captained by a Don Antonio de Lima who perished in the wreck by drowning. A ship that was probably the Soledad struck rocks or a reef in the area of Punta de Brujas and broke up on impact leading to the death of around 280 people, likely most of the galleon's crew, with its treasure completely lost in totality. What remains probable in any case is that both Nuestra Señora de la Soledad and Encarnación did, in fact, sink sometime between 29 November and 3 December 1681 as a result of the same storm and the hazardous nature of the area with its shallow water depth and various reefs. It is likely that Encarnación, despite sinking, was not damaged to the same extent as ships like Nuestra Señora de la Soledad given her present-day state of preservation.

As the fleet continued through the Chagres River area, most of the fleet reached Portobelo by 3 December. On 3 December, another ship, Chaperon became stranded on another reef in the area. Chaperon, also a Nao carrack, sank soon thereafter though most of its crew were saved and 11 were lost. A further ship, a small tartana, also sank in the course of efforts to lend assistance to the crew of Chaperon.

After a period of a few months to give time for repairs and refitting, the Flota de Tierra Firme left Portobelo for Cartagena on 27 March 1682. On 7 May 1682, the fleet sailed for Havana in preparation for the trans-Atlantic journey to Cádiz. Whilst en route to Havana, another Nao carrack, Santa Teresa, under Don Manuel de Galarza, sank and some of the fleet returned to Cartagena for repairs. The galleon Nuestra Señora de la Concepción y San Ignacio de Loyola was lost on the approach to Havana at Cape San Antonio though its cargo was salvaged prior to its sinking. The fleet reached Havana around 1 June and soon thereafter sailed for Cádiz to complete the fleet's 1681-82 action arriving on 2 September 1682.

== 2011 discovery ==
The wreck is remarkable due to the complete nature of the ship which lies at a depth of 32 feet (9.8 m) to 40 feet (12 m) below sea level. The wreck appears to have been fully laden with goods and appears to be very much intact not having been plundered or disturbed by natural elements. The cargo discovered on the ship includes around 100 wooden boxes containing metal swords, nails, bolts of cloth, horseshoes and scissors and a sizable quantity of ceramic pottery. The ship was also found to have a coating of gravel for use as a permanent ballast instead of the ballast stones that have been found in other wrecks of Spanish ships.

The intended target of the archaeological team that discovered the wreck was the treasure fleet of Captain Henry Morgan which lost five ships in the same waters around the mouth of the Chagres River in a storm in 1670.

It is unclear if this ship is the same ship that participated in the Battle of La Naval de Manila in 1646.
