= Maria Franklin =

Historical Archaeologist

- Occupation: Archaeologist

Academic background
- Education: University of California, Berkeley

Academic work
- Institutions: University of Texas, Austin

Maria Franklin is a professor of anthropology at the University of Texas at Austin. She is a historical archaeologist whose work includes Black-Feminist theory, African Diaspora studies, and race and gender.

== Education ==
She received her PhD in 1997 from the University of California, Berkeley.

== Career ==
Franklin is a professor at the University of Texas at Austin, where she currently serves as the chair of the Department of Anthropology and shares joint appointments with the Department of African and African Diaspora studies as well as the Center for African and African-American Studies. Her research includes work on plantation-related sites in the Chesapeake at Colonial Williamsburg, and the study of foodways in African American households in Texas.

From 2010-2013, she served on the board of directors of the Society for Historical Archaeology.

She is a member of the editorial board for American Antiquity.

== Selected Publications ==
Franklin, M. 1997. “Power to the people”: sociopolitics and the archaeology of black Americans. Historical Archaeology 31(3), 36-50.

Franklin, M. 2001. A Black feminist-inspired archaeology? Journal of Social Archaeology 1(1), 108-125.

Franklin, M. and McKee, L. 2004. African Diaspora Archaeologies: Present Insights and Expanding Discourses. Historical Archaeology 38(1):1-9.

Franklin, M. 2004 An Archaeological Study of the Rich Neck Slave Quarter and Enslaved Domestic Life. Colonial Williamsburg Research Publications. Dietz Press, Richmond, VA.

Franklin, M., & Lee, N. 2019. Revitalizing Tradition and Instigating Change: Foodways at the Ransom and Sarah Williams Farmstead, c. 1871–1905. Journal of African Diaspora Archaeology and Heritage 8(3), 202-225.

Franklin, M. 2020. Enslaved Household Variability and Plantation Life and Labor in Colonial Virginia. International Journal of Historical Archaeology 24(1), 115-155.

Franklin, M., & Lee, N. 2020. African American descendants, community outreach, and the Ransom and Sarah Williams Farmstead Project. Journal of Community Archaeology & Heritage 7(2), 135-148.
