= Community Capacity Development Office =

The Community Capacity Development Office (CCDO) was an office of the United States Department of Justice and a component of the Office of Justice Programs. The mission was to work within local communities to reduce crime and improve the quality of life.

The office oversaw and funded the Weed and Seed program which was established in 1991, which works to reduce drug abuse, violent crime and gang activity in high-risk neighborhoods. The 'Weed' aspect of the program is to remove all the negative influences in communities. The 'Seed' portion of the program is to bring in new influences that help promote a better quality of life through rehabilitation programs. The Weed and Seed program is no longer funded by Federal tax dollars, but its model is used in different community based programs. There are over 300 Weed and Seed locations across the country.

The CCDO was headed in the early 2000s by Dennis E. Greenhouse, formerly County Executive of New Castle County, Delaware.

The International Economic Development Council (IEDC) is an officially designated Weed and Seed technical assistance provider in areas of economic development and neighborhood restoration. Through a grant from the Department of Justice, IEDC helps Weed & Seed communities initiate efforts to bring in new investment and economic opportunities to their neighborhoods. IEDC's assistance is at no cost to the community.

For a sample of The Weed and Seed Strategy program, please see:

https://www.ncjrs.gov/pdffiles1/207498.pdf

Due to lack of federal funding, the Community Capacity Development Office closed June 5, 2011. However, as of 2025, some communities continue to have the Weed and Seed program, by funding it with other resources.

== See also ==
- Community policing
- Indianapolis Weed and Seed
- Regional Cities Initiative
- Tautophrase
- Victimology
