= Long's Bakery =

Bakery in Marion County, Indiana, US

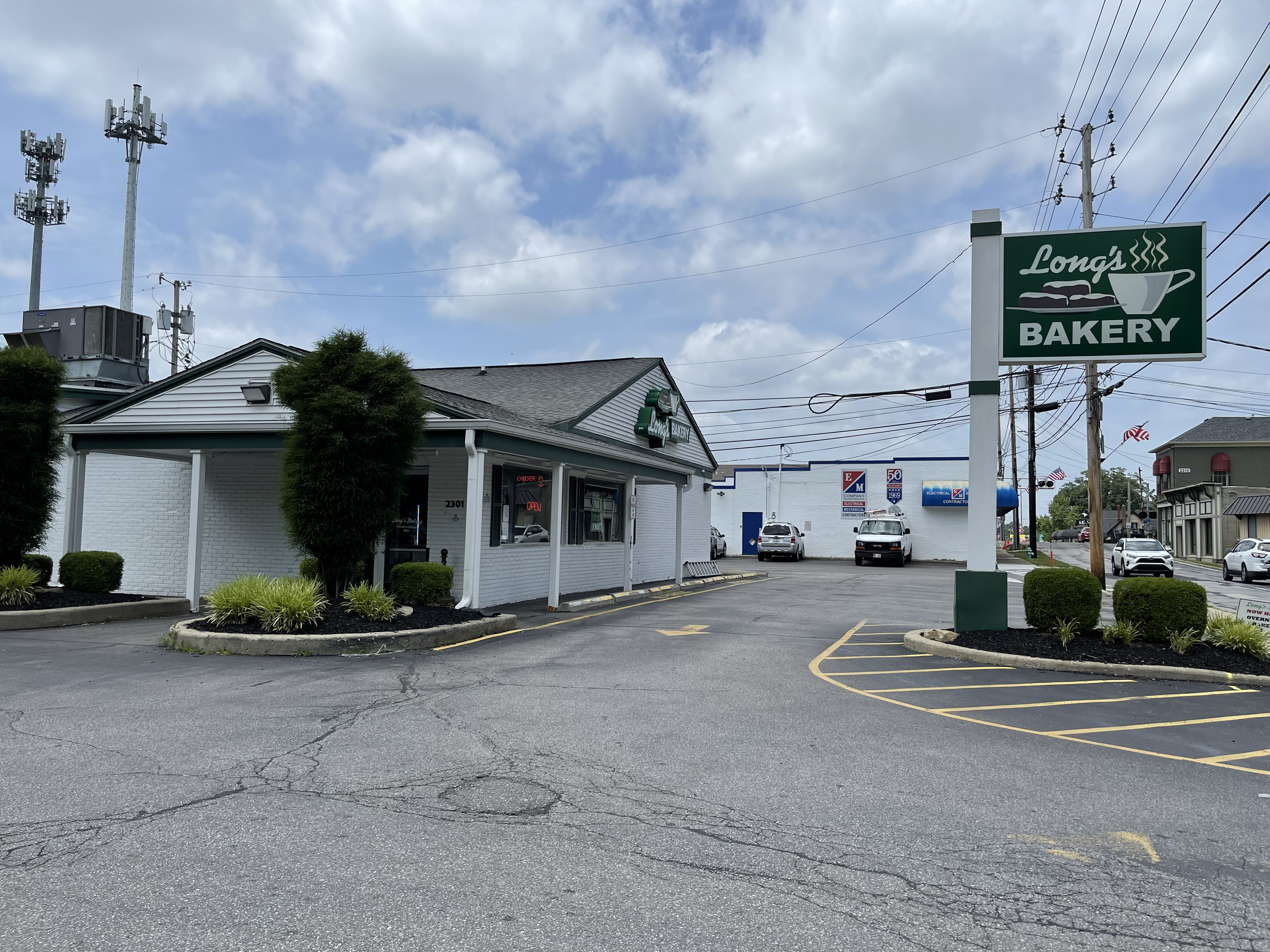
- Long's Bakery second location in Southport, Indiana, in 2022
- Interactive map of Long's Bakery

Restaurant information
- Established: 1951
- Food type: American
- Location: 1453 N Tremont St, Indianapolis, Indiana, 46222, U.S.
- Coordinates: 39.7876°N 86.2007°W
- Other locations: Southport, Indiana
- Other information: Cash only

Long's Bakery is a bakery specializing in donuts in the Haughville neighborhood of Indianapolis, Indiana, United States, with a second location in Southport, Indiana.

== History ==
Long's was founded in 1951 in Haughville. A second location in Southport, just south of Indianapolis, opened in 1987. Both locations open at 5:30 AM daily and accept cash only.

In 2020, Indianapolis rapper Tevin Studdard released a song called "Long's Bakery Music Video" during which he raps about eating Long's donuts. The video has had over 390,000 views on YouTube. That same year David Letterman received the Bill McGowan Leadership Award in Indianapolis. During the award event, he tossed Long's donuts into the audience.

Long's has thrived by appealing to an ethnically diverse consumer base, from the largely Black neighborhood surrounding its 16th Street store to residents of nearby Speedway and suburban commuters stopping by as they drive into downtown Indianapolis. Anthropologist Paul Mullins wrote that Long's "flourished in the race of a relatively typical tale of spatial transformation, demographic shifts, and quite radical changes in how Americans have eaten in the last century".

== Cuisine ==
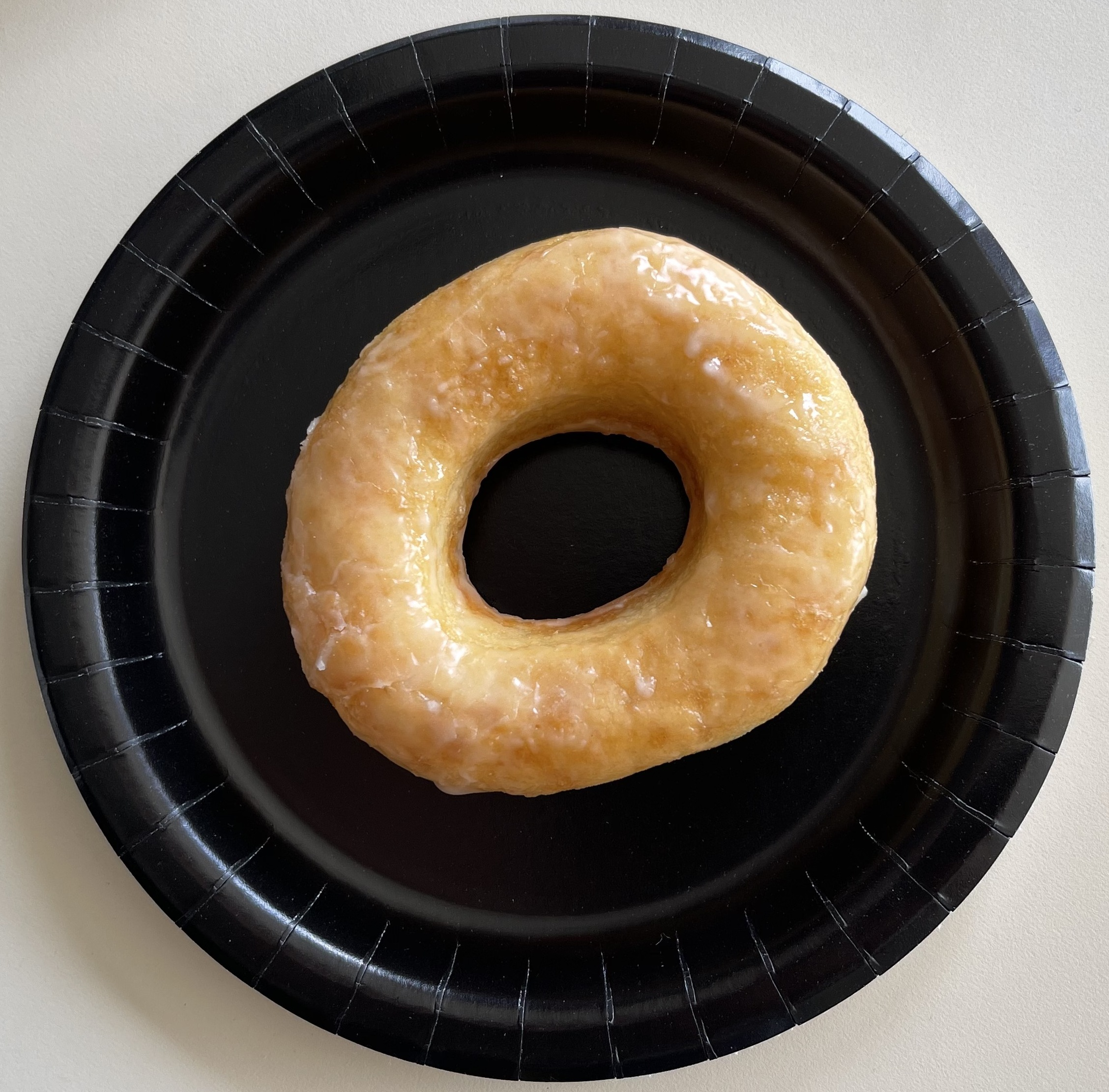
Long's famous glazed yeast donut

The bakery specializes in donuts. Their most popular is a glazed yeast donut, for which up to 20 people will wait in line on Saturday mornings. They also produce apple cinnamon fries, apple fritters, Long Johns, and cake donuts.

== Reception ==
Long's has been named one of the best donut shops in the United States by Thrillist and one of the best eating establishments in Indianapolis by Eater. It is also consistently named one of the best donut shops in Indiana and Indianapolis by local media, including the Indianapolis Star. It has been called one of the "essential eats" of Indianapolis by Indianapolis Monthly.

The original location is situated 1 3/4 miles (2.8 km) east of the Indianapolis Motor Speedway. It is popular with both fans of and participants in the Indianapolis 500.

== See also ==
- List of doughnut shops
- List of attractions and events in Indianapolis
