= Theresa A. Singleton =

American archaeologist

Theresa Singleton
- Born: April 15, 1952 (age 74); Charleston, South Carolina, United States
- Occupation: Archaeologist

Academic background
- Education: Trinity Washington University (BA); University of Florida (PhD)

Academic work
- Main interests: Archeological Study of the African Diaspora, Slavery in the United States

Theresa A. Singleton (born 15 April 1952) is an American archaeologist and writer who focuses on the archaeology of African Americans, the African diaspora, and slavery in the United States. She is a leading archaeologist applying comparative approaches to the study of slavery in the Americas. Singleton has been involved in the excavation of slave residences in the southern United States and in the Caribbean. She is a professor of anthropology at Syracuse University, and serves as a curator for the National Museum of Natural History.

== Biography ==
Singleton was born in Charleston, South Carolina on April 15, 1952. She attended Bishop England High School, where she graduated in 1970. She earned her Bachelor of Arts Degree at Trinity Washington University, formerly known as Trinity College, majoring in anthropology-archaeology, in 1974. She then attended the University of Florida, where she earned her Master of Arts in anthropology. In 1980, Singleton became the first African American woman to earn a doctorate in historical archaeology and African American history and culture from the University of Florida. She began her research career by studying the Gullah-Geechee of coastal Georgia.

In 1991, Singleton worked as an associate curator of historical archaeology for the Smithsonian Institution. Singleton and Elizabeth Scott created the Gender and Minority Affairs Committee in the Society for Historical Archaeology. In 2014, she became the first African American to be awarded the J.C. Harrington Award.

Singleton has served on a number of editorial boards, including the International Journal of Historical Archaeology, Archaeologies (World Archaeological Congress), the Journal of African Diaspora Archaeology and Heritage, and over a dozen other professional boards and committees.

== Work ==
The Journal of American History called The Archaeology of Slavery and Plantation Life (1985), edited by Singleton, "a notably coherent group of papers that allow historians to look in new and stimulating directions to analyze the past." Singleton also edited I, Too, Am American: Archaeological Studies of African American Life (1999) which tells "the story of anonymous black Americans, forgotten in written records."

Singleton's book, Slavery Behind the Wall: An Archaeology of a Cuban Coffee Plantation (2015), is a monograph that situates her excavations at the Cuban coffee plantation of Cafetal Biajacas within the comparative context of Caribbean coffee and sugar plantations.

== Bibliography (selected) ==
- The Archaeology of Slavery and Plantation Life. Orlando, FL: Academic Press. 1985. ISBN 9780126464801. (editor)
- Singleton, Theresa A. (1990). "The Archaeology of the Plantation South: A Review of Approaches and Goals". Historical Archaeology. 24 (4): 70–77. doi:10.1007/BF03373498. JSTOR 25616051. S2CID 163830922.
- The Archaeology of the African Diaspora in the Americas. Ann Arbor, MI: Society for Historical Archaeology. 1995. ISBN 9781886818002.
- Singleton, Theresa A. (1997). "Facing the Challenges of a Public African-American Archaeology". Historical Archaeology. 31 (3): 146–152. doi:10.1007/BF03374238. JSTOR 25616556.
- 'I, Too, Am America': Archaeological Studies of African American Life. Charlottesville: University of Press of Virginia. 1999. ISBN 9780813918426. (editor)
- Singleton, Theresa (1999-04-01). "The Slave Trade Remembered on the Former Gold and Slave Coasts". Slavery & Abolition. 20 (1): 150–169. doi:10.1080/01440399908575273. ISSN 0144-039X.
- Slavery Behind the Wall: An Archaeology of a Cuban Coffee Plantation. with Paul A. Shackel. Gainesville: University Press of Florida. 2015. ISBN 9780813060729.
