= Pilar Luna =

Mexican underwater archaeologist (1944–2020)

- Born: María del Pilar Luna Erreguerena; 1944; Tampico, Tamaulipas, Mexico
- Died: 15 March 2020 (aged 75–76); Guadalajara, Jalisco Mexico
- Education: Anthropology / Archaeology
- Alma mater: National School of Anthropology and History (ENAH)
- Occupation: Underwater Archaeology
- Employer(s): National Institute of Anthropology and History (INAH)
- Known for: Founding INAH's underwater archaeology division and co-authoring the UNESCO Convention on Underwater Heritage
- Awards: J. C. Harrington Medal

María del Pilar Luna Erreguerena (1944 – 15 March 2020) was a Mexican underwater archaeologist, pioneer in the field of archaeology, who founded the Division of Underwater Archaeology of the National Institute of Anthropology and History (INAH). She was awarded her undergraduate degree by the National School of Anthropology and History and the National Autonomous University of Mexico (UNAM), from which she then obtained her master's degree in Anthropological Sciences.

After 1980 she was the head of the Underwater Archeology Area of the National Institute of Anthropology and History (INAH) of Mexico. She was a member, among other associations, of the Consultative Council of Cultural Heritage Underwater of the United Nations Educational, Scientific and Cultural Organization (UNESCO), as well as member emeritus of the Advisory Council on Underwater Archaeology Society for Historical Archaeology and International Grant Advisor for the National Geographic Society. She was the first Latin American woman and only the second underwater archaeologist to receive the J. C. Harrington Medal and is considered the pioneer of aquatic archaeology in Mexico.

== Early life ==
María del Pilar Luna Erreguerena was born in 1944 in Tampico, Tamaulipas, Mexico. Her father had immigrated to Mexico from Sahagún of the Tierra de Campos district of Spain and worked his way up to owning a jewelry store. Luna was the youngest of five children. When she was six, her family moved to Mexico City and by the age of eight, she had completed lifeguard training with the Red Cross.

== Career ==
Luna began her career working as a secretary in the family business and then worked as a teacher in a sport center. She spent twelve years teaching disabled children how to swim. At the age of 27, while still working as a swimming instructor, she decided to return to school. Originally an anthropology major, Luna, who was taking classes at the National Institute of Anthropology and History (Spanish: Instituto Nacional de Antropología e Historia) took a class on general archaeology given by the National Museum of Anthropology. In a lecture about the Abu Simbel temples, re-discovered during the construction of the Aswan Dam, she began to question the fate of Mexico's underwater legacy. Searching for information, Luna discovered the book, Archaeology Under Water, by George F. Bass and decided she wanted to become an aquatic archaeologist. Then near the end of her studies, Luna, who had gone to a cave to study some chultuns near Acapulco, contracted histoplasmosis. Her recovery was a slow process, which took more than a year.

When, due to the histoplasmosis, she was barred from underwater activities, Luna began working at the Templo Mayor in Tenochtitlan, where the disk of Coyolxauhqui had just been found. She was approached by Manuel Gandara, head of the National Institute of Anthropology and History (Spanish: Instituto Nacional de Antropología e Historia (INAH)) to organize a course on undersea archaeology. She contacted Bass to help with lectures and curricula and he agreed to come with one of his students, Donald H. Keith. As part of the course, students excavated at Media Luna, a spring in San Luis Potosí, discovering 20,000-year-old mammoth skulls. At the end of the course, Bass asked her to accompany him on a dive to explore the Turkish Mediterranean. Receiving clearance from her doctor, Luna agreed to the trip, which included dives on a boat from the Byzantine period and a Greek boat dating to the Christian era.

In 1978, immediately upon her return from Turkey, Luna got a message from Keith, who was working at the Institute of Nautical Archaeology in Texas. He alerted her that sports divers had located some guns in the Gulf of Mexico. The tip led to the recovery of two cannon and a bronze plate that were dated to 1552 and later, were housed in the Museo de San José el Alto, in Campeche. Shortly thereafter, Luna first heard of the shipwreck Nuestra Señora del Juncal, when Burt Webber, a diver and treasure hunter who had made other finds in the Caribbean, applied for a permit to recover relics. After an 18-month battle, Mexico refused to offer permits to commercial enterprises, and in February 1980, Luna founded the Division of Underwater Archaeology (Spanish: Subdirección de Arqueología Subacuática (SAS)) under the direction of INAH. She is considered the founder of underwater archaeology in Latin America.

In 1990, a team of subaquatic archaeologists, including U.S. researchers James P. Delgado and Larry Nordby, worked with Luna to excavate the wreck of the USS Somers, which had been discovered in 1986 by George Belcher. Belcher had been hired to look in the coastal waters of Veracruz for artifacts for a new state museum in Xalapa. Upon locating the vessel, Belcher reported the find to the National Park Service, because of its significance in U.S. history for the "Somers Affair", upon which Herman Melville based his novella, Billy Budd. The venture was one of the few undersea archaeological projects jointly conducted by two governments. The team confirmed the ship identity, which had sunk during the Mexican–American War, and documented numerous intact features in their bilateral inspection of the wreck, which has since become a protected site.

Soon after, Luna gained wide notice for standing up to the treasure hunters working for Odyssey Marine Exploration. Odyssey executives tried many methods of influence to gain a foothold into Mexican waters, and while Luna considered resigning, she held firm in her refusal to allow commercial excavation. Recognizing that having the site designated as a UNESCO World Heritage Site would help protect it, in 1995, Luna drafted a proposal to protect the entire Fleet of New Spain from 1630 to 1631. With help from archivists in Spain and fishermen, Luna began researching the entire fleet, recognizing that there had to be more losses than just the flagship. They were able to tag many wrecks without the use of modern technology, although only a few were from the sixteenth and seventeenth centuries.

Luna was involved in many projects, including the Manila Galleon off the coast of Baja California, Nevado de Toluca near Edomex's coastline, and Banco Chinchorro of Quintana Roo. She has spearheaded an atlas and registry for the study and preservation of the caves and cenotes of the Yucatán Peninsula, working on projects to conserve and protect Mexico's underwater and submerged heritage. Luna worked with UNESCO in the development of the Convention on the Protection of the Underwater Cultural Heritage, which was adopted in 2001 and signed the same year by Mexico. The treaty was ratified in 2005 and entered into force in 2009.

In 2014, Mexico and Spain signed a collaboration agreement to jointly develop their undersea heritage, the first two countries to sign such an agreement, and one of the few in which a colony and colonizer have worked together to preserve their shared cultural patrimony. Luna was hopeful that the agreement might finally lead to the location and excavation of the Juncal.

== Recognition and honors ==
Luna was the first Latin American to receive the J. C. Harrington Award from the Society for Historical Archaeology, in 2011, only the fourth woman from throughout the world, and second aquatic archaeologist (the other was her mentor Bass), to be so honored. In 2016, Luna was awarded the Research Prize of the Spanish Geographical Society for her work in studying and preserving submerged cultural heritage. The award was presented at the Mutua Madrileña auditorium in Madrid in March.

That same year, she was honored with Toni Carrell, Dolores Elkin, and Margaret Leshikar-Denton receiving the Society for Historical Archaeology's Award of Merit. The award, given in conjunction with the Advisory Council on Underwater Archaeology, recognized the four women for their role in the ratification and implementation of the UNESCO Convention for underwater archaeology.

== Death ==
Luna died 15 March 2020 in Guadalajara, Jalisco, Mexico. No cause of death was mentioned.
