= Southport, Indiana =

- City
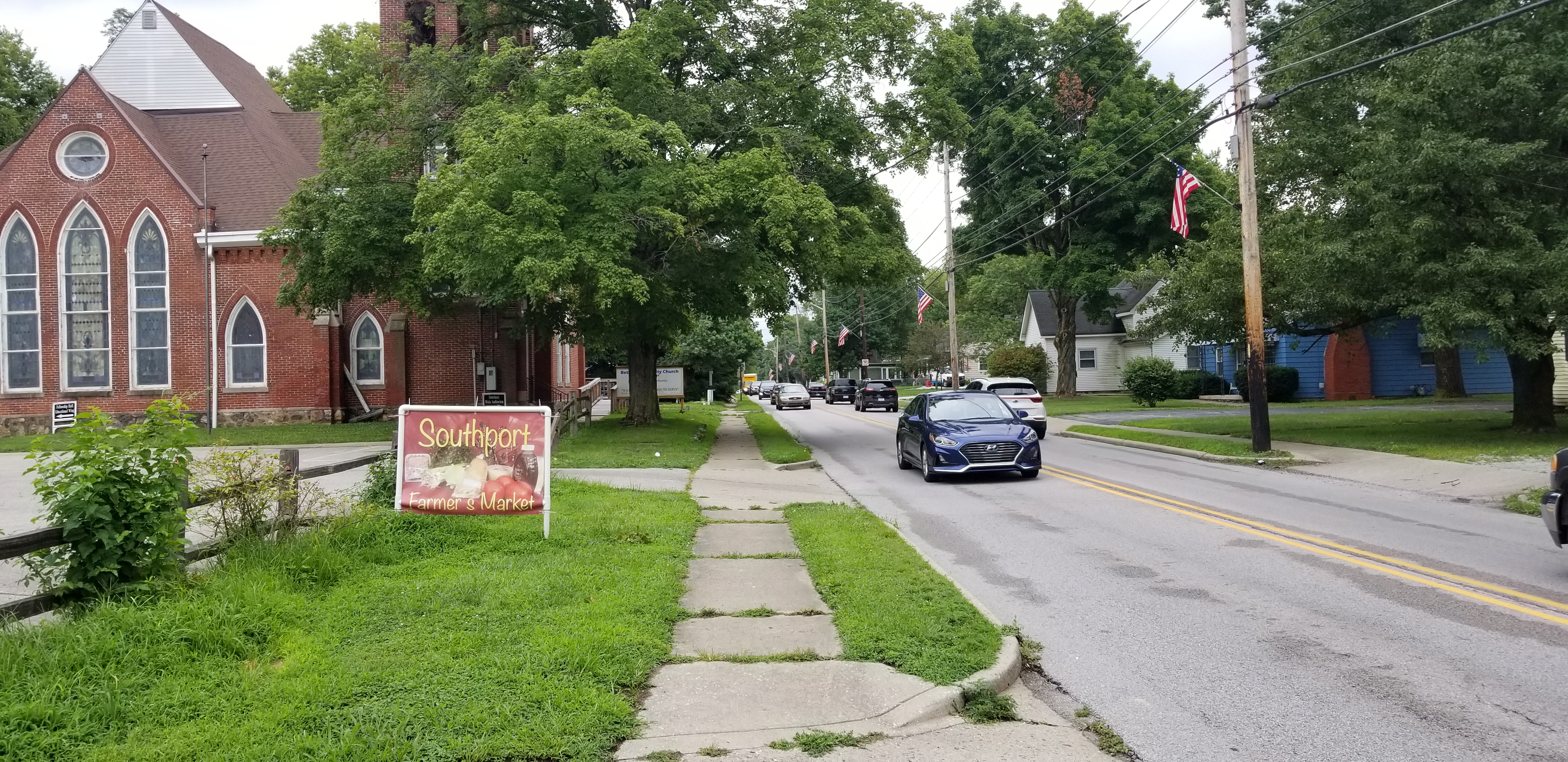
- Bethel Community Church and Southport Farmers Market

- Seal

- Location in Marion County, Indiana
- Coordinates: 39°39′41″N 86°07′18″W
- Country: United States
- State: Indiana
- County: Marion
- Township: Perry
- Founded: 1832

Government
  - Type: City Council
  - Mayor: Jim Cooney (R)

Area
  - Total: 0.63 sq mi (1.63 km^{2})
  - Land: 0.63 sq mi (1.63 km^{2})
  - Water: 0 sq mi (0.00 km^{2}) 0%
- Elevation: 781 ft (238 m)

Population (2020)
  - Total: 2,123
  - Density: 3,382.8/sq mi (1,306.09/km^{2})
- Time zone: UTC-5 (EST)
  - Summer (DST): UTC-4 (EDT)
- ZIP code: 46227
- Area code: 317
- FIPS code: 18-71486
- GNIS feature ID: 2395920
- Website: www.in.gov/cities/southport/

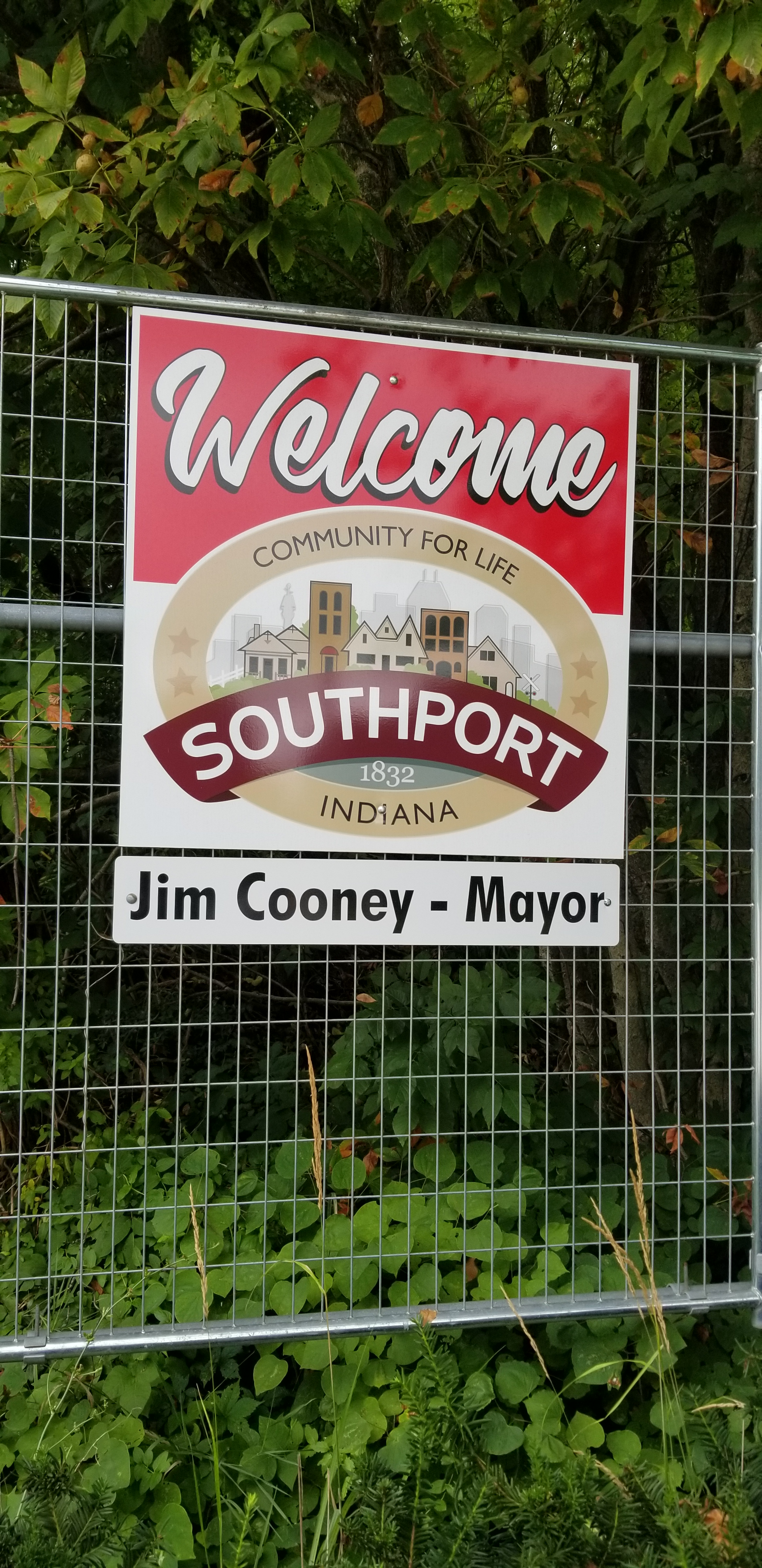
Welcome sign

Southport is an excluded city in Perry Township, Marion County, Indiana, United States. The population was 2,123 at the 2020 census, up from 1,712 in 2010.

== History ==
The area that is now known as Southport was a wooded area until the first European American settlers arrived in the 1820s. Early settlers included Jacob Smock and Randall Litzey in 1822, Samuel Brewer in 1823, Benjamin McFarland in 1826, and Samuel and Mary Bryan in 1828. Mary Bryan is remembered as one of the first European American women to cross the Cumberland Mountains. By 1828 Southport was a stagecoach stop on the Madison–Indianapolis road. Southport claims it was founded in 1832. The town was platted in 1852.

In 1847 the Jeffersonville, Madison and Indianapolis Railroad was opened through Southport, increasing traffic to and through the town, and bringing increased development. By 1884 the population had reached 388. By 1960 it was 892. Southport contained a post office until 1960.

== Geography ==
Southport is located in southern Marion County. It is bordered to the north by the town of Homecroft. Downtown Indianapolis is 8 miles (13 km) to the north.

According to the U.S. Census Bureau, Southport has a total area of 0.63 square miles (1.63 km^{2}), all land. Little Buck Creek passes through the northern part of town, flowing generally west to the White River.

== Demographics ==
=== Racial and ethnic composition ===
Southport, Indiana – Racial and ethnic composition Note: the US Census treats Hispanic/Latino as an ethnic category. This table excludes Latinos from the racial categories and assigns them to a separate category. Hispanics/Latinos may be of any race.
Race / Ethnicity (NH = Non-Hispanic)	Pop 2000	Pop 2010	Pop 2020	% 2000	% 2010	% 2020
White alone (NH)	1,772	1,582	1,201	95.68%	92.40%	56.57%
Black or African American alone (NH)	7	30	14	0.38%	1.75%	0.66%
Native American or Alaska Native alone (NH)	0	2	1	0.00%	0.12%	0.05%
Asian alone (NH)	16	18	747	0.87%	1.05%	35.19%
Native Hawaiian or Pacific Islander alone (NH)	0	0	1	0.00%	0.00%	0.05%
Other race alone (NH)	0	4	0	0.00%	0.23%	0.00%
Mixed race or Multiracial (NH)	11	17	70	0.59%	0.99%	3.30%
Hispanic or Latino (any race)	44	59	89	2.38%	3.45%	4.19%
Total	1,852	1,712	2,123	100.00%	100.00%	100.00%

Historical population
Census	Pop.	Note	%±
1880	388		—
1890	324		−16.5%
1900	285		−12.0%
1910	352		23.5%
1920	458		30.1%
1930	521		13.8%
1940	549		5.4%
1950	730		33.0%
1960	892		22.2%
1970	2,342		162.6%
1980	2,266		−3.2%
1990	1,969		−13.1%
2000	1,852		−5.9%
2010	1,712		−7.6%
2020	2,123		24.0%
U.S. Decennial Census

=== 2020 census ===
As of the 2020 census, Southport had a population of 2,123. The median age was 35.0 years. 28.4% of residents were under the age of 18 and 13.4% of residents were 65 years of age or older. For every 100 females, there were 96.9 males, and for every 100 females age 18 and over there were 98.7 males.

100.0% of residents lived in urban areas, while 0.0% lived in rural areas.

There were 708 households in Southport, of which 40.8% had children under the age of 18 living in them. Of all households, 54.9% were married-couple households, 15.7% were households with a male householder and no spouse or partner present, and 22.7% were households with a female householder and no spouse or partner present. About 19.8% of all households were made up of individuals, and 9.6% had someone living alone who was 65 years of age or older.

There were 736 housing units, of which 3.8% were vacant. The homeowner vacancy rate was 0.5% and the rental vacancy rate was 8.2%.

=== 2010 census ===
As of the census of 2010, there were 1,712 people, 696 households, and 484 families living in the city. The population density was 2,717.5 inhabitants per square mile (1,049.2/km^{2}). There were 763 housing units at an average density of 1,211.1 per square mile (467.6/km^{2}). The racial makeup of the city was 94.1% White, 1.8% African American, 0.1% Native American, 1.1% Asian, 1.8% from other races, and 1.2% from two or more races. Hispanic or Latino of any race were 3.4% of the population.

There were 696 households, of which 30.0% had children under the age of 18 living with them, 51.3% were married couples living together, 12.9% had a female householder with no husband present, 5.3% had a male householder with no wife present, and 30.5% were non-families. 24.0% of all households were made up of individuals, and 10.4% had someone living alone who was 65 years of age or older. The average household size was 2.46 and the average family size was 2.89.

The median age in the city was 41.3 years. 22.1% of residents were under the age of 18; 7.8% were between the ages of 18 and 24; 24.4% were from 25 to 44; 29.9% were from 45 to 64; and 15.7% were 65 years of age or older. The gender makeup of the city was 48.1% male and 51.9% female.

=== 2000 census ===
As of the census of 2000, there were 1,852 people, 733 households, and 521 families living in the city. The population density was 2,886.2 inhabitants per square mile (1,114.4/km^{2}). There were 769 housing units at an average density of 1,198.4 per square mile (462.7/km^{2}). The racial makeup of the city was 96.54% White, 0.38% African American, 0.11% Native American, 0.86% Asian, 1.30% from other races, and 0.81% from two or more races. Hispanic or Latino of any race were 2.38% of the population.

There were 733 households, out of which 32.3% had children under the age of 18 living with them, 56.9% were married couples living together, 10.2% had a female householder with no husband present, and 28.8% were non-families. 23.9% of all households were made up of individuals, and 8.0% had someone living alone who was 65 years of age or older. The average household size was 2.53 and the average family size was 2.97.

In the city, the population was spread out, with 24.4% under the age of 18, 7.4% from 18 to 24, 29.8% from 25 to 44, 26.0% from 45 to 64, and 12.4% who were 65 years of age or older. The median age was 39 years. For every 100 females, there were 97.0 males. For every 100 females age 18 and over, there were 94.7 males.

The median income for a household in the city was $56,719, and the median income for a family was $59,926. Males had a median income of $48,295 versus $28,125 for females. The per capita income for the city was $24,374. About 4.3% of families and 6.2% of the population were below the poverty line, including 7.2% of those under age 18 and 3.6% of those age 65 or over.

== Education ==
Southport is in the Metropolitan School District of Perry Township. Southport Elementary School, operated by the district, is within the city boundaries. Zoned schools include Homecroft Kindergarten, Southport Elementary School, Southport Middle School, and Southport High School.

The Southport branch of the Indianapolis Public Library, while not actually in Southport, lies immediately west of the city's boundary on Stop 11 Road.

== See also ==
- Long's Bakery
- List of cities surrounded by another city
- List of neighborhoods in Indianapolis
