= Margaret Leshikar-Denton =

Marine archaeologist and museum director

Margaret E. "Peggy" Leshikar-Denton is an archaeologist specialising in underwater archaeology, and director of the Cayman Islands National Museum.

== Education ==
Leshikar-Denton has a B.F.A. and an M.A. from the University of Texas at Austin and a Ph.D. from Texas A&M University where her thesis was on the Wreck of the Ten Sail, a 1794 shipwreck off Cayman. Her thesis title was "The 1794 Wreck of the Ten Sail, Cayman Islands, British West Indies: A Historical Study and Archaeological Survey".

== Career ==
Leshikar-Denton was appointed as director of the Cayman Islands National Museum in 2011, having first been appointed to a post in the museum in 1986. She has worked on archaeological sites in countries including Mexico, Spain, Jamaica, Turks and Caicos and Turkey. She is a research associate of the Institute of Nautical Archaeology (INA) at Texas A&M University.

She contributed the chapter "Caribbean Maritime Archaeology" to the Oxford Handbook of Maritime Archaeology.

In 1998 and 1999, she was the UNESCO representative at meetings of the Latin American and Caribbean Technical Commission on Underwater Cultural Heritage, and in 2001, she worked on the UNESCO Convention on the Protection of the Underwater Cultural Heritage as a member of the International Council on Monuments and Sites delegation.

She is a past secretary of the International Committee on Underwater Cultural Heritage (ICUCH) of the International Council on Monuments and Sites (ICOMOS), and represents the Cayman Islands on the committee.

== Recognition ==
In 2016 she was awarded the Society for Historical Archaeology's award of merit for her work on the protection of underwater cultural heritage.

== Personal life ==
She has lived in the Cayman Islands since 1986, having first visited in 1980 with a team from the Institute of Nautical Archaeology (INA) at Texas A&M University.

== Selected publications ==
- Leshikar-Denton, Margaret E. (2020). Cayman's 1794 Wreck of the Ten Sail : peace, war, and peril in the Caribbean. Tuscaloosa. ISBN 9780817359652.
- Leshikar-Denton, Margaret E.; Luna Erreguerena, Pilar, eds. (2016). Underwater and maritime archaeology in Latin American and the Caribbean. London: Taylor & Francis. ISBN 9781315416083.
- Leshikar-Denton, Margaret (2014). "Caribbean Maritime Archaeology". In Ford, Ben; Hamilton, Donny L.; Catsambis, Alexis (eds.). The Oxford handbook of maritime archaeology. New York. ISBN 9780199705153.
