= J. C. Harrington Award =

Award in archaeology

The J. C. Harrington Award was established in 1981 (44 years ago) by the Society for Historical Archaeology and is named in honor of J. C. Harrington (1901–1998), a pioneer founder of historical archaeology in North America. The award is presented for a "life-time of contributions to the discipline centered on scholarship". The award is an inscribed medal. No more than one Harrington Award is presented each year.

== List of medal recipients ==
Source: Society for Historical Archeology

- 1982 J. C. Harrington
- 1983 Charles H. Fairbanks
- 1984 John L. Cotter
- 1985 Kenneth E. Kidd
- 1986 George I. Quimby
- 1987 Arthur Woodward*, Stanley South
- 1988 Edward B. Jelks
- 1989 Bert Salwen* Carlyle Shreeve Smith
- 1991 Ivor Noël Hume
- 1993 Bernard L. Fontana
- 1995 Kathleen K. Gilmore
- 1997 James Deetz
- 1999 George F. Bass
- 2000 Roderick Sprague
- 2001 Roberta S. Greenwood
- 2002 Charles E. Cleland
- 2003 Merrick Posnansky
- 2004 Kathleen A. Deagan
- 2005 Marcel Moussette
- 2006 Donald L. Hardesty
- 2007 William Kelso
- 2008 James E. Ayres
- 2009 Robert L. Schuyler
- 2010 Judy Bense
- 2011 Pilar Luna Erreguerena
- 2012 George Miller
- 2013 Mary Beaudry
- 2014 Theresa A. Singleton
- 2015 Douglas D. Scott
- 2016 Mark P. Leone
- 2017 Leland Ferguson
- 2018 Julia A. King
- 2019 Charles E. Orser
- 2020 Henry M. Miller
- 2022 Martha A. Zierden
- 2023 Julia G. Costello
- 2024 Paul R. Mullins*, David G. Orr
- 2025 Paul A. Shackel

* awarded posthumously

== See also ==
- List of archaeology awards
- List of history awards
