= Stanley South =

American archaeologist (1928–2016)

Stanley A. South
- South at the Brunswick Town site, c. 1960s
- Born: Stanley Austin South; February 2, 1928; Boone, North Carolina, U.S.
- Died: March 20, 2016 (aged 88); Columbia, South Carolina, U.S.
- Education: Appalachian State University (B.S., Education); University of North Carolina at Chapel Hill (M.A., Anthropology)
- Known for: Historical archaeology Mean Ceramic Dating; Artifact Patterning Analysis
- Awards: J. C. Harrington Award (1987); Order of the Palmetto (1999)
- Scientific career
- Fields: Archaeology
- Workplaces: State Archives of North Carolina; South Carolina Institute of Archaeology and Anthropology
- Thesis: A Study of the Prehistory of the Roanoke Rapids Basin (1959)
- Academic advisors: Joffre L. Coe

Stanley A. South (February 2, 1928 - March 20, 2016) was an American archaeologist who was a major proponent of the processual archaeology movement. South's major contributions to archaeology deal in helping to legitimize it as a more scientific endeavor. Additionally, South participated in the excavation and research of a number of historic sites throughout North and South Carolina, including Town Creek Indian Mound, Charles Towne Landing (SC), Brunswick Town, North Carolina, Bethabara Historic District (the first Moravian settlement in what is now Winston-Salem, NC), the John Bartlam site at Cain Hoy (SC), and Santa Elena (near Beaufort, SC), as well as Fort Dobbs and the Fayetteville Arsenal.

Stanley South was an important pioneer of the theoretical background of Historical archaeology. He first worked as state archaeologist in North Carolina and in 1969 became professor at the South Carolina Institute of Archaeology and Anthropology at the University of South Carolina.

== Publications ==
=== Monographs ===
- Indians in North Carolina (1959)
- Method and Theory in Historical Archeology (1977)
- Historical Archaeology in Wachovia: Excavating Eighteenth-Century Bethabara and Moravian Pottery (1999)
- Archaeological Pathways to Historic Site Development (2002)
- An Archaeological Evolution (2005)
- Archaeology at Colonial Brunswick (2010)

=== Edited volumes ===
- Research Strategies in Historical Archeology (1977)

=== Articles ===
- 1955: "Evolutionary Theory in Archaeology." Southern Indian Studies 7: 10-32.
- 1972: "Evolution and Horizon as Revealed in Ceramic Analysis in Historical Archaeology." Conference on Historic Site Archaeology Papers 6(2): 71–116.
- 1978: "Pattern Recognition in Historical Archaeology." American Antiquity 43(2): 223-30.
- 1978: "Research Strategies for Archaeological Pattern Recognition on Historic Sites." World Archaeology 10(1): 36-50.
- 1979: "Historic Site Content, Structure, and Function." American Antiquity 44(2): 213-237.
- 1988: "Whither Pattern?" Historical Archaeology 22(1): 25-28.
