= Haughville, Indianapolis =

Neighborhood in Indianapolis, Indiana, US

- Haughville Historic District
- U.S. National Register of Historic Places
- U.S. Historic district
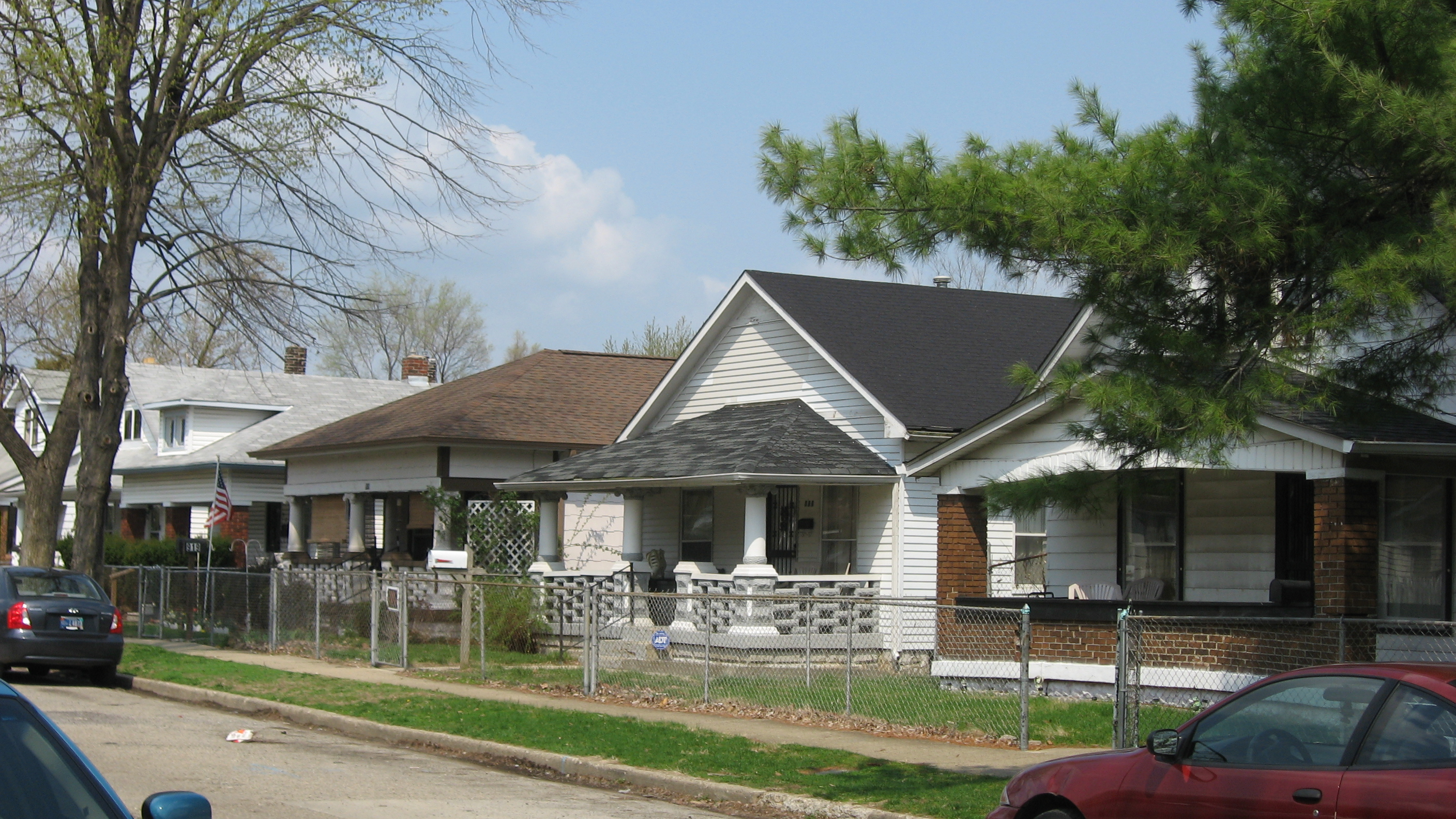
- Houses on Warman Avenue

- Location within Indianapolis Location within Indiana Location within the United States
- Location: Indianapolis, Indiana
- Coordinates: 39°46′41″N 86°12′12″W
- Area: 67 acres (27 ha)
- Architect: Bedell, George
- Architectural style: Late Victorian, Romanesque
- NRHP reference No.: 92001652
- Added to NRHP: December 9, 1992

Haughville is a neighborhood west of downtown Indianapolis. Its borders are roughly White River Parkway to the east, Tibbs Avenue to the west, 16th Street to the north, and Michigan Street to the south. It was first settled in the 1830s and grew after a bridge over White River was built connecting to Indianapolis, which annexed the town in 1897. The modern version of the bridge is also the connection between Haughville on the west side of the river and the Sidney & Lois Eskenazi Hospital and the Indiana University Indianapolis and Purdue University in Indianapolis campuses on the east. The population in the late 1890s included Slovenian, German, and Irish immigrants, among other European immigrants. In the 21st century, the neighborhood suffers from a high crime rate and low property values.

== History ==
A portion of the neighborhood, roughly bounded by 10th Street, Belleview Place, Walnut Street. and Concord Street, is listed on the National Register of Historic Places as the Haughville Historic District, a national historic district. The district encompasses 329 contributing buildings. This area includes the site of the former housing project, Concord Village.

The area was first settled in the 1830s when it became home to a number of merchants, whose small shops sprouted up near the west landing of the then-brand-new Washington Street Bridge over the White River. By the 1880s, encouraged by the bridge and proximity to a number of new railroad lines, the town became home to a number of Irish, German, and later Slovene immigrants, many of whom worked in the neighborhood's two iron foundries or in meat-packing plants. The Haugh and Ketcham Iron Works gave the town its name. The area was incorporated in 1883 and annexed by Indianapolis in 1897.

By 1900, almost half of the neighborhood's inhabitants were Slovene, many of whom attended St. Anthony's Catholic church. Due to tensions with the largely Irish population at St. Anthony's parish, the Slovenian community petitioned Vicar General Denis D. O'Donaghue to build their own church. Permission was received and Holy Trinity Slovenian Catholic Church began in April 1906. Holy Trinity is an international historical landmark. It was first designated a national church, then later as a territorial church by the Catholic hierarchy. Holy Trinity eventually became home to a school, a number of local organizations, and a Slovene community center. The church closed its doors in 2015. The neighborhood's Slovene past is one of the reasons that Indianapolis has a sister-city relationship with Piran, Slovenia. The Slovenian National Home was formed in 1906 in a basement of a home across the street from Holy Trinity Slovenian Catholic Church as a place to congregate outside of the church and home. Today the "Nash" is located at 2717 W. 10th street, where it has been a pillar of the community since 1940. The National Home is a private club for Slovenian people, their descendants, and friends.

The application to be a Historic Neighborhood indicates the period of significance to be 1895 to 1942, and shows a map of the location of the area relative to Indianapolis. A map of the district itself is also available. The Haughville Historic District was added to the National Register of Historic Places in 1992.

== Demographics ==
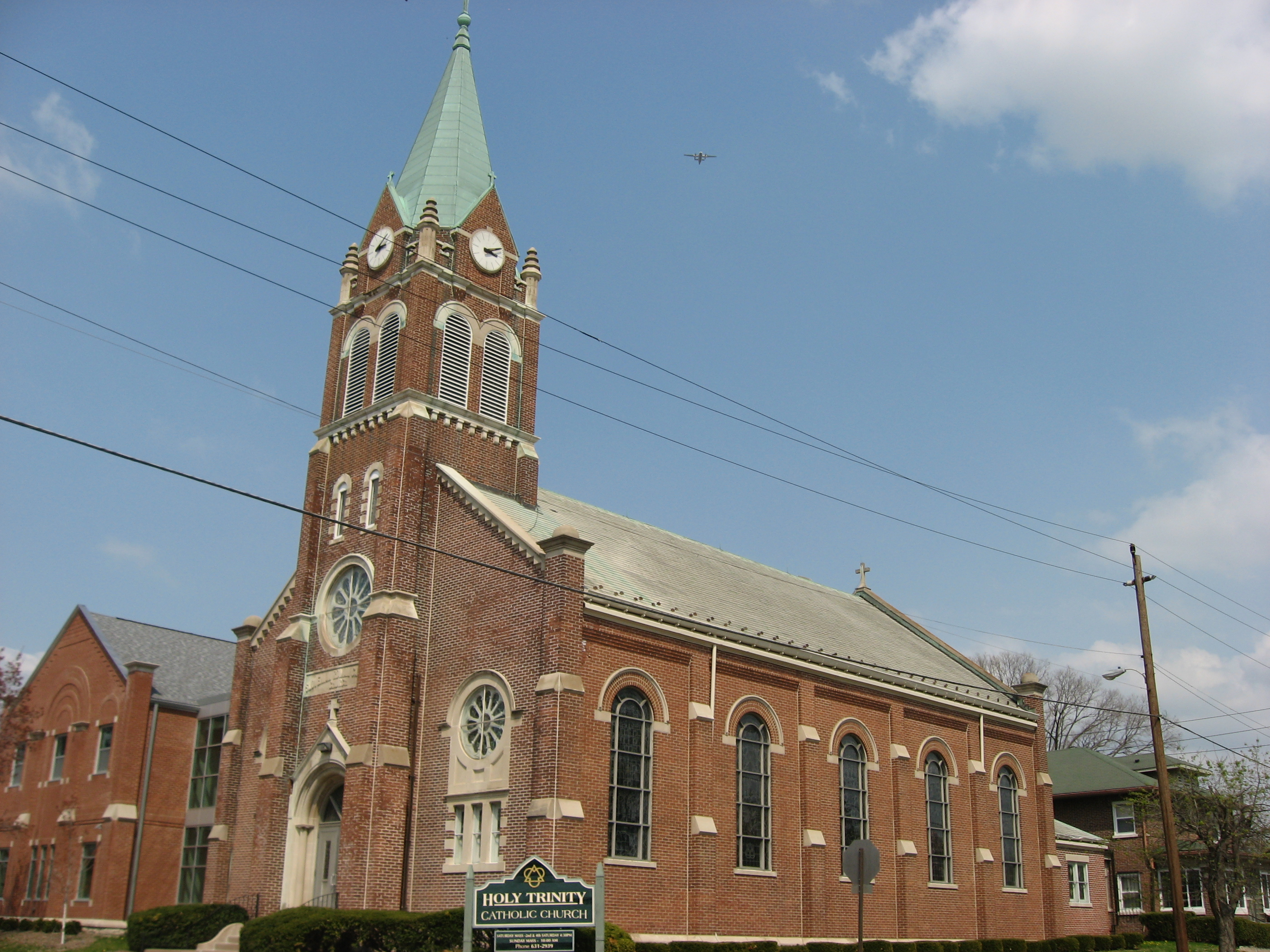
Holy Trinity Catholic Church, historically the center of the community

As of 2011, there were an estimated 8,043 people, a slight increase since 2000. However this represents the over Near Westside Weed and Seed area, which incorporates the population of a small section of other neighborhoods surrounding Haughville. The population of Haughville itself is estimated at 6,500, while the makeup of Haughville (excluding Stringtown and other neighboring areas) is approximately 92 percent African-American or Black descent. The remaining percent of the area is said to be a mixture of White (Non-Hispanic) and an increasing Hispanic population.

Of the adult population (25 and older), 40.7% do not have a high school diploma. The overall neighborhood's per capita income is $9,760 and an average household income of $17,321 making the entire neighborhood well below the average per capita and household income of Indianapolis.

== Crime ==
Crime problems began in the area after multiple business were closed down and drugs swept through the neighborhood. In 1991 Indianapolis Police Department statistics recorded 2 murders, 13 rapes, 47 robberies, 99 aggravated assault and 110 burglaries. Since 1992, Haughville has been a member of Indianapolis's Weed and Seed initiative, a federal program that targets high crime areas in Indianapolis and attempts to lower the amount of crime. It was the first neighborhood in Indianapolis to participate in this program.

== Education ==
Haughville has a public library, which is the oldest continuously operating branch of the Indianapolis Public Library.

== Notable people ==
- Wes Montgomery, acclaimed jazz guitarist.
- Hyapatia Lee, sex worker and activist of Cherokee and Irish descent.

== See also ==
- Lentz Park, a small neighborhood park
- Long's Bakery, landmark neighborhood business
- List of African-American neighborhoods
- List of neighborhoods in Indianapolis
- National Register of Historic Places listings in Marion County, Indiana
