= Regional Cities Initiative =

Indiana program

The Regional Cities Initiative is a program within Indiana counties that aims to attract talent through quality-of-place initiatives and improve skilled worker retention.

== Initiative ==
The Regional Cities Initiative is an Indiana state initiative designed to attract new talent to the state of Indiana. The initiative fosters regional collaboration between stakeholders and local communities. Each region pursuing the initiative established their own Regional Development Authority (RDA), all under the Indiana Regional Development Authority Statute. The Indiana RDAs were created to manage the Regional Cities Initiative which looks to empower two selected regions with $42 million each for designated projects that would help attract and retain worker talent, help Indiana compete nationally and supply funds for quality-of-place projects. The Regional Cities Initiative was established in 2015 by the Indiana Legislature and driven by Indiana Governor Mike Pence and the Indiana Economic Development Corporation (IEDC).

Two Regional Cities will be selected to receive a combined total of $84 million. In the initiative, two House Acts were submitted: House Enrolled Act 1403 and House Enrolled Act 1001, which were enacted when the Indiana Regional Cities Initiative was signed into law on May 7, 2015.

== House Enrolled Act 1403 ==
The Indiana House Act 1403 created the Indiana Regional City Fund, to be administered by the IEDC. The fund provides grants and loans to regional development authorities. It requires that applicants be regional development authorities, and expands the range of municipalities that are eligible to establish a development authority.

== House Enrolled Act 1001 ==
The Indiana House Act 1001 established the Indiana Regional Cities Development Fund and provided the IEDC with the authority to spend $84 million for the Regional Cities Initiative. Included in the Act is authorization for the Department of Revenue to conduct a tax amnesty program. The first $84 million of all revenue generated through the tax amnesty program must be deposited into the Indiana Regional Cities Development Fund.

== Results and Three Indiana Cities Selected ==
On 15 December 2015, the Governor of Indiana, Mike Pence and the Indiana Economic Development Corporation (IEDC) Board of Directors announced the approved plans presented by regional development organizations in North Central, Southwest, and Northeast Indiana. Each region will need approval from the state legislature on each area of their plans but they may receive up to $42 million (US) in state-matching funds. The first $84 million of all revenue generated through the tax amnesty program was increased to $126 million allowing three regional cities to be selected instead of the initial two the first draft of the Regional Cities Initiative outlined.

The plans presented by each Indiana region in October were:

- North Central – "Innovate Indiana" Plan (selected by the Strategic Review Committee). In the plan, 39 projects are included to change the economic status of the region using physical, environmental, and intellectual resources in region to develop economic opportunities.
- Northwest – "Indiana's Third Coast Gateway Initiative" Plan. - Focused primarily on commuter railways and transportation, the plan centered on using technology to upgrade the railway services and technology in Gary, Indiana through Michigan City, Indiana.
- Northeast – "Road to One Million" Plan (selected by the Strategic Review Committee). This plan focused on growing the population of Northeast Indiana to one million residents and included 38 projects to be completed over a two-year span.
- West Central – "Wabash River Region" Plan. Several colleges reside in this area of Indiana. This proposed plan would invest in recruitment and growth of the universities in West Central Indiana through five projects. The plan focused on Harrison College (Indiana), Indiana State University, Ivy Tech Community College, Rose-Hulman Institute of Technology, St. Mary of the Woods College, and Vincennes University.
- Central – "Metro Momentum Agenda" Plan. Using funds awarded to the Central Region of Indiana, this plan would accelerate the progress of three construction projects to bring in employers that would attract and/or retain skilled workers in the area.
- East Central – "ADVANCE" Plan. The East Central Indiana plan centered on upgrading the communities in the region through 14 projects focusing on reinvention and renovations to motivate entrepreneurship and stimulate economic growth.
- Southwest – "Indiana's Great Southwest" Plan (selected by the Strategic Review Committee). In the Southwest Indiana plan, the focus was on improving the region through a mixture of new transformative projects addressing retention of talent, livability and connectivity through technology and development.
