= Douglas D. Scott =

Douglas D. Scott is an American archaeologist most notable for his work at the Little Bighorn in the mid-1980s. Working with Richard Fox, Melissa Connor, Dick Harmon, and staff and volunteers from the National Park Service, Scott worked to sketch out a field methodology that has enabled archaeologists to systematically investigate battlefields. This work is internationally recognized as constituting a great step forward in our ability to interpret battlefields archaeologically, regardless of the extent of the historical record. At the Little Bighorn, the fieldwork produced an interpretation of the battle that for the first time gave a clear understanding of the way the battle developed and pointed out some of the glaring inaccuracies of the historiography of the event. The fieldwork also helped determine which of the 242 headstones to the 210 U.S. soldiers lost at the Little Bighorn were erroneous, and recovered skeletal elements allowed one of the soldiers to be positively identified. It was not as successful in recovering the remains of 24 men lost in Deep Ravine and whose whereabouts are unknown to this day.

Scott continued doing battlefield archaeology by working at Little Bighorn every season for 23 years. He also directed work at Big Hole Battlefield National Historical Site, Sand Creek National Historic Site, Wilson’s Creek National Battlefield, Pea Ridge National Battlefield Park, and Monroe’s Crossroads Battlefield. He has assisted, advised, or volunteered on over 40 other battlefield and conflict site investigations in the U.S., England, and Belgium, including Washita National Historic Site and Honey Springs Battlefield with Bill Lees. In 2017 Scott began working with Revolutionary War researcher Joel Bohy and others on live fire validation studies of Revolutionary War fowlers and muskets. This led to a study of surviving bullet struck structures and objects from the first day of the American Revolution, April 19, 1775, which was published in book form by Mowbray Publishing under the title of "Bullet Strikes from the First Day of the American Revolution."

In another convergence the work at the Little Bighorn and the discovery of soldiers’ skeletal remains brought Scott into contact with Clyde Snow. Snow did an exceptional analysis of those remains, but also cajoled Doug Scott and Melissa Connor into taking the methods they developed in battlefield recovery to the field of forensic science. Snow’s statement that they should take their methods to a “real” battlefield led them to working for Physicians for Human Rights, the UN El Salvador Truth Commission, the UN Truth Commission for Former Yugoslavia, the International Criminal Tribunal for Former Yugoslavia, the International Criminal Tribunal for Rwanda, the U.S. State Department on a case in northern Cyprus, for PHR on the Greek side of Cyprus, and for the Regime Crime Liaison Office in Iraq. Connor shifted from prehistoric and historic archaeology to full-time forensic archaeology in 2000. She now directs the Forensic Investigation Research Station (FIRS) for Colorado Mesa University in Grand Junction, Colorado. Both Scott and Connor are Fellows of the American Academy of Forensic Sciences.

For this work, Scott has been honored with awards from the National Park Service. In 1992, he was awarded the Department of Interior's Meritorious Service Award and Medal for career accomplishments and innovative research. He served as the president of the Society for Historical Archaeology from 2006-2007. In 2015 Scott received the J. C. Harrington Award, presented by the Society for Historical Archaeology for his life-time contributions to archaeology centered on scholarship. Scott is also a member of the editorial board for the "Journal of Conflict Archaeology".

== Professional publications ==
=== Books ===
Scott, Douglas and Richard Fox, Jr. 1987 Archeological Insights into the Custer Battle: A Preliminary Assessment. Norman, University of Oklahoma Press.

Scott, Douglas D., Richard A. Fox, Jr., Melissa A. Connor, and Dick Harmon 1989 Archaeological Perspectives on the Battle of the Little Bighorn. Norman: University of Oklahoma Press.

Scott, Douglas D., P. Willey, and Melissa Connor 1998 They Died With Custer: The Soldiers’ Skeletons From The Battle of the Little Bighorn. University of Oklahoma Press, Norman.

Greene, Jerome A. and Douglas D. Scott 2004 Finding Sand Creek: History and Archeology of the 1864 Massacre. University of Oklahoma Press, Norman.

Scott, Douglas, Lawrence Babits, and Charles Haecker (editors) 2006 Fields of Conflict: Battlefield Archaeology from Imperial Rome to Korea, 2 Volumes. Praeger Security Press, Westport, CT.

Cruse, J. Brett with contributions by Martha Doty Freeman and Douglas D. Scott (contributor) 2005 Battles of the Red River War: Archaeological Perspectives on the Indian Campaign of 1874. Texas A&M University Press, College Station.

Scott, Douglas, Lawrence Babits, and Charles Haecker (editors) 2009 Fields of Conflict: Battlefield Archaeology from Imperial Rome to Korea. Potomac Books, Washington, DC (softcover edition).

Geier, Clarence R., Lawrence E. Babits, Douglas D. Scott, and David G. Orr (editors) 2010 Historical Archaeology of Military Sites: Method and Topics. Texas A&M Press, College Station.

Scott, Douglas D. 2013 Uncovering History: Archeological Investigations at the Little Bighorn Battlefield National Monument. University of Oklahoma Press, Norman.

Scott, Douglas D., Peter Bleed, and Stephen Damm 2013 Custer, Cody and the Grand Duke: Camp Alexis and the Royal Buffalo Hunt in Nebraska. University of Oklahoma Press, Norman.

Geier, Clarence R., Douglas D. Scott, and Lawence E. Babits (eds.) 2014 From These Honored Dead: Historical Archaeology of the American Civil War. University Press of Florida, Gainesville.

=== Book chapters ===
Scott, Douglas and Melissa Connor 1995 Post Mortem at the Little Bighorn. In Annual Editions: Archaeology 1995-1996, edited by Linda Hasten, pp 143–147, Dushkin Publishing, Gillford, Connecticut.

Scott, Douglas D. and Clyde Collins Snow 1996 Archeology and Forensic Anthropology of the Human Remains from the Reno Retreat Crossing. Reprinted in Images of the Recent Past, Readings in Historical Archaeology edited by Charles E. Orser, Jr., pp 355–367, Altimira Press, Walnut Creek, California.

Scott, Douglas D. 1996 Archaeological Perspectives on the Battle of the Little Bighorn: A Retrospective. In Legacy, New Perspectives on the Battle of the Little Bighorn, edited by Charles E. Rankin, pp 167–188, Montana Historical Society Press, Helena.

Scott, Douglas D. 1997 Interpreting Archaeology at Little Bighorn Battlefield National Monument. In Presenting Archaeology to the Public, Digging for Truths, edited by John H. Jameson, Jr., pp 234–242m, Altimira Press, Walnut Creek, California.

Scott, Douglas and P. Willey 1997 Little Bighorn: Human Remains from the Custer National Cemetery. In Remembrance: Archaeology and Death edited by David A. Poirier and Nicholas F. Bellantoni, pp 155–171. Bergin and Garvey, Westport, Connecticut.

Scott, Douglas D. 1998 Euro-American Archaeology. In Archaeology of the Great Plains, edited by W. Raymond Wood, pp. 481–510. University of Kansas Press, Lawrence.

Scott, Douglas D. and Melissa A. Connor 1999 Post-Mortem at the Little Bighorn. In Lessons from the Past: An Introductory Reader in Archaeology edited by Kenneth L. Feder, pp 123–129. Mayfield Publishing, Mountain View, CA.

Scott, Douglas D. 1999 Archaeologists: Battlefield Detectives. In Little Bighorn Remembered: The Untold Story of Custer's Last Stand edited by Herman J. Viola, pp 165–177, Times Books, New York.

Scott, Douglas D. and Melissa A. Connor 1999 Post-Mortem at the Little Bighorn. In The Great Plains: A Cross-Disciplinary Reader Department of English, Oklahoma State University, pp 290–299. Harcourt Brace Custom Publishers, Orlando, FL.

Scott, Douglas D., Peter Bleed, Andrew E. Masich, and Jason Pitsch 1999 An Inscribed Native American Battle Image from the Little Bighorn Battlefield. In The Great Plains: A Cross-Disciplinary Reader Department of English, Oklahoma State University, pp 300–318. Harcourt Brace Custom Publishers, Orlando, FL

Scott, Douglas D. and Peter Bleed 2002 Custer and the Grand Duke in Nebraska, 1872: Some Insights from New Photographic Evidence. In Custer and His Times, Book 4 edited by John P. Hart, pp 94–109. Little Bighorn Associates, La Grange, IL.

Scott, Douglas D. 2004 Men with Custer, The Dead Tell Their Tale. In G. A. Custer: His Life and Times, by Glenwood J. Swanson, pp 266–287. Swanson Productions, Agua Dulce, CA.

Scott, Douglas D. 2005 Interpreting Archeology at the Little Bighorn Battlefield National Monument. In Preserving Western History, edited by Andrew Gulliford, pp 20–31. University of New Mexico Press, Albuquerque.

Scott, Douglas D. 2005 The Archaeology of Battlefields. In The Archaeology of War, edited by Mark Rose, pp 257–259. Hatherleigh Press, New York.

Scott, Douglas and Lucien Haag 2006 “Listen to the Minié Balls”: Identifying Firearms in Battlefield Archaeology. In Fields of Conflict: Battlefield Archaeology from Imperial Rome to Korea, Volume I, edited by Douglas Scott, Lawrence Babits, and Charles Haecker, pp 102–120. Praeger Security Press, Westport, CT.

Scott, Douglas and Lucien Haag 2009 “Listen to the Minié Balls”: Identifying Firearms in Battlefield Archaeology. In Fields of Conflict: Battlefield Archaeology from Imperial Rome to Korea, edited by Douglas Scott, Lawrence Babits, and Charles Haecker, pp 102–120. Potomac Books, Washington, DC (softcover edition).

Scott, Douglas D. 2009 Studying the Archaeology of War: A Model Based on the Investigation of Frontier Military Sites in American Trans-Mississippi West. In International Handbook of Historical Archaeology, edited by Teresita Majewski and David Gaimster, Springer, NY, pp 299–318.

Scott, Douglas D. 2009 Battlefield Archaeology: Some New Insights into Custer’s Last Stand. In Schlachtfeldarchäologie, edited by Harald Meller, pp 253–257. Tagungen des Landesmuseums für Vorgeschichte, Halle.

Scott, Douglas D. 2010 Military Medicine in the Pre-Modern Era: Using Forensic Techniques in the Archaeological Investigation of Military Remains. In Historical Archaeology of Military Sites: Method and Topics, edited by Clarence R. Geier, Lawrence E. Babits, Douglas D. Scott, and David G. Orr, pp21–30. Texas A&M Press, College Station.

Scott, Douglas D. 2010 Tragedy of the Nez Perce War of 1877: An Archaeological Expression. In Historical Archaeology of Military Sites: Method and Topics, edited by Clarence R. Geier, Lawrence E. Babits, Douglas D. Scott, and David G. Orr, pp21–30. Texas A&M Press, College Station.

Scott, Douglas D. 2013 Uncovering History: Archeological Investigations at the Little Bighorn Battlefield National Monument. University of Oklahoma Press, Norman.

Scott, Douglas D. 2014 Civil War Archaeology in the Trans-Mississippi West. In From These Honored Dead: Historical Archaeology of the American Civil War, edited by Clarence R. Geier, Douglas D. Scott, and Lawrence E. Babits, pp. 7–25. University Press of Florida, Gainesville.

Scott, Douglas D., Steve J. Dasovich, and Thomas D. Thiessen 2014 Archaeology of the First Battle of Boonville, Missouri, June 17, 1861. In From These Honored Dead: Historical Archaeology of the American Civil War, edited by Clarence R. Geier, Douglas D. Scott, and Lawrence E. Babits, pp. 26–41. University Press of Florida, Gainesville.

Thiessen, Thomas D, Steve J. Dasovich, and Douglas D. Scott 2014 Massacre and Battle at Centralia, Missouri, September 27, 1864: Historical and Archaeological Perspectives. In From These Honored Dead: Historical Archaeology of the American Civil War, edited by Clarence R. Geier, Douglas D. Scott, and Lawrence E. Babits, pp. 26–56. University Press of Florida, Gainesville.

Scott, Douglas D. 2014 Reassessing the Meaning of Artifact Patterning. In Battles and Massacres on the Southwestern Frontier: Historical and Archaeological Perspectives, edited by Ronald K. Wetherington and Frances Levine, pp 134–152, University of Oklahoma Press, Norman.

Bohy, Joel and Douglas Scott 2024 “Dreadful were the Vestiges of War” Bullet Strikes from the First Day of the American Revolution. Mowbray Press, Woonsocket, RI.
