= Paul R. Mullins =

Archaeologist

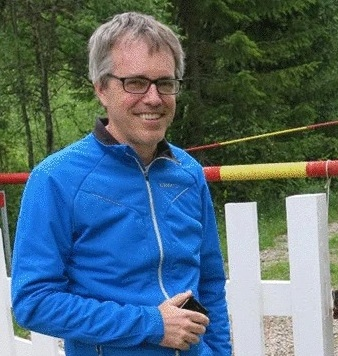
- Born: September 22, 1962
- Died: April 16, 2023 (aged 60)
- Occupation: Anthropologist

Academic background
- Education: James Madison University (BS) University of Maryland (MA) University of Massachusetts (PhD)
- Alma mater: University of Massachusetts
- Thesis: The contradictions of consumption: An archaeology of African America and consumer culture, 1850-1930

Academic work
- Discipline: Anthropology
- Sub-discipline: Material culture
- Institutions: Indiana University Purdue University Indianapolis

Paul R. Mullins (September 22, 1962 - April 16, 2023) served as a professor of Anthropology at Indiana University Purdue-University Indianapolis. His research contributed to the public history of Black neighborhoods in Indianapolis.

== Early life and education ==
Mullins' was born on September 22, 1962. His father, Wayne, served in the U.S. Air Force as a mechanic.

Mullins graduated from James Madison University with a Bachelor of Science degree in 1984. Afterwords, he received graduate degrees from the University of Maryland (M.A., 1990) and the University of Massachusetts (Ph.D., 1996).

== Career ==
Mullins worked at George Mason University for three years as a visiting professor prior to joining the faculty at IUPUI in 1999. Soon after starting at IUPUI, Mullins won the John L. Cotter Award in Historical Archaeology in recognition of his monograph studying African American communities in Annapolis, Maryland, Race and Affluence: An Archaeology of African America and Consumer Culture.

In addition to his role at IUPUI, Mullins served as the president of the Society for Historical Archaeology (SHA) from 2012 to 2013.

His research focused on historical archaeology as an approach to understanding culture, history, and place. In Indianapolis, his work helped to build public histories of Black neighborhoods in the city. In 2008 he conducted an archaeological dig to better understand the Black neighborhood that had been displaced by the IUPUI campus.

Mullins also studied elements of material culture in Finland and took research trips to the country. In 2012 he received a Fulbright Scholarship to conduct research in Oulu. Later the University of Oulu honored Mullins with the title of docent.

In 2016 he received the Chancellor's Fellowship. The fellowship funded a research project entitled, "Invisible Indianapolis: Race, Heritage, and Community Memory in the Circle City".

Mullins' academic writings were supplemented with two blogs that he maintained for a general readership, “Invisible Indianapolis” and “Archaeology and Material Culture”. In these writings, Mullins drew attention to how IUPUI displaced the African American neighborhoods that once occupied the campus location. These blogs also provided a public account for the neighborhoods where he conducted his community-engaged research.

Mullins' work in Indianapolis contributed to the reclassification of the death of George Tompkins as a lynching.

In 2022, the Indianapolis City-County Council adopted a resolution recognizing Mullins for "advancing the public’s understanding of the role of the color line in shaping the history and contemporary landscape of Indianapolis.”

== Honors and awards ==
- John L. Cotter Award in Historical Archaeology, Society for Historical Archaeology (2000)
- Fulbright Scholarship (2012)
- 2016 IUPUI Chancellor's Fellowship (with coauthor, Susan Hyatt)
- Dorothy Riker Hoosier Historical Award, Indiana Historical Society (2020)
- Chancellor's Professor, IUPUI (2022)
- J. C. Harrington Award, Society for Historical Archaeology (2024)

== Selected works ==
Mullins authored four books and more than fifty peer reviewed journal articles. Selections include:

- "The Landscape of Black Placelessness: African American Place and Heritage on the Postwar Campus." Historical Archaeology 57, 828–841 (2023)
- Revolting Things An Archaeology of Shameful Histories and Repulsive Realities. (UP of Florida, 2021)
- The Archaeology of Consumer Culture. (UP of Florida, 2011)
- The Archaeology of Consumption. Annual Review of Anthropology 40, 133-144 (2011)
- Glazed America: A History of the Doughnut. (UP of Florida, 2008)
- "Representing colonizers: An archaeology of creolization, ethnogenesis, and indigenous material culture among the Haida." Historical Archaeology 34, 73–84 (2000)
- Race and the genteel consumer: Class and African-American consumption, 1850–1930. Historical Archaeology 33, 22–38 (1999).
- Race and Affluence: An archaeology of African America and Consumer Culture. (Kluwer Academic, 1999).

== Personal life ==
Mullins married Marlys Johanne Pearson with whom he raised a son, Aidan. He enjoyed cycling, popular culture, and sweets. His fondness for sweets and his interests in popular culture were combined to produce an academic book about doughnuts. He also was an avid runner. Mullins ran his last half marathon two months before receiving a diagnosis of cancer.

Mullins died at the age of 60 from glioblastoma on April 16, 2023.
