= Kathleen K. Gilmore =

American archaeologist (1914–2010)

- 1968 excavation at the San Francisco Mission in east-central Texas
- Born: Kathleen Kirk; November 12, 1914; Altus, Jackson County, Oklahoma
- Died: March 18, 2010 (aged 95); Dallas, Dallas County, Texas
- Other name: Kathleen Kirk Gilmore
- Occupation: archaeologist
- Years active: 1962-2010
- Known for: Spanish colonial archaeology

Kathleen K. Gilmore (November 12, 1914 – March 18, 2010) was an American archaeologist and specialist on Spanish colonial archaeology. She was the first archaeologist to prove the location of Fort St. Louis, established by the French explorer, René-Robert Cavelier, Sieur de La Salle. She received the J. C. Harrington Award of Society for Historical Archaeology in 1995, the first woman ever honored by the society.

== Early life ==
Kathleen Kirk was born on November 12, 1917, in Altus, Jackson County, Oklahoma, to Jesse (née Horton) and Rufus Patrick Kirk. She was the middle child of three and had an older sister and younger brother. Raised in Altus until she was twelve, the family moved to Tulsa, where she completed her secondary education. Beginning her studies in geology at the University of Tulsa (TU), after three years, she transferred to the University of Oklahoma (OU), where she obtained a bachelor of science degree. Hoping to work in the growing petroleum industry, she was unable to find employment in the male-dominated field during the Great Depression and enrolled in business school to learn secretarial skills.

== Career ==
Kirk had worked throughout her schooling at the Bone and Joint Center in Tulsa and the TU Library, after graduation she looked for a position as a geologist and found few opportunities for women. Taking a job as an editorial assistant at the American Association of Petroleum Geologists in Tulsa, she worked for a year, before she found a steady job. In the late 1930s, Kirk moved to Houston and took a job working as a stenographer for Humble Oil. Her employers appreciated her knowledge of geological terms, but hired her as administrative staff. Disliking the stenography pool, Kirk left to work as a typist with Superior Oil Company in Corpus Christi and eventually returned to Houston to work with Standard Oil of Kansas, where she remained until 1940, when she married petroleum engineer, Robert Beattie Gilmore, on Christmas Day.

Soon after their marriage, the couple moved to Dallas, where Robert took a position with DeGolyer and MacNaughton, of which he would later become president. Gilmore remained at home and raised their four daughters, Betsy, Judy, Pat and Sally and then in the early 1960s, she became involved with the Dallas Archaeological Society, participating in field schools, hosted around Dallas. One of the first digs she participated in was at the Gilbert site in Rains County, Texas, in 1962. The following year, Gilmore enrolled in a new graduate-level program for anthropology offered by Southern Methodist University (SMU), studying under the tutelage of Ed Jelks and Fred Wendorf. Her first published paper, issued in 1967, dealt with the excavations she had conducted at Presidio San Luis de las Amarillas and at Mission Santa Cruz de San Sabá.

At the time of her studies, there was an ongoing academic debate in the archaeological field as to whether the discipline encompassed only pre-historic sites or whether both historic and ancient sites were within the field. She attended a conference in 1967, in St. Louis of the Central States Archaeological Society, where the issue was debated, noting the ongoing reconstructions of Colonial Williamsburg. The group decided to form the Society for Historical Archaeology later that same year. As Gilmore was interested in history, she developed a method in which she used historic archival materials to inform her planning for field work, but was careful to note that flaws in records, inherent systemic biases and human error could alter the reliability of material.

Gilmore began searching for the complex of the San Xavier Mission in Milam County, Texas, in 1968, which included the missions of Nuestra Señora de la Candelaria, San Ildefonso, and San Francisco Xavier de Horcasitas, as well as the presidio of San Francisco Xavier de Gigedo. Successfully locating all three mission communities, using a Spanish survey from the time of the construction of the missions, and identifying the presidio site, the field work she conducted there became the basis of her master's thesis, The San Xavier Mission: A Study in Historical Site Identification. After completing her master's degree in 1968, Gilmore contracted to work at several sites, focusing on Caddoan excavations around Lake Palestine and Rosario Mission for the Parks Department.

Completing her PhD in 1973, with a thesis, Caddoan Interaction in the Neches Valley, Texas she was approached by Curtis Tunnell, state archaeologist of Texas to analyze materials collected from a ranch on the Garcitas Creek to determine whether it might be the location of Fort St. Louis, which had been established by the French explorer, René-Robert Cavelier, Sieur de La Salle in 1685. Analyzing artifacts and pottery sherds, she published The Keeran Site: The Probable Site of La Salle's Fort St. Louis in Texas later that same year. In 1986, she sent the pottery samples to Canada because extensive work had been done there on French ceramics of the period. Gerard Gussat analyzed the fragment and confirmed that it had been made in Saintonge and was French. Combined with the other materials she had evaluated, including Spanish artifacts, Gilmore revised her initial paper and confirmed that the site was definitively the location of Fort St. Louis. Her groundbreaking work solved the question of where the fort had been located and was the first proof of the actual site of the structure.

In 1974, Gilmore began teaching at the University of North Texas (UNT), as an adjunct professor and her appointment included a research appointment to continue her investigations. Over the next several years, Gilmore worked on numerous cultural resources management (CRM) projects for the state, including digs at Granger Reservoir, Lake Ray Roberts, Lakeview Lake, North Fork Reservoir, and a survey of sites along the Oklahoma/Texas border, known as the Red River Archaeology Project, which she directed. She also led the excavations in 1978 to survey Old Salem, North Carolina's Single Brothers Industrial Complex Site for consideration for inclusion on the National Register of Historic Places and a 1981 preliminary test at English Turn, Louisiana to identify the location of a French and later an American site of Fort St. Leon. She was elected as president of the Society for Historical Archaeology, the first woman to hold the post. She also served from 1982 to 1983 as the president of the Texas Archaeological Society.

In 1990, Gilmore left UNT and began doing consulting work. In 1993, she consulted on a project to locate the site of the Mission Santa Cruz de San Sabá, which she had reported on in 1967. The mission was located in Menard, Texas. In 1995, when La Salle's ship La Belle was located, close to the location Gilmore had predicted, she worked on the excavation, which also discovered eight Spanish cannon at the site. She was the recipient of the J. C. Harrington Award from Society for Historical Archaeology in 1995, becoming the first women honored with the award. Between 1999 and 2002, she worked in conjunction with the Texas Historical Commission on a re-examination of the Keeran site, which not only reaffirmed the accuracy of her location of Ft. Saint Louis and discovered the Spanish presidio Nuestra Señora de Loreto en la Bahía, which had been constructed atop the French fort.

In the mid-2000s, Gilmore returned to a project researching Felipe de Rábago y Terán, which she had developed an interest in when she was working on her masters thesis. The conquistador, who was the commander of the San Xavier and San Sabá presidios in central Texas, was suspected of involvement in a murder. Gilmore was determined to uncover his history and name his victim, Juana Francesca de Rodriguez, whose identity had been obscured from published accounts. Traveling to Spain, Italy and Mexico with an interpreter, and working with a palaeographer Gilmore pieced together the archival records and began compiling them into a book. During this period, she established the Texas Presidios Project, in part to locate the various sites where Rábago had command. In 2003 Gilmore became the inaugural recipient of the Curtis D. Tunnell Lifetime Achievement Award, which recognizes excellence in Texas archeology and in 2008, was honored by Governor Rick Perry and the Texas History Commission with receipt of the Governor's Award for Historic Preservation. At the time of her death, she was working on the final edits for publishing her book on Rábago, even editing in the hospital emergency room.

== Death and legacy ==
Gilmore died on March 18, 2010, at Presbyterian Hospital of Dallas, in Dallas County, Texas, from a heart attack. She is remembered as one of the first architects to study Spanish missions in Texas, one of the pioneer women in the field, and an expert on colonial archaeology.
