= Mark P. Leone =

American archaeologist and anthropologist

Mark Paul Leone (June 26, 1940 - December 11, 2024) was an American archaeologist and professor of anthropology at the University of Maryland, College Park. He was interested in critical theory as it applies to archaeology and, particularly, to historical archaeology. He directed the Archaeology in Annapolis project from 1981 to his death. This project focused on the historical archaeology of Annapolis and Maryland's Eastern Shore and features the use of critical theory. Leone was committed to public interpretation and taught his students about the relationship between public interpretation and the politics of archaeology.

== Education ==
Leone earned a Bachelor of Arts in history in 1963 at Tufts University. He received a Master of Arts in 1966 and a doctorate of philosophy in 1968, both from the University of Arizona, in anthropology.

== Academic career ==
He was an assistant professor in the Department of Anthropology at Princeton University from 1968 to 1975 before moving to the University of Maryland as an associate professor from 1976 to 1990. He became a full professor in 1990. He directed the University of Maryland Field School in Urban Historical Archaeology for several decades starting in 1981. Leone's research areas include North American archaeology, historical archaeology and outdoor history museums. In 1976, Leone began teaching at the University of Maryland, where he became the chair of the Department of Anthropology between 1993 and 2003 and chair of the University Senate in 2000 - 2001. Leone began the Archaeology in Annapolis project in 1981.

In 2016, Leone was presented the J. C. Harrington Award by the Society for Historical Archaeology (SHA).

In 2019, Leone was conferred the title of Distinguished University Professor at the University of Maryland, the highest academic honor that the university bestows on a faculty member.

Mark Leone died on December 11, 2024, at the age of 84.

== Archaeology in Annapolis (AiA) Project ==
Archaeology in Annapolis has run consistently since 1981 in Annapolis, at Wye House, where Frederick Douglass was enslaved, at William Paca's Wye Hall on Wye Island, and on “The Hill,” an African American community in Easton, Maryland.

Site reports with catalogs on nearly 40 excavations can be found on the University of Maryland's Digital Archive, known as DRUM. A physical component of the collection is housed in the National Trust room of Hornbake Library on the University of Maryland campus.

Some of the most significant sites excavated by the project include:

1. 18AP01: The William Paca House and Garden
2. 18AP45: Charles Carroll House and Garden (1987-1990 Report and 1991 Report)
3. 18AP29: Jonas Green Print Shop
4. 18TA314: Wye House and Greenhouse (Hothouse Structure, Greenhouse Interior, Wye Greenhouse, and The Long Green
5. 18QU977: Wye Hall (2003 Report and 2008 Report)
6. 18AP64: Maynard-Burgess House
7. 18AP116: James Holliday House
8. 18AP23: Reynolds Tavern
9. 18AP74: Slayton House
10. 18AP50: Bordley- Randall House
11. 18AP18: Dr. Upton Scott House
12. 18AP40: Rideout Garden
13. 18AP22: State Circle in Annapolis
14. 18AP28: Calvert House
15. 18AP47: Sands House
16. Fleet and Cornhill Streets
  1. 18AP109: 26 Market Street
  2. 18AP111: Fleet Street
  3. 18AP112: Cornhill Street
17. 18AP44: 193 Main Street (Preliminary Report 1986 and Final Report 1994)

Virtual tours of archaeological sites in Annapolis and exhibits from Annapolis and Easton can be found at the following links:

- Seeking Liberty Annapolis: An Imagined Community
- Wye House

People of Wye House contains censuses done by the Lloyd family of people they enslaved. This can be found at http://aia.umd.edu/wyehouse/.

All University of Maryland Department of Anthropology dissertations on Annapolis can be found at https://drum.lib.umd.edu/handle/1903/10991.

A list of newspaper articles by date and name of reporter from the Annapolis Evening Capital can be found here.

An overview historical maps, historical photographs, and the result of excavations on an interactive database can be found at http://preservationsearchwebgis.anth.umd.edu/.

== Selected publications ==
Edited Books

2005 The Archaeology of Liberty in an American Capital. University of California Press.

2010 Critical Historical Archaeology. Left Coast Press.

2015 Historical Archaeologies of Capitalism, Second Edition. Edited with Jocelyn E. Knauf. Springer, New York. (eBook published @ http://link.springer.com/book/10.1007/978-3-319-12760-6).

Refereed Journal Articles

1977 The New Mormon Temple in Washington, D. C. In Historical Archaeology and the Importance of Material Things. Historical Archaeology. Special Publication Series 2:43-61. Reprinted in Sunstone (a Mormon journal), September–October, 1978.

1998 Seeing: The Power of Town Planning in the Chesapeake, with Silas D. Hurry. Historical Archaeology, 32:4:34-62. Reprinted in Revealing Landscapes. Society for Historical Archaeology's series Perspectives from Historical Archaeology 2010.

2006 LiDAR for Archaeological Landscape Analysis: A Case Study of Two Eighteenth Century Maryland Plantation Sites. With James M. Harmon, Stephen D. Prince, and Marcia Snyder. American Antiquity 71:4:649-670.

2018 Waste, with Michael P. Roller. Cuadernos de Prehistoria y Arqueología de la Universidad de Granada 28:175–196.

Chapters in Books

1984 Interpreting Ideology in Historical Archaeology: Using the Rules of Perspective in the William Paca Garden in Annapolis, Maryland. In Ideology, Representation and Power in Prehistory, Tilley, C. and D. Miller, editors, pp. 25–35. Cambridge University Press. Reprinted in Readings in Historical Archaeology, edited by Charles E. Orser Jr. Alta Mira Press/Sage Publications, 1996.

2001 Spirit Management among Americans of African Descent. Mark P. Leone, Gladys-Marie Fry and Tim Ruppel. In Race and the Archaeology of Identity, edited by C. Orser, pp. 143–157. University of Utah Press.

2010 Walter Taylor and the Production of Anger in American Archaeology. In Prophet, Pariah, and Pioneer: Walter W. Taylor and Dissension in American Archaeology, edited by Maca, Allen, Reyman, Jonathon, and Folan, William, pp. 315–330. University of Colorado Press, Boulder, Colorado.
