= Mary Beaudry =

American archaeologist, educator, and author (1950–2020)

- Born: November 25, 1950
- Died: October 20, 2020 (aged 69)
- Education: Brown University; College of William and Mary
- Scientific career
- Fields: Historical archaeology, material culture
- Institutions: Boston University

Mary Carolyn Beaudry (November 25, 1950 – October 20, 2020) was an American archaeologist, educator and author whose research focused on historical archaeology, material culture and the anthropology of food. She was a professor of archaeology, Anthropology, and Gastronomy at Boston University (BU).

Beaudry participated in archaeological fieldwork in New England, Virginia, the Western Isles of Scotland and the Caribbean. She was visiting professor at the University of Sheffield and Bristol University. Towards the end of her life, Beaudry focused her research interests on the anthropology of food.

In 2013, Beaudry was the recipient of the J. C. Harrington Award and Medal in Historical Archaeology, for "life-time contributions and dedication to the discipline of Historical Archaeology".

Beaudry died of complications of an existing heart condition on October 20, 2020.

== Education ==
Beaudry attended the College of William and Mary, initially choosing a major in English, with the goal of being a writer. In 1970, she enrolled in an Introduction to Anthropology class in order to meet a college requirement. Along with her class, Beaudry was invited by the instructor to join the excavation of a prehistoric shell midden at Maycock Plantation.

During the excavation, Beaudry assisted in the discovery of the remains of a 17th-century child. The boy was unearthed wearing a copper and glass bead necklace. That discovery was a turning point for Beaudry. After learning that archaeologists can research the historical period and not just prehistory, Beaudry decided to pursue a career in historical archaeology and changed her major to Anthropology. Beaudry earned a BA in anthropology in 1973 and then went on to study at Brown University, obtaining a MA from the Department of Anthropology in 1975 and a PhD in 1980.

== Career ==
In 1980, Beaudry accepted a position as assistant professor of anthropology at Boston University (BU). One of her first projects as Assistant Professor was to help create a new program in archaeology at BU. She was promoted to Professor of Archaeology and Anthropology at BU in 2004. In 2010, Beaudry took on the additional role of Professor of Gastronomy at Boston University Metropolitan College.

Beaudry has collaborated on a number of archaeological projects in New England, Virginia, Scotland and the Caribbean. Beginning in 1985, Beaudry joined a multi-year excavation at Boott Mills, a large-scale complex of early 18th century cotton mills located in Lowell, Massachusetts. Between 1986 and 1994, Beaudry worked on an excavation at Spencer-Pierce-Little Farm. Her research on the site focused on the land use, site structures, changing agricultural methods, and the families that lived on the farm from 1635 to the present.

Beginning in 1995, Beaudry worked as a visiting professor and conducted field work and research in England and Scotland. She was a visiting professor, Department of Archaeology and Prehistory at the University of Sheffield. From 1995 to 2000, Beaudry worked with James Symonds on the Flora MacDonald project on the Island of Uist in Scotland. The project was a multi-year study with the goal of investigating medieval and post-medieval settlements.

"Through archaeological survey, excavation, and the study of historical documents and oral tradition, the project aimed to examine the responses of the 18th- and 19th-century Hebridean population to the social and economic changes wrought by agricultural 'Improvement' and the infamous 'Highland Clearances'". Fieldwork was carried out over six seasons from 1995 to 2000.

In 2003, Beaudry was visiting professor, Department of Archaeology, at the University of Bristol. She recently joined an archaeological project on the Island of Montserrat.

== Selected publications ==
=== Books ===
- Beaudry, Mary C.; et al. (2015). Beyond the Walls: New Perspectives on the Archaeology of Historical Households. University Press of Florida. p. 232. ISBN 978-0813061559.
- Beaudry, Mary; Metheny, Karen, eds. (2015). Archaeology of Food: An Encyclopedia: 2 Volumes. Rowman and Littlefield. p. 702. ISBN 978-0-7591-2366-3.
- Beaudry, Mary; Parno, Travis, eds. (2013). Archaeologies of Mobility and Movement. Springer. p. 265. ISBN 978-1461462101.
- Beaudry, Mary; Hicks, Dan, eds. (2010). The Oxford Handbook of Material Culture Studies. Oxford University Press. p. 792. ISBN 978-0199218714.
- Beaudry, Mary; Hicks, Dan, eds. (2006). The Cambridge Companion to Historical Archaeology. Cambridge University Press. p. 424. ISBN 978-0-521-61962-2.

=== Journals ===
- Beaudry, Mary; Peschel, Emily; Betherd, Jonathan; Carlsson, Dan (2017). "Who resided in Ridanäs?: A study of mobility on a Viking Age trading port in Gotland, Sweden". Journal of Archaeological Science: Reports. 13 (13): 175–184. Bibcode:2017JArSR..13..175P. doi:10.1016/j.jasrep.2017.03.049.
- Beaudry, Mary; Natascha, Mehler (2016). "The Material Culture of the ModernWorld". Post-Medieval Archaeology. 50 (1): 108–120. doi:10.1080/00794236.2016.1169811. S2CID 148210090.
- Beaudry, Mary; Walker, John; diZerega Wall, Diana (2011). "Poverty in Depth: a New Dialogue". International Journal of Historical Archaeology. 15 (4): 629–636. doi:10.1007/s10761-011-0161-y. JSTOR 41410905. S2CID 144735402.
- Beaudry, Mary (2001). "Trying to Think Progressively About 19th-Century Farms". Northeast Historical Archaeology. 31: 129–142. doi:10.22191/neha/vol31/iss1/10. PMID 20217974.
- Beaudry, Mary; et al. (1983). "A Vessel Typology for Early Chesapeake Ceramics: The Potomac Typological System". Historical Archaeology. 17 (1): 18–43. doi:10.1007/BF03374029. JSTOR 25615428. S2CID 127158093.

== Awards ==
- 2013 J. C. Harrington Award in Historical Archaeology
