= Lentz Park =

Municipal park in Indianapolis, Indiana, US

Coordinates: 39°46′39″N 86°11′45″W

Lentz Park is a 3.4-acre (1.4 ha) urban park in the Haughville neighborhood of Indianapolis, Indiana, United States. The park is named after Sarah Lentz, who sold the land to Indianapolis for $1.00 in 1928. Located at 700 North Traub Avenue, Lentz Park is five blocks west of the White River. Lentz Park was once a locale for amateur and semi-professional baseball, formerly playing host to a segregated baseball team. In addition to a baseball field, the park also had a rest station, tennis court, and horseshoe pit.

In 1970, United States Department of Housing and Urban Development funds were used to renovate the park with new basketball and baseball areas, balancing beams, rope swings, and sculptural trees. After decades of subsequent decline, Lentz Park has been left with a small children's play area and a decrepit basketball court.

== See also ==
- List of parks in Indianapolis
