= Cayman Islands National Museum =

Museum in the Cayman Islands

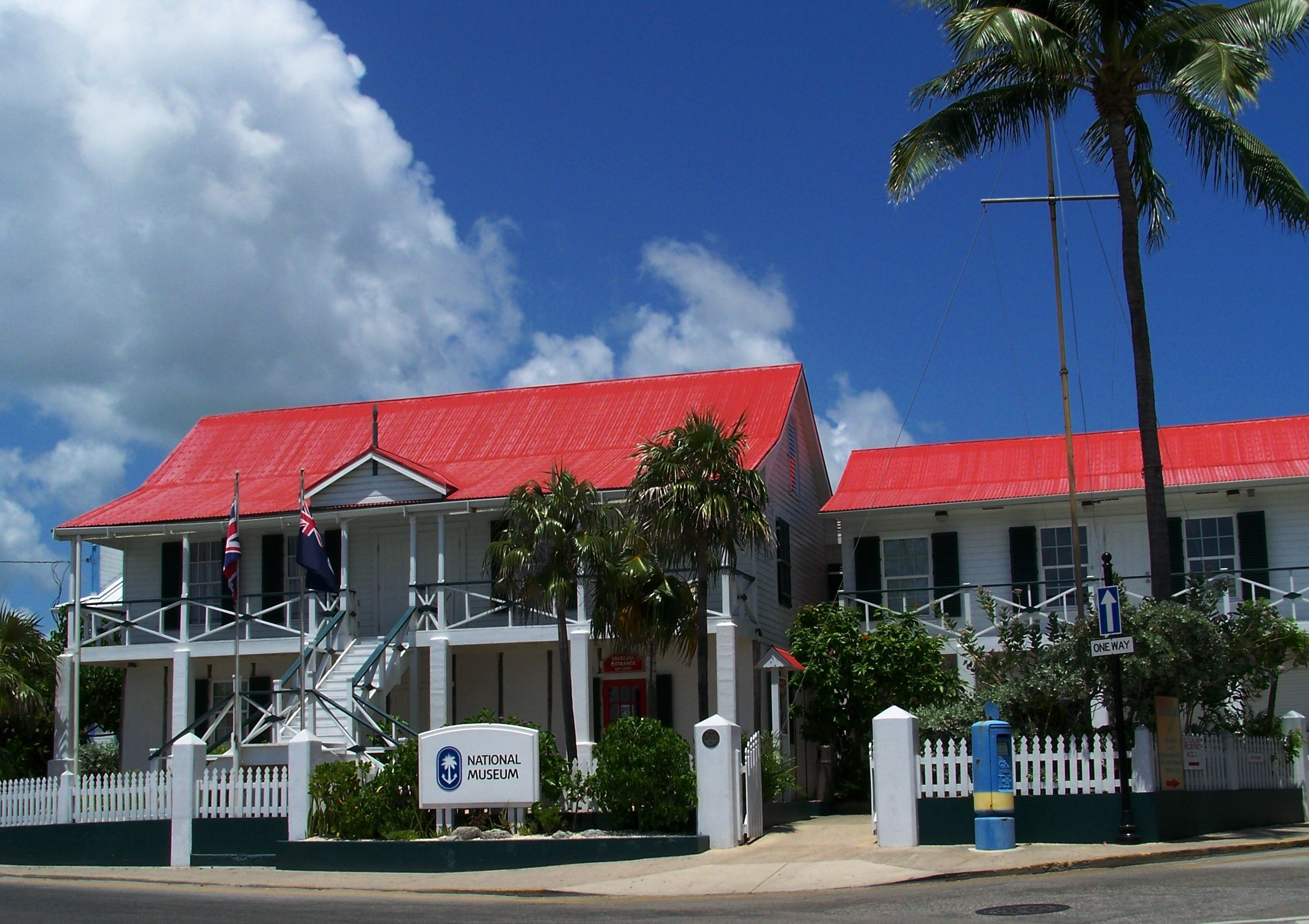
- Exterior of the museum
- Established: 1990
- Location: George Town, Grand Cayman
- Coordinates: 19.2941°N 81.3827°W
- Type: National history, natural history
- Director: Veerle Poupeye
- Website: Cayman Islands National Museum website

The Cayman Islands National Museum is a museum in the Cayman Islands. The museum is housed in the former Old Courts Building on Harbor Drive in George Town, on Grand Cayman. The museum is dedicated to the preservation, research and display of all aspects of Caymanian heritage.

== History ==
The building is the oldest on the island, dating from the 1830s - one of only a handful of structures which date from the 19th century that remain.

The museum's beginnings can be traced to the 1930s when local resident Ira Thompson began collecting Caymanian artifacts as a hobby; in 1979, the government purchased Thompson's collection and it now encompasses a major portion of the museum's collection. A new courthouse building was constructed the 1970s, and the Old Courts Building began to be used as the Lands and Survey Department building, until it was purchased in 1986 to become the home of the Thompson’s collection. The National Museum was opened in the building in 1990.

Margaret Leshikar-Denton was appointed as the museum's director in 2011, having first started working for the museum in 1986.

In 2015, a commemorative coin was minted to celebrate the 25th anniversary of the museum.

Veerle Poupeye took over as director of the museum in November 2024.

== Exhibits ==
The museum contains over 8,000 items and artifacts ranging from coins to a 14-foot catboat. The Natural History Exhibit features a 3-dimensional map depicting the underwater geological formations that surround the Cayman Islands.

There are two permanent exhibitions, galleries with space for three temporary exhibitions, and an audiovisual theatre.
