= Indianapolis Weed and Seed =

Indianapolis Weed and Seed is the name of a federal crime control/prevention initiative that serves several Indianapolis neighborhoods. The organization was founded by the city of Indianapolis in the 1990s as a way to address the crime issues that plague inner-city areas. In recent years the Weed and Seed foundation was expanded to cities all over the country, including Broward County, FL.

== See also ==
- Community Capacity Development Office
- Haughville, Indianapolis
- Riverside, Indianapolis
