= Scudo Fiscale =

Scudo Fiscale (from Italian scudo /ˈskuːdəʊ/ (=shield) and fiscale /ˈfiska:le/ (=fiscal)) known also as "Tax shield" is the Italian tax amnesty declared by the Italian Minister of Finance.

== Tax amnesty ==
Tax amnesty is a limited-time opportunity for a specified group of taxpayers to pay a defined amount, in exchange for forgiveness of a tax liability (including interest and penalties) relating to a previous tax period or periods and without fear of criminal prosecution. Its main aim is to reduce the cost caused by illegal transfers of funds to other countries. Due to Italian legislation the established bodies are required to list in their annual tax return their foreign funds, assets and related earnings as they exceed €10000. Because of that the huge amount of funds has been exported out of Italy and have never been taxed. During the Scudo Fiscale in 2001 about €56 billion was repatriated from Switzerland to Italy and generated €1.4 billion of additional tax revenues.

== Scudo Fiscale Occurrence ==
=== 2001 ===
The 2001 Scudo Fiscale brought to light that 78 billion euros were held by Italians in Switzerland.

=== 2009 ===
The Scudo Fiscale amnesty was related to tax evasions made up to December 31, 2008, and took its effect only from September 15 to December 15, 2009. The relevant law was named Imposta straordinaria sul rimpatrio di attivita` finanziarie e patrimoniali detenute fuori del territorio dello Stato ("Extraordinary tax on the repatriation of foreign financial and patrimonial assets "). The taxpayers in question had to hand over the list of all funds and assets out of Italia. The list was called "Dichiarazione riservata" (in English Private declaration) and was similar to an annual tax return. Then they paid the special amnesty tax in amount of 5% of said foreign assets. The institution undertakes to pass the tax on to the Italian Revenue without telling any information about the payer. On the other hand, the payer obtains a document which confirms a payment and guarantees dropping of more investigations or penalties. (Thus comes the name Shield.)
