= Advisory Council on Underwater Archaeology =

The Advisory Council on Underwater Archaeology (ACUA) serves as an international advisory body on issues relating to underwater archaeology, conservation, and submerged cultural resources management. The ACUA is an independent, non-profit organization closely affiliated with the Society for Historical Archaeology (SHA).

== Formation ==
Its genesis as the Council on Underwater Archaeology was in 1959 and its purpose was fully realized at a meeting in 1963 when a group of archaeologists, historians, and sport divers met in St. Paul, Minnesota for the first international Conference on Underwater Archaeology (CUA).

The first joint conference with the then fledgling Society for Historical Archaeology was held in 1970. By 1973, the present structure and name of the ACUA were established and shortly thereafter the SHA and CUA conferences merged. In 2003, the ACUA and SHA signed a Memorandum of Agreement, formalizing their relationship.

== Publications ==
The ACUA maintains several publications including:

- ACUA Underwater Archaeology Proceedings comprising papers given at the annual SHA Conference.
- Archaeological Photo Festival Competition open to all SHA members. Photos from the annual competition are used for an annual calendar provided to all SHA Conference attendees.
- The quarterly ACUA Student Newsletter, published by the ACUA Graduate Student Members.
- An introductory brochure on underwater archaeology available for download online in English, Spanish, and Portuguese.

== Awards ==
The ACUA awards the competitive George Fischer Student Travel Award annually to provide monetary value in travel support for an international maritime archaeology student to attend and present at the annual Society for Historical and Underwater Archaeology conference. The aware is named after George Fischer, a founding and emeritus member of the ACUA. Since the inaugural award in 2012, students hailing from different countries have benefited from the support to participate in the exchange of ideas at the annual conference.

== Leadership ==
The ACUA is composed of twelve individuals elected on a rotating basis for four-year terms by the membership of the Society for Historical Archaeology. The members include professionals from state and federal archaeology programs, museums, non-profit institutes, cultural resource management firms, universities, conservation laboratories, and avocational societies involved in underwater archaeology. The board elects officers for three year terms. All board terms expire at the ACUA business meeting in January.

== See also ==
- Underwater archaeology
