= Lynching of George Tompkins =

Lynching of a Black man in Indianapolis, Indiana

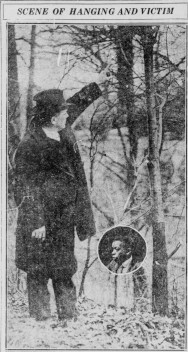
This image appeared in the Indianapolis Times on March 17, 1922. It depicted the scene where Tompkins' body was found and also included an undated photograph of George Tompkins.

George Tompkins, a young Black man living in Indianapolis, was the victim of a racial terror lynching in 1922. His death was declared a suicide by white authorities, and no further investigation of the death was undertaken by authorities at the time. In March 2022, Tompkins was memorialized by the Indiana Remembrance Coalition and his death certificate was amended to reflect his death by homicide.

== Life ==
George Tompkins was born in 1902. He migrated to Indianapolis from Frankfort, Kentucky in 1920. Prior to this move, he had resided with his great-aunt and great-uncle, Fannie and Robert Smith, since he had been placed in their care at nine months old. Upon moving to Indianapolis, Tompkins and his family first lived on Colton Street and eventually moved to Holborn Street, both locations now on the current IUPUI campus. Tompkins was employed at the Fairmount Glass Works.

== Lynching ==
George Tompkins was found dead in Riverside Park around twelve o'clock in the afternoon on March 16, 1922. He was discovered bound to a tree by his neck with a length of rope, and had his hands bound behind his back. There was also evidence that Tompkins may have been dragged due to dirt on his body. "Four or five small limbs" from the tree Tompkins was found on had been removed "apparently with a small pen knife," a sign that Tompkins' killers had possibly taken them as souvenirs of their crime.

The Indianapolis Star reported that Tompkins was a victim of lynching in their initial coverage of the incident, and police investigators and the coroner were inclined to agree. However, some detectives investigating the crime suggested that Tompkins had died by suicide. After an autopsy on March 18, 1922, the deputy coroner, George R. Christian, stated the cause of death as "strangulation by hanging from the neck" and ruled the death a suicide. Tompkins was then buried at Floral Park Cemetery on the near west side of Indianapolis, Indiana.

== Memorialization ==
On March 12, 2022, George Tompkins was memorialized by the Indiana Remembrance Coalition, a group of Indianapolis community members working to "address and acknowledge" the history of lynching in the city. At the event, Marion County Chief Deputy Coroner Alfie McGinty unveiled an updated death certificate for Tompkins, which showed the manner of death as homicide. The ceremony included the dedication of a headstone at Tompkins' grave. The grave had previously been unmarked.

On March 16, 2025, an Equal Justice Initiative marker about George Tompkins was unveiled near the location where his body was found in 1922.
