= Tax amnesty =

Tax amnesty allows taxpayers to voluntarily disclose and pay tax owing in exchange for avoiding tax evasion penalties. It is a limited-time opportunity for a specified group of taxpayers to pay a defined amount, in exchange for forgiveness of a tax liability (including interest, penalties, and criminal prosecution) relating to previous tax periods. It typically expires when some authority begins a tax investigation of the past-due tax.

In some cases, legislation extending amnesty also imposes harsher penalties on those who are eligible for amnesty but do not take it. Tax amnesty is one of voluntary compliance strategies to increase tax base and tax revenue. Tax amnesty is different from other voluntary compliance strategies in part where tax amnesty usually waives the taxpayers' tax liability. In 2016, Indonesia had run one of the biggest Tax Amnesty scheme in the world and managed to gather around US$9.61 billion as taxes in 9 months.

Introduction of amnesty in any fiscal year is to help a state treasury raise tax revenues, adding beneficiaries who have not declared their assets previously. The main purpose is to replicate the economy and encourage individuals and corporations to declare their wealth as it may arise. Under this scheme, the beneficiary just has to pay the tax on the total assets which are declared. States introduce this scheme when they believe that individuals are hiding their wealth from the tax authorities.

Tax revenues raised through these schemes are used for the well-being of the state. Every individual and company has to report annually on their business activities in their tax return. Those who remain transparent in declaring their assets and liabilities to the tax authorities do not get inquiries or investigations. Tax amnesty is beneficial for those who have been hiding or not declaring their assets fair and transparently for years, who can make their assets legitimate by declaring them whether they exist within or outside the country. When such schemes are introduced, state revenue and tax departments give time to declare their wealth without any penalty. After it elapses, there will be a penalty in addition to the original tax rate. Countries change their laws depending on various factors like the level of taxpayer participation, the overall effectiveness of tax administration and enforcement.

== Amnesty ==
=== Financial ===
There are schemes wherein the government provides financial relief to tax evaders. Under such schemes, the government decides to waive off all or part of the financial penalties which become due as a result of tax evasion. In some cases, the government only allows taxpayers to pay back the full sum in easy instalments over a longer time frame. Hence, investors gain because they can earn interest on the unpaid tax as well.

=== Legal ===
In some cases, legal immunity is not provided, so if the taxable income was generated from some illicit activity like drug smuggling or other criminal endeavours, the government could still prosecute the taxpayer.

On the other hand, there are some tax amnesty schemes that provide legal amnesty as well. These schemes basically promise that the government will simply close their eyes to the source of the taxable income as well. The government promises to not conduct any investigation or disclose any information after they receive the tax revenue, which is due to them.

== Reasons ==
There are several possible reasons for tax amnesty.

=== Economic and financial ===
During the crisis period, financial difficulties of taxpayers as well as increased public expenditures may occur. Tax amnesties are considered necessary in order to collect at least some of the tax claims. It also helps relieve the taxpayers, who are unable to pay tax debts, and revive the market.

=== Political ===
Possibility of tax amnesty may be used by political parties to gain more votes when the next election period is about to come. Determination of the extent of the amnesty is entirely a political decision and is in the government's power.

=== Technical and administrative ===
To resolve areas of confusion or defects or make radical changes in the tax system, liquidation of past periods may be necessary. It is also administratively difficult to collect tax debt from taxpayers in financial difficulties. Tax courts may have a large workload and tax collection is time consuming. Tax amnesty can be a simple way to solve these administrative difficulties.

== Negative effects ==
Many positive effects and reasons for tax amnesty are effects only in the short run. Tax amnesty have also many opponents because of the long-term effects on society. The main reason is that we must be all equal in terms of law and justice. Tax amnesty gives an advantage to those who break the law. People lose confidence in justice, and punishments lose their effectiveness. It may lead to decreasing morality and increasing tax crimes. Some of these negative effects may be eliminated with strict regulation and careful choice of who can receive tax amnesty. Tax amnesty is a limited-time opportunity for a specified group of taxpayers to pay a defined amount, in exchange for forgiveness of a tax liability relating to a previous tax period or periods and without fear of criminal prosecutions. Canada resolves this issue by waiving only the penalty and still charging the tax owing and arrears interest, removing the advantage from those who break the law, while keeping an incentive for them to pay up voluntarily.

== Countries ==
=== Australia ===
Australia has implemented several tax amnesty programs in the past, including the "Project DO IT" initiative in 2014 and the "Taxation Amnesty Initiative" in 2007.The Taxation Amnesty Initiative was a unique program that enabled qualifying individuals and businesses to reveal any tax liabilities that were not reported or underreported without facing legal consequences. The program provided a reduced penalty rate for those who willingly disclosed their tax obligations. The initiative concluded on 31 January 2008. The purpose of Project DO IT was to motivate people and companies to reveal any income or capital gains that were not reported or underreported to the Australian Taxation Office (ATO). Those who chose to disclose their tax obligations voluntarily were given a chance to receive reduced penalties and protection against criminal prosecution. The program officially concluded on 19 December 2014. During Australia's tax amnesty in 2014, thousands of rich Australians declared billions of dollars in untaxed assets and income stashed in bank accounts in other countries like Switzerland.

=== Belgium ===
In 2004, the Belgian Parliament adopted a law allowing individuals subject to Belgian income tax to regularize the undeclared, or untaxed, assets they held before 1 June 2003. The government increased the tax free portion for individuals from portion from EUR 10,160 to EUR 13,500. The law aims to eliminate the current tax system that values some benefits in kind at a flat rate, resulting in a lower tax amount than their actual value. Under the new system, certain benefits in kind, such as free accommodation, utilities, or household staff provided by a company to its director, will be taxed at their actual value. For big companies, the proposed changes to the "Definitively Taxed Income" (RDT/DBI) regime by the state would require that shares be held with a specific and durable link between the shareholder company and the company whose shares are held. The previous two-step system of considering dividends in the taxable base of the shareholder company, then deducting them, could change to a pure exemption of dividends. Additionally, the proposed changes could remove the beneficial tax regime for investment companies known as "SICAV RDT" / DBI-Bevek." The tax reform implemented in Belgium in 2017 involved significant structural changes that aimed to broaden the tax base while lowering the overall tax rate.

=== Canada ===
Canada has tax amnesty under both the Income Tax Act for income tax related offences and under the Excise Tax Act for GST/HST (goods and services tax/ harmonized sales tax) matters. The tax amnesty is referred to by the Canada Revenue Agency as the Voluntary Disclosure Program (VDP) and has its statutory authority under subsection 220(3.1) of the Income Tax Act and the sections 88 and 281.1 of the ETA which set out the rules for taxpayer relief applications. This relief is available for a 10-year period prior to the date of filing and covers unfiled tax returns and unfiled information returns such as offshore asset forms T1135 or T1134, as well as tax evasion in the form of unreported income or over claimed expenses or deductions. Eligible taxpayers will receive full penalty relief, will avoid any possible tax evasion prosecution. Only the penalty will be waived, and the taxes owing and arrears interest must be paid unless otherwise waived. The interest will be waived only under three situations: extraordinary circumstances, actions of the CRA (processing delays or errors in published material), or inability to pay or financial hardship.

=== France ===
In 1986, the government of Jacques Chirac decided of a tax amnesty for companies and individuals who had hidden profits or revenue in tax heavens. The companies and individuals who took their money back to France had to pay a flat 10% rate. More than 16 billion francs came back to France in 1986.

=== Germany ===
In 2004, Germany granted a tax amnesty in connection with tax evasion.

=== Greece ===
On 30 September 2010, the Hellenic Parliament ratified a legislation pushed through by the Greek government in an effort to raise revenue, granting tax amnesty to millions of Greek citizens by paying just 55 percent of the outstanding debts. In 2011, the European Commission requested Greece to modify its tax legislation as its tax amnesty was considered discriminatory and incompatible with European Union treaties.

=== India ===
Government of India allowed the people to declare their undisclosed incomes in Income Declaration Scheme, 2016 and pay a total of 45% tax for one time settlement. About 64,275 disclosures were made amounting to ₹652.5 billion (US$9.4 billion). The scheme was in follow up to the demonetization when the country's Prime minister Narendra Modi scrapped 500 and 1000 rupee bank notes in a bid to flush out cash earned through illegal activities, or earned legally but never disclosed.

=== Indonesia ===
After several tax amnesties program launched in 1964, 1984 and 2008, Indonesia has applied another tax amnesty in 2016. After 3 consecutive 3 months periods in 2016 and 2017, ended on 31 March 2017, repatriation commitment was Rp 146.6 trillion but the realization was Rp 128.3 trillion or about $9.61 billion. While asset declaration was Rp 4,855 trillion from 956 thousands tax payers. The result is very successful. It is a new world record that tumbles 2009 Italy tax amnesty program with Rp 1,179 trillion and repatriated Rp 59 trillion.

=== Italy ===
Italy introduced a tax amnesty in 2001 that came to be known as Scudo Fiscale (English: Tax Shield), which was extended in 2003.

In 2009 the Italian tax amnesty subjected repatriated assets to a flat tax of 5%. In total around €80 billion in assets were declared, which resulted in tax revenues of €4 Billion. The Bank of Italy estimated that Italian citizens held around €500bn in undeclared funds outside the country.

=== Malaysia ===
It was introduced during Budget 2019 announcement on 2 November 2018. Starting in June 2023 year until the end of 2024, the government has suggested implementing another round of a program called Special Voluntary Disclosure Programme. This would provide a complete waiver of penalties and would be voluntary for individuals to participate in. Jagdev Singh, Pwc Tax leader of Malaysia stated that these additions to the 2019 programme would contribute positively to government revenues as the previous amnesty for direct taxes brought in additional taxes and penalties of close to RM8 billion.

=== Norway ===
Norway implemented a tax amnesty program during 2008–2016 for taxpayers who had undisclosed assets hidden abroad. The taxpayers who disclosed their assets did not face penalties or criminal sanctions. A 2022 study found that this led approximately 1,500 individuals to disclose their assets. Taxes paid by these individuals subsequently increased by 30%.

=== Pakistan ===
Pakistan introduced tax amnesty scheme in 2018 which yield $1 billion or Rs 121 billion tax revenues from individuals, Association of Persons & Corporations who declare their assets in this scheme.

=== Philippines ===
The Philippines introduced The Tax Amnesty Act of 2019 or the Republic Act No. 11213 which was signed into law on 14 February 2019, with a Veto Message of President Rodrigo R. Duterte. The said law was published on the Official Gazette on 18 February 2019, and took effect on 5 March 2019, that is, on the 15th day after the official publication. As a result, the Bureau of Internal Revenue which is the main collecting agency of the government, published the implementing rules and regulations on the availment of the tax amnesty, two of which are the Revenue Regulation No. 4-2019 : Amnesty on Tax Delinquencies which was issued on 5 April 2019, and Revenue Regulation No. 6-2019 : Estate Tax Amnesty which was issued on 29 May 2019.

=== Portugal ===
Portugal introduced tax amnesties in 2005 and 2010. The "Regressar" program was introduced in Portugal in 2019 with the aim of enticing Portuguese expatriates who departed the country before 2015 to come back and contribute to the country's growth. The program includes a tax amnesty initiative that allows individuals with unpaid tax obligations to settle their dues with reduced penalties and interest rates. In order to qualify for the program, individuals must meet specific criteria such as maintaining their tax residency in Portugal for at least three years. This program has been extended until the end of 2023 and has been deemed successful by the government, with many individuals taking advantage of the opportunity to normalize their tax status and invest in the country.

=== Russia ===
In 2007, a Russian tax amnesty program collected $130 million in the first six months. The Russian program was not open to anyone previously convicted of tax crimes such as tax evasion.

=== South Africa ===
In 2003, South Africa enacted the Exchange Control Amnesty And Amendment of Taxation Laws Act, a tax amnesty. Several tax amnesty initiatives have been implemented in South Africa in the past. The most recent program was called the "Special Voluntary Disclosure Program", which was introduced in 2017 and concluded in August of the same year. SARS regarded the program successful, with more than 2,000 taxpayers utilizing the program to disclose their previously undisclosed offshore assets and income. However, taxpayers who have failed to disclose their offshore assets and income since the program's termination risk substantial penalties and the possibility of criminal prosecution if detected by SARS.

=== Spain ===
In 2012, the Spanish Minister of Economy and Competitiveness Cristóbal Montoro announced a tax evasion amnesty for undeclared assets or those hidden in tax havens. Repatriation would be allowed by paying a 10 percent tax, with no criminal penalty.

=== United States ===
Many U.S. states have had tax amnesties. The City of Los Angeles collected $18.6 million in its 2009 tax amnesty program, claiming that the amount was $8.6 million more than was expected and that businesses saved $6.7 million in penalties. The state of Louisiana brought in $450 million from its 2009 tax amnesty program, three times more than what was expected, according to Republican Governor Bobby Jindal.

The IRS Criminal Investigation Division has had a longstanding practice of granting tax amnesty to taxpayers who have committed tax crimes, usually tax evasion. Following World War II, it was the administrative policy of the Internal Revenue Service to provide amnesty from criminal prosecution to taxpayers who voluntarily disclosed their underpayment of taxes. Although protected from criminal prosecution, such taxpayers still were subject to any civil penalties or interest that applied with respect to the delinquent taxes.

In a 2007 United States Senate bill that did not become law, a tax amnesty for illegal immigrants was proposed. The tax amnesty was supported by then-president George W. Bush and his Homeland Security Secretary Michael Chertoff.

The Streamlined Foreign Offshore Procedures, established by the IRS in 2012, offers U.S. taxpayers residing abroad a compliance pathway to rectify past non-willful omissions of foreign income and assets without facing certain penalties. To be eligible, taxpayers must meet specific non-residency criteria and submit comprehensive documentation, including a certification of non-willful conduct.

On 26 June 2012, IRS Commissioner Doug Shulman said the IRS offshore voluntary disclosure programs has so far collected more than $5 billion in back taxes, interest and penalties from 33,000 voluntary disclosures made under the first two programs.
