= International Journal of Historical Archaeology =

Academic journal

- Discipline: Historical archaeology
- Language: English
- Edited by: Charles E. Orser Jr.

Publication details
- History: 1997-present
- Publisher: Springer Science+Business Media
- Frequency: Quarterly

Standard abbreviations
- ISO 4: Int. J. Hist. Archaeol.

Indexing
- CODEN: IJHAFN
- ISSN: 1092-7697 (print); 1573-7748 (web)
- LCCN: 97652890
- OCLC no.: 44169294

Links
- Journal homepage; Online access

The International Journal of Historical Archaeology is an academic journal devoted to the archaeology of historical sites.
