= Historical archaeology =

Historical archaeology is a form of archaeology dealing with places, things, and issues from the past or present when written records and oral traditions can inform and contextualize cultural material. These records can both complement and conflict with the archaeological evidence found at a particular site. Studies focus on literate, historical- period societies as opposed to non-literate, prehistoric societies. While they may not have generated the records, the lives of people for whom there was little need for written records, such as the working class, slaves, indentured labourers, and children but who live in the historical period can also be the subject of study. The sites are found on land and underwater. Industrial archaeology, unless practiced at industrial sites from the prehistoric era, is a form of historical archaeology concentrating on the remains and products of industry and the Industrial era.

== Definition ==
According to the overall definition given here based on methodological and theoretical aspects classical archaeology or Egyptology as well as medieval archaeology are disciplines of historical archaeology. In practice, however – mainly in the Americas – historical archaeology refers to the modern, post-1492 period, which in Europe is often referred to as post-medieval archaeology. Historical archeology is also a growing field in Africa, with a focus on the trans-Atlantic slave trade.

== Notable historical archaeologists ==
- Mary Beaudry
- Judy Birmingham
- John L. Cotter
- James Deetz
- J. C. Harrington
- Ivor Noël Hume
- Mark P. Leone
- Theresa A. Singleton
- Stanley South
